= Kazimieras Černis =

Lithuanian astronomer and astrophysicist

Minor planets discovered: 118
see § List of discovered minor planets

Kazimieras Černis (born November 11, 1958, Vilnius) is a Lithuanian astronomer and astrophysicist, active member of the IAU, and a prolific discoverer of minor planets and comets. In 2012, he discovered 420356 Praamžius, a trans-Neptunian object and dwarf planet candidate.

Černis graduated from Vilnius University in 1981. From 1981 to 1990, he worked at the Lithuanian Academy of Sciences' Institute of Physics. Since 1996, Černis is a senior scientist at Vilnius University Institute of Theoretical Physics and Astronomy.

His research interests are photometry of stars, structure of the Milky Way, Solar System, comets, and asteroids. He is the leader of an asteroid search project at Molėtai Astronomical Observatory. Until 2006, Černis discovered 25 new comets (Černis comets) and 125 asteroids. As of 2016, the Minor Planet Center credits him with the discovery and co-discovery of 113 numbered minor planets he made during 2001–2012. He has published papers on photometry of stars and did research of interstellar extinction towards the direction of galactic anticenter.

== List of discovered minor planets ==
68730 Straizys	15 March 2002	list^{[A]}
73059 Kaunas	16 March 2002	list^{[A]}
95593 Azusienis	16 March 2002	list^{[A]}
95851 Stromvil	26 March 2003	list^{[B]}
124192 Moletai	26 July 2001	list^{[C]}
135561 Tautvaisiene	16 March 2002	list^{[A]}
140628 Klaipeda	20 October 2001	list^{[A]}
141496 Bartkevicius	15 March 2002	list^{[A]}
144752 Plunge	16 April 2004	list^{[A]}
151430 Nemunas	16 March 2002	list^{[A]}
154932 Sviderskiene	12 October 2004	list^{[A]}
155138 Pucinskas	9 October 2005	list^{[A]}
157396 Vansevicius	13 October 2004	list^{[A]}
157534 Siauliai	8 October 2005	list^{[A]}
166229 Palanga	17 March 2002	list
167960 Rudzikas	13 March 2005	list^{[A]}
169568 Baranauskas	16 March 2002	list^{[A]}
175548 Sudzius	27 September 2006	list^{[A]}
180141 Sperauskas	26 March 2003	list^{[A]}
184096 Kazlauskas	16 April 2004	list^{[A]}
(184786) 2005 TE_{53}	8 October 2005	list^{[A]}
185150 Panevezys	23 September 2006	list
187276 Meistas	8 October 2005	list^{[A]}
189396 Sielewicz	2 May 2008	list^{[A]}
191775 Poczobut	12 October 2004	list^{[A]}

(198125) 2004 TV_{17}	12 October 2004	list^{[A]}
198820 Iwanowska	13 March 2005	list^{[A]}
202092 Algirdas	11 October 2004	list
202093 Jogaila	11 October 2004	list^{[A]}
202704 Utena	14 April 2007	list^{[A]}
203823 Zdanavicius	5 October 2002	list
210147 Zalgiris	21 September 2006	list^{[A]}
212587 Bartasiute	23 September 2006	list^{[A]}
212606 Janulis	27 September 2006	list^{[A]}
212692 Lazauskaite	23 March 2007	list^{[A]}
212977 Birutė	2 February 2009	list
(224278) 2005 TH_{53}	8 October 2005	list^{[A]}
225033 Maskoliunas	23 March 2007	list^{[A]}
226672 Kucinskas	16 April 2004	list^{[A]}
(229198) 2004 TS_{357}	15 October 2004	list
(229427) 2005 TT_{52}	10 October 2005	list^{[A]}
231040 Kakaras	10 March 2005	list^{[A]}
233661 Alytus	31 August 2008	list^{[D]}
237845 Neris	16 March 2002	list^{[A]}
(241496) 2009 CZ_{3}	2 February 2009	list^{[A]}
242479 Marijampole	12 October 2004	list^{[A]}
245983 Machholz	26 September 2006	list
(247617) 2002 TP_{303}	5 October 2002	list
248839 Mazeikiai	25 September 2006	list
248993 Jonava	14 April 2007	list^{[A]}

252794 Maironis	16 March 2002	list^{[A]}
(257320) 2009 HE_{94}	26 April 2009	list^{[A]}
262284 Kanišauskas	26 September 2006	list^{[A]}
(261136) 2005 TK_{52}	8 October 2005	list^{[A]}
(263951) 2009 HJ_{94}	27 April 2009	list^{[A]}
(264068) 2009 SQ_{148}	19 September 2009	list^{[A]}
270903 Pakstiene	5 October 2002	list
274084 Baldone	3 January 2008	list^{[E]}
280686 Jasevičius	13 Maret 2005	list^{[A]}
(284013) 2004 TG_{242}	12 October 2004	list^{[A]}
(284863) 2009 CL_{2}	2 February 2009	list^{[A]}
(284942) 2010 EQ_{30}	10 March 2010	list^{[A]}
284984 Ikaunieks	12 April 2010	list^{[E]}
286693 Kodaitis	16 March 2002	list^{[A]}
288960 Steponasdarius	11 October 2004	list^{[A]}
288961 Stasysgirėnas	12 October 2004	list^{[A]}
289020 Ukmerge	12 October 2004	list
289021 Juzeliunas	12 October 2004	list^{[A]}
289121 Druskininkai	12 October 2004	list^{[A]}
(290411) 2005 TJ_{53}	8 October 2005	list^{[A]}
294664 Trakai	3 January 2008	list^{[E]}
(296207) 2009 CO_{2}	2 February 2009	list^{[A]}
(296472) 2009 HA_{94}	28 April 2009	list^{[A]}
(296967) 2010 EK_{74}	10 March 2010	list^{[A]}
296968 Ignatianum	12 March 2010	list^{[A]}

299897 Skipitis	23 September 2006	list
302849 Richardboyle	27 March 2003	list^{[A]}
(303304) 2004 TW_{17}	11 October 2004	list^{[A]}
305181 Donelaitis	5 November 2007	list
(308046) 2004 TX_{17}	12 October 2004	list^{[A]}
309206 Mažvydas	14 September 2007	list^{[A]}
(311177) 2004 TL_{347}	11 October 2004	list^{[A]}
(318277) 2004 TP_{16}	11 October 2004	list^{[A]}
319601 Šilute	25 September 2006	list^{[A]}
319636 Dziewulski	23 September 2006	list^{[A]}
320153 Eglitis	23 March 2007	list
321045 Kretinga	31 August 2008	list^{[D]}
321324 Vytautas	25 April 2009	list^{[E]}
324417 Kaišiadorys	27 September 2006	list^{[A]}
324787 Wlodarczyk	15 April 2007	list
325588 Bridzius	19 September 2009	list^{[A]}
330836 Orius	25 April 2009	list^{[E]}
332530 Canders	29 July 2008	list^{[E]}
(333720) 2009 SR_{148}	19 September 2009	list^{[A]}
335668 Ignalina	24 September 2006	list^{[A]}
(336860) 2011 FN_{129}	31 August 2008	list
338274 Valancius	5 October 2002	list
339855 Kedainiai	7 October 2002	list^{[A]}
(341087) 2007 HN_{97}	17 April 2007	list^{[A]}
343157 Mindaugas	25 April 2009	list^{[E]}

346318 Elektrenai	31 August 2008	list^{[D]}
(346805) 2009 CH_{2}	2 February 2009	list^{[A]}
(346896) 2009 SL_{98}	17 September 2009	list^{[A]}
348511 Žemaitė	10 October 2005	list^{[A]}
352646 Blumbahs	25 July 2008	list^{[E]}
(353194) 2009 SM_{100}	17 September 2009	list^{[A]}
353404 Laugalys	25 September 2006	list^{[A]}
353577 Gediminas	5 January 2008	list^{[E]}
(359169) 2009 CX_{3}	2 February 2009	list^{[A]}
(361265) 2006 SS_{372}	23 September 2006	list^{[A]}
361524 Klimka	24 March 2007	list^{[A]}
363706 Karazija	14 October 2004	list^{[A]}
(367534) 2009 RM_{7}	10 September 2009	list^{[A]}
(375759) 2009 SU_{100}	20 September 2009	list^{[A]}
(375801) 2009 TC_{14}	20 September 2009	list^{[A]}
386056 Taurage	24 March 2007	list
(389472) 2010 EL_{66}	10 March 2010	list^{[A]}
(390877) 2004 TH_{242}	13 October 2004	list^{[A]}
391042 Dubietis	8 October 2005	list
392142 Solheim	16 April 2009	list^{[E]}
(392440) 2010 RH_{120}	8 September 2010	list^{[A]}
(395019) 2009 CR_{3}	2 February 2009	list^{[A]}
(396854) 2004 SR_{9}	18 September 2004	list^{[A]}
(397013) 2005 TG_{53}	8 October 2005	list^{[A]}
(398010) 2009 CS_{13}	2 February 2009	list^{[A]}

(398067) 2009 HK_{81}	28 April 2009	list^{[A]}
(398152) 2010 EP_{74}	11 March 2010	list^{[A]}
400072 Radviliškis	25 September 2006	list^{[A]}
(400736) 2009 SX_{358}	19 September 2009	list^{[A]}
(403409) 2009 SO_{17}	17 September 2009	list^{[A]}
(411159) 2010 BN_{5}	24 January 2010	list^{[A]}
418220 Kestutis	3 February 2008	list^{[E]}
420356 Praamžius	23 January 2012	list^{[F]}
(425469) 2010 EX_{106}	11 March 2010	list^{[A]}
428694 Saule	29 July 2008	list^{[E]}
(435938) 2009 CP_{3}	2 February 2009	list^{[A]}
(441752) 2009 CG_{2}	2 February 2009	list^{[A]}
444562 Visaginas	25 September 2006	list^{[A]}
(445190) 2009 CW_{3}	2 February 2009	list^{[A]}
453256 Gucevičius	23 September 2008	list^{[A]}
457303 Daina	23 September 2008	list^{[A]}
457743 Balklavs	18 April 2009	list^{[E]}
463368 Eurytus	14 November 2012	list^{[F]}
483615 Martinmccarthy	18 September 2004	list^{[A]}
483636 Treanor	11 October 2004	list^{[A]}
483637 Johanstein	12 October 2004	list^{[A]}
(541592) 2011 UP_{15}	13 March 2005	list^{[A]}
(542754) 2013 HK_{51}	8 October 2005	list^{[A]}
(542800) 2013 JJ_{37}	12 October 2004	list^{[A]}
(543140) 2013 TP_{17}	9 March 2011	list

(543744) 2014 OT_{404}	26 September 2006	list^{[A]}
545564 Sabonis	23 August 2011	list^{[E]}
(545611) 2011 SG_{28}	25 September 2006	list
545619 Lapuska	3 September 2011	list^{[E]}
(546098) 2010 TF_{65}	8 October 2010	list
(549256) 2011 FR_{51}	9 March 2011	list
(551677) 2013 HP_{7}	23 January 2010	list^{[A]}
551878 Stoeger	29 February 2012	list^{[F]}
(552556) 2010 EK_{66}	10 March 2010	list^{[A]}
(553258) 2011 FU_{79}	9 March 2011	list
(554213) 2012 RT_{32}	10 March 2010	list^{[A]}
555128 Birštonas	12 September 2013	list^{[E]}
560794 Ugoboncompagni	23 November 2012	list^{[F]}
562971 Johannhagen	23 February 2012	list^{[F]}
565184 Janusz	22 February 2012	list^{[F]}
(566732) 2018 UX_{10}	26 September 2011	list^{[A]}
567580 Latuni	23 October 2017	list^{[E]}
(569547) 2005 UP_{351}	10 October 2005	list^{[A]}
(572307) 2008 FK_{86}	8 October 2005	list^{[A]}
(572531) 2008 QH_{35}	31 August 2008	list^{[A]}
(572614) 2008 SZ_{7}	31 August 2008	list^{[A]}
(573333) 2009 CP_{2}	2 February 2009	list^{[A]}
(575283) 2011 QD_{60}	26 September 2006	list^{[A]}
(577606) 2013 HB_{59}	12 October 2004	list^{[A]}
(579045) 2014 KP_{66}	12 October 2004	list^{[A]}

(580439) 2015 BT_{442}	13 October 2004	list^{[A]}
582928 Smriglio	23 February 2012	list^{[F]}
(587894) 2006 YC_{64}	26 September 2006	list^{[A]}
(589509) 2010 CV_{31}	12 October 2004	list^{[A]}
(589558) 2010 EN_{35}	10 March 2010	list^{[A]}
(591274) 2013 GP_{36}	23 March 2007	list^{[A]}
592244 Daukantas	6 May 2013	list^{[E]}
598895 Artjuhs	16 April 2009	list^{[E]}
(602949) 2014 TO_{38}	13 October 2004	list^{[A]}
604750 Marisabele	6 October 2015	list^{[E]}
604827 Rietavas	11 October 2015	list^{[E]}
(609519) 2005 EC_{335}	13 March 2005	list^{[A]}
611494 Gionti	18 May 2014	list^{[F]}
612946 Žirmūnai	10 March 2005	list
(618006) 2006 SB_{369}	26 September 2006	list^{[A]}
620307 Casanovas	22 February 2012	list^{[F]}
623031 Cartaya	28 March 2015	list^{[F]}
627981 Ponzoni	8 December 2012	list^{[F]}
(630934) 2006 SH_{281}	26 September 2006	list^{[A]}
633225 Daukša	18 April 2009	list^{[E]}
(633356) 2009 SQ_{17}	17 September 2009	list^{[B]}
(634213) 2011 FO_{3}	9 March 2011	list
634659 Colombo	23 February 2012	list^{[F]}
(635361) 2013 HX_{46}	1 October 2010	list
635478 Fotonikalv	4 September 2013	list^{[E]}

(637353) 2015 FN_{165}	2 September 2008	list
(638489) 2016 AW_{186}	5 October 2010	list
(638785) 2016 EA_{87}	10 March 2005	list^{[A]}
(647092) 2008 QG_{35}	31 August 2008	list^{[A]}
(648266) 2009 SL_{100}	17 September 2009	list^{[B]}
(648291) 2009 SS_{162}	12 October 2004	list^{[A]}
(649185) 2010 YZ_{4}	14 October 2004	list^{[A]}
(656108) 2015 VF_{133}	11 October 2004	list^{[A]}
658642 Carreira	29 September 2017	list^{[E]}
658787 Alksnis	19 October 2017	list^{[E]}
658882 Žemaitija	23 October 2017	list^{[E]}
(661548) 2004 TN_{347}	12 October 2004	list^{[A]}
(663160) 2007 BF_{76}	9 March 2011	list
(664536) 2008 SD_{8}	23 September 2008	list
(665613) 2009 SW_{77}	17 September 2009	list^{[B]}
(668173) 2011 UZ_{401}	26 October 2011	list^{[A]}
(673269) 2015 BY_{276}	13 March 2005	list^{[A]}
(674725) 2015 RR_{217}	24 January 2010	list^{[A]}
(675776) 2016 AV_{115}	10 March 2005	list^{[A]}
(678676) 2017 UK_{101}	23 October 2017	list^{[E]}
(678800) 2017 WW_{49}	17 November 2017	list^{[E]}
(685017) 2009 CQ_{3}	2 February 2009	list^{[A]}
(685795) 2009 YX_{6}	14 October 2004	list^{[A]}
688696 Bertiau	13 November 2012	list^{[F]}
(702794) 2006 SA_{435}	26 September 2006	list^{[A]}

(705563) 2009 DF_{88}	2 February 2009	list^{[A]}
709193 Concettafinardi	13 November 2012	list^{[F]}
714305 Panceri	27 September 2011	list^{[F]}
(714882) 2015 RG_{114}	13 March 2005	list^{[A]}
(722120) 2005 EJ_{293}	10 March 2005	list^{[A]}
(724932) 2008 SE_{8}	31 August 2008	list^{[A]}
(725678) 2009 CN_{3}	2 February 2009	list^{[A]}
(726057) 2009 ST_{77}	17 September 2009	list^{[B]}
(727518) 2010 HK_{51}	12 October 2004	list^{[A]}
(729376) 2011 EQ_{74}	9 March 2011	list
(733022) 2014 OU_{213}	5 October 2010	list
733173 Mārīteeglīte	6 August 2008	list^{[E]}
(735575) 2015 HF_{180}	10 March 2005	list^{[A]}
(736643) 2015 UC_{76}	26 September 2006	list^{[A]}
(738133) 2016 GR_{204}	10 March 2005	list^{[A]}
(744108) 2009 CB_{9}	10 March 2005	list^{[A]}
(744170) 2009 DX_{96}	3 February 2009	list^{[A]}
(744459) 2009 SK_{17}	17 September 2009	list^{[B]}
(744474) 2009 SV_{77}	17 September 2009	list^{[B]}
(745171) 2010 TH_{187}	1 October 2010	list
752403 Bayurisanto	20 November 2012	list^{[F]}
(754274) 2016 NT_{46}	17 September 2009	list^{[B]}
(758919) 2007 HH_{105}	17 April 2007	list^{[A]}
(761081) 2009 HD_{115}	26 April 2009	list^{[E]}
763533 Alabiano	21 February 2012	list^{[F]}

(765015) 2013 RO_{26}	4 September 2013	list^{[E]}
(775338) 2006 ST_{219}	23 September 2006	list^{[A]}
(775405) 2006 SE_{438}	25 September 2006	list^{[A]}
776675 Jędrzejewicz	19 October 2017	list^{[E]}
(779964) 2012 DR_{101}	31 August 2008	list^{[A]}
(780137) 2012 HK_{91}	16 April 2012	list^{[F]}
780857 Rodés	8 December 2012	list^{[F]}
(790358) 2018 RG_{17}	10 September 2018	list^{[E]}
798737 Faustina	13 November 2012	list^{[F]}
798772 Ledochowska	20 November 2012	list^{[F]}
(805212) 2016 CA_{389}	29 February 2012	list^{[F]}
808162 Andrejsērglis	23 October 2017	list^{[E]}
(811110) 2021 RR_{130}	21 March 2015	list^{[F]}
(811540) 2023 WA_{29}	18 November 2014	list^{[F]}
(815811) 2010 TX_{57}	5 October 2010	list
(818493) 2013 SB_{29}	31 August 2008	list^{[A]}
(824655) 2017 DG_{71}	24 November 2012	list^{[F]}
(828577) 2004 TO_{347}	12 October 2004	list^{[A]}
833362 Nida	5 May 2010	list^{[E]}
(836112) 2012 DK_{85}	25 February 2012	list^{[F]}
836275 Pietromaffi	25 April 2012	list^{[F]}
836955 Lais	24 November 2012	list^{[F]}
(843002) 2016 BA_{13}	15 October 2004	list^{[A]}
(845241) 2017 SQ_{228}	26 September 2017	list^{[E]}
(846464) 2019 RS_{14}	5 October 2015	list^{[E]}

(850058) 2006 SW_{406}	23 September 2006	list^{[A]}
(856173) 2011 SF_{81}	3 September 2011	list^{[E]}
858334 Gioacchinopecci	14 November 2012	list^{[F]}
(859641) 2013 QW_{47}	29 August 2013	list^{[E]}
(864404) 2014 YB_{43}	27 December 2014	list^{[F]}
(864938) 2015 DK_{16}	17 January 2015	list^{[F]}
(864997) 2015 DT_{147}	18 November 2014	list^{[F]}
(867151) 2015 VS_{109}	12 October 2015	list^{[E]}
(871390) 2017 RG_{3}	1 September 2006	list^{[B]}
Co-discovery made with:^{A} J. Zdanavičius^{B} K. Zdanavičius^{C} V. Laugalys^{D} E. Černis^{E} I. Eglītis^{F} R. P. Boyle

== See also ==
- List of minor planet discoverers § K. Cernis
