= List of minor planets: 833001–834000 =

The following is a partial list of minor planets, running from minor-planet number 833001 through 834000, inclusive. The primary data for this and other partial lists is based on JPL's "Small-Body Orbital Elements" and data available from the Minor Planet Center. Critical list information is also provided by the MPC, unless otherwise specified from Lowell Observatory. A detailed description of the table's columns and additional sources are given on the main page including a complete list of every page in this series, and a statistical break-up on the dynamical classification of minor planets.

Also see the summary list of all named bodies in numerical and alphabetical order, and the corresponding naming citations for the number range of this particular list. New namings may only be added to this list after official publication, as the preannouncement of names is condemned by the Working Group for Small Bodies Nomenclature of the International Astronomical Union.

Near-Earth obj.	MBA (inner)	MBA (outer)	Centaur
Mars-crosser	MBA (middle)	Jupiter trojan	Trans-Neptunian obj.
Unclassified

== 833001–833100 ==
Designation			Discovery			Properties		Ref
Permanent	Provisional	Named after	Date	Site	Discoverer(s)	Category	Diam.	Ref
833001	2010 GV_{68}	—	April 11, 2010	WISE	WISE	·	1.2 km	MPC · JPL
833002	2010 GY_{68}	—	March 29, 2009	Catalina	CSS	T_{j} (2.94)	2.9 km	MPC · JPL
833003	2010 GD_{69}	—	April 11, 2010	WISE	WISE	·	2.4 km	MPC · JPL
833004	2010 GF_{69}	—	April 11, 2010	WISE	WISE	·	2.6 km	MPC · JPL
833005	2010 GH_{69}	—	April 12, 2010	WISE	WISE	·	1.2 km	MPC · JPL
833006	2010 GR_{72}	—	April 25, 2004	Kitt Peak	Spacewatch	·	5.2 km	MPC · JPL
833007	2010 GU_{72}	—	April 13, 2010	WISE	WISE	·	950 m	MPC · JPL
833008	2010 GD_{75}	—	March 21, 2010	Catalina	CSS	·	980 m	MPC · JPL
833009	2010 GR_{75}	—	April 13, 2010	WISE	WISE	APO	280 m	MPC · JPL
833010	2010 GD_{76}	—	April 10, 2010	WISE	WISE	·	3.8 km	MPC · JPL
833011	2010 GR_{76}	—	April 10, 2010	WISE	WISE	·	960 m	MPC · JPL
833012	2010 GH_{77}	—	April 11, 2010	WISE	WISE	·	1.8 km	MPC · JPL
833013	2010 GL_{77}	—	April 11, 2010	WISE	WISE	·	1.6 km	MPC · JPL
833014	2010 GY_{77}	—	April 11, 2010	WISE	WISE	·	3.3 km	MPC · JPL
833015	2010 GR_{78}	—	February 9, 2005	Mount Lemmon	Mount Lemmon Survey	·	3.1 km	MPC · JPL
833016	2010 GV_{78}	—	April 11, 2010	WISE	WISE	·	2.5 km	MPC · JPL
833017	2010 GY_{78}	—	November 19, 2009	Mount Lemmon	Mount Lemmon Survey	EUP	2.3 km	MPC · JPL
833018	2010 GK_{79}	—	April 11, 2010	WISE	WISE	·	2.5 km	MPC · JPL
833019	2010 GN_{79}	—	April 11, 2010	WISE	WISE	·	2.1 km	MPC · JPL
833020	2010 GP_{79}	—	April 11, 2010	WISE	WISE	·	2.1 km	MPC · JPL
833021	2010 GV_{79}	—	January 13, 2010	Mount Lemmon	Mount Lemmon Survey	·	2.5 km	MPC · JPL
833022	2010 GX_{79}	—	January 8, 2010	Kitt Peak	Spacewatch	·	2.4 km	MPC · JPL
833023	2010 GC_{80}	—	April 11, 2010	WISE	WISE	·	4.0 km	MPC · JPL
833024	2010 GM_{81}	—	April 11, 2010	WISE	WISE	·	3.9 km	MPC · JPL
833025	2010 GZ_{82}	—	April 12, 2010	WISE	WISE	·	2.0 km	MPC · JPL
833026	2010 GA_{83}	—	April 12, 2010	WISE	WISE	·	3.5 km	MPC · JPL
833027	2010 GJ_{84}	—	April 12, 2010	WISE	WISE	·	2.2 km	MPC · JPL
833028	2010 GR_{84}	—	April 12, 2010	WISE	WISE	·	2.9 km	MPC · JPL
833029	2010 GD_{85}	—	April 12, 2010	WISE	WISE	·	2.3 km	MPC · JPL
833030	2010 GS_{85}	—	May 20, 2015	Cerro Tololo	DECam	·	2.7 km	MPC · JPL
833031	2010 GV_{85}	—	April 12, 2010	WISE	WISE	·	5.5 km	MPC · JPL
833032	2010 GN_{86}	—	October 7, 2005	Kitt Peak	Spacewatch	·	3.5 km	MPC · JPL
833033	2010 GH_{87}	—	May 9, 2006	Mount Lemmon	Mount Lemmon Survey	ARM	4.3 km	MPC · JPL
833034	2010 GO_{87}	—	December 15, 2009	Mount Lemmon	Mount Lemmon Survey	·	1.0 km	MPC · JPL
833035	2010 GU_{87}	—	April 12, 2010	WISE	WISE	·	1.5 km	MPC · JPL
833036	2010 GV_{87}	—	January 12, 2010	Catalina	CSS	·	2.9 km	MPC · JPL
833037	2010 GF_{88}	—	November 26, 2009	Mount Lemmon	Mount Lemmon Survey	·	3.6 km	MPC · JPL
833038	2010 GU_{89}	—	April 13, 2010	WISE	WISE	PHO	1.6 km	MPC · JPL
833039	2010 GA_{90}	—	April 13, 2010	WISE	WISE	LIX	2.7 km	MPC · JPL
833040	2010 GR_{90}	—	April 13, 2010	WISE	WISE	LUT	3.3 km	MPC · JPL
833041	2010 GF_{93}	—	April 14, 2010	WISE	WISE	·	2.3 km	MPC · JPL
833042	2010 GQ_{93}	—	April 14, 2010	WISE	WISE	·	2.9 km	MPC · JPL
833043	2010 GT_{93}	—	February 4, 2005	Mount Lemmon	Mount Lemmon Survey	·	2.3 km	MPC · JPL
833044	2010 GS_{94}	—	March 4, 2005	Catalina	CSS	·	2.8 km	MPC · JPL
833045	2010 GL_{95}	—	April 12, 2002	Palomar	NEAT	·	2.5 km	MPC · JPL
833046	2010 GH_{96}	—	April 14, 2010	WISE	WISE	·	3.2 km	MPC · JPL
833047	2010 GJ_{96}	—	April 14, 2010	WISE	WISE	·	1.6 km	MPC · JPL
833048	2010 GL_{96}	—	March 27, 2011	Kitt Peak	Spacewatch	·	2.8 km	MPC · JPL
833049	2010 GN_{96}	—	April 14, 2010	WISE	WISE	·	4.1 km	MPC · JPL
833050	2010 GP_{98}	—	March 12, 2010	Kitt Peak	Spacewatch	·	2.8 km	MPC · JPL
833051	2010 GT_{98}	—	March 12, 2010	Kitt Peak	Spacewatch	·	1.5 km	MPC · JPL
833052	2010 GK_{102}	—	March 12, 2010	Kitt Peak	Spacewatch	·	500 m	MPC · JPL
833053	2010 GY_{102}	—	March 26, 2010	Kitt Peak	Spacewatch	·	1.5 km	MPC · JPL
833054	2010 GW_{110}	—	March 11, 2003	Palomar	NEAT	PHO	640 m	MPC · JPL
833055	2010 GR_{115}	—	April 10, 2010	Kitt Peak	Spacewatch	LIX	3.1 km	MPC · JPL
833056	2010 GQ_{117}	—	April 10, 2010	Mount Lemmon	Mount Lemmon Survey	·	2.1 km	MPC · JPL
833057	2010 GU_{121}	—	April 12, 2010	Mount Lemmon	Mount Lemmon Survey	H	300 m	MPC · JPL
833058	2010 GB_{125}	—	April 7, 2010	Mount Lemmon	Mount Lemmon Survey	THB	3.0 km	MPC · JPL
833059	2010 GJ_{125}	—	February 1, 2006	Mount Lemmon	Mount Lemmon Survey	NYS	760 m	MPC · JPL
833060	2010 GO_{135}	—	March 18, 2010	Kitt Peak	Spacewatch	·	1.0 km	MPC · JPL
833061	2010 GE_{137}	—	April 5, 2010	Kitt Peak	Spacewatch	·	800 m	MPC · JPL
833062	2010 GX_{139}	—	April 7, 2010	Mount Lemmon	Mount Lemmon Survey	LIX	3.1 km	MPC · JPL
833063	2010 GH_{145}	—	November 21, 2009	Mount Lemmon	Mount Lemmon Survey	·	1.8 km	MPC · JPL
833064	2010 GF_{147}	—	April 15, 2010	Catalina	CSS	·	2.7 km	MPC · JPL
833065	2010 GO_{148}	—	April 14, 2010	WISE	WISE	·	2.0 km	MPC · JPL
833066	2010 GY_{149}	—	April 15, 2010	WISE	WISE	·	2.3 km	MPC · JPL
833067	2010 GC_{150}	—	April 15, 2010	WISE	WISE	·	2.1 km	MPC · JPL
833068	2010 GY_{151}	—	April 15, 2010	WISE	WISE	·	3.3 km	MPC · JPL
833069	2010 GD_{152}	—	April 15, 2010	WISE	WISE	·	3.6 km	MPC · JPL
833070	2010 GJ_{152}	—	January 1, 2014	Kitt Peak	Spacewatch	·	2.4 km	MPC · JPL
833071	2010 GU_{152}	—	April 15, 2010	WISE	WISE	·	3.3 km	MPC · JPL
833072	2010 GZ_{154}	—	January 8, 2010	Catalina	CSS	·	2.8 km	MPC · JPL
833073	2010 GB_{156}	—	April 15, 2010	WISE	WISE	LIX	3.3 km	MPC · JPL
833074	2010 GP_{156}	—	April 7, 2010	Mount Lemmon	Mount Lemmon Survey	PHO	2.2 km	MPC · JPL
833075	2010 GJ_{158}	—	March 19, 2010	Mount Lemmon	Mount Lemmon Survey	·	710 m	MPC · JPL
833076	2010 GV_{158}	—	May 15, 2005	Mount Lemmon	Mount Lemmon Survey	·	1.2 km	MPC · JPL
833077	2010 GC_{160}	—	April 14, 2010	WISE	WISE	L5	10 km	MPC · JPL
833078	2010 GO_{160}	—	April 11, 2010	WISE	WISE	L5	9.0 km	MPC · JPL
833079	2010 GW_{162}	—	April 11, 2010	WISE	WISE	·	2.9 km	MPC · JPL
833080	2010 GC_{163}	—	June 17, 2010	Mount Lemmon	Mount Lemmon Survey	·	1.6 km	MPC · JPL
833081	2010 GK_{163}	—	April 12, 2010	WISE	WISE	·	1.8 km	MPC · JPL
833082	2010 GT_{163}	—	January 12, 2010	Catalina	CSS	·	1.4 km	MPC · JPL
833083	2010 GY_{164}	—	April 14, 2010	WISE	WISE	·	4.5 km	MPC · JPL
833084	2010 GH_{165}	—	April 15, 2010	WISE	WISE	·	2.5 km	MPC · JPL
833085	2010 GL_{165}	—	June 21, 2010	Mount Lemmon	Mount Lemmon Survey	·	3.0 km	MPC · JPL
833086	2010 GM_{165}	—	April 15, 2010	WISE	WISE	·	860 m	MPC · JPL
833087	2010 GE_{166}	—	March 1, 2009	Mount Lemmon	Mount Lemmon Survey	·	3.0 km	MPC · JPL
833088	2010 GW_{166}	—	April 4, 2010	WISE	WISE	·	3.4 km	MPC · JPL
833089	2010 GZ_{166}	—	April 4, 2010	WISE	WISE	·	1.3 km	MPC · JPL
833090	2010 GC_{167}	—	April 4, 2010	WISE	WISE	·	2.2 km	MPC · JPL
833091	2010 GZ_{167}	—	April 5, 2010	WISE	WISE	·	2.4 km	MPC · JPL
833092	2010 GB_{168}	—	April 5, 2010	WISE	WISE	·	3.4 km	MPC · JPL
833093	2010 GW_{168}	—	May 25, 2006	Mount Lemmon	Mount Lemmon Survey	·	3.3 km	MPC · JPL
833094	2010 GB_{169}	—	January 12, 2010	Mount Lemmon	Mount Lemmon Survey	·	3.1 km	MPC · JPL
833095	2010 GH_{170}	—	April 8, 2010	WISE	WISE	·	3.5 km	MPC · JPL
833096	2010 GL_{170}	—	February 27, 2006	Kitt Peak	Spacewatch	MIS	1.6 km	MPC · JPL
833097	2010 GX_{171}	—	February 16, 2010	Kitt Peak	Spacewatch	·	1.1 km	MPC · JPL
833098	2010 GB_{176}	—	April 11, 2010	Mount Lemmon	Mount Lemmon Survey	·	1.6 km	MPC · JPL
833099	2010 GE_{200}	—	September 12, 2015	Haleakala	Pan-STARRS 1	·	520 m	MPC · JPL
833100	2010 GP_{200}	—	April 9, 2010	Catalina	CSS	·	1.1 km	MPC · JPL

== 833101–833200 ==
back to top

Designation			Discovery			Properties		Ref
Permanent	Provisional	Named after	Date	Site	Discoverer(s)	Category	Diam.	Ref
833101	2010 GD_{201}	—	April 10, 2010	Mount Lemmon	Mount Lemmon Survey	·	1.1 km	MPC · JPL
833102	2010 GZ_{201}	—	April 7, 2010	Kitt Peak	Spacewatch	EUP	2.8 km	MPC · JPL
833103	2010 GY_{203}	—	April 10, 2010	Mount Lemmon	Mount Lemmon Survey	·	510 m	MPC · JPL
833104	2010 GC_{204}	—	March 15, 2010	Mount Lemmon	Mount Lemmon Survey	·	1.2 km	MPC · JPL
833105	2010 GR_{205}	—	April 14, 2010	Kitt Peak	Spacewatch	3:2 · (6124)	3.9 km	MPC · JPL
833106	2010 GL_{206}	—	April 5, 2010	Mount Lemmon	Mount Lemmon Survey	·	1.3 km	MPC · JPL
833107	2010 GU_{206}	—	April 11, 2010	Mount Lemmon	Mount Lemmon Survey	·	1.9 km	MPC · JPL
833108	2010 GC_{207}	—	April 10, 2010	Kitt Peak	Spacewatch	·	1.5 km	MPC · JPL
833109	2010 GZ_{207}	—	April 9, 2010	Mount Lemmon	Mount Lemmon Survey	3:2 · SHU	4.2 km	MPC · JPL
833110	2010 GS_{209}	—	April 7, 2010	Kitt Peak	Spacewatch	·	1.9 km	MPC · JPL
833111	2010 GP_{213}	—	April 14, 2010	Kitt Peak	Spacewatch	H	370 m	MPC · JPL
833112	2010 HT	—	April 17, 2010	WISE	WISE	L5	10 km	MPC · JPL
833113	2010 HB_{1}	—	April 18, 2010	WISE	WISE	·	4.6 km	MPC · JPL
833114	2010 HT_{1}	—	April 16, 2010	WISE	WISE	·	3.4 km	MPC · JPL
833115	2010 HC_{2}	—	April 16, 2010	WISE	WISE	·	2.8 km	MPC · JPL
833116	2010 HE_{2}	—	April 16, 2010	WISE	WISE	·	2.4 km	MPC · JPL
833117	2010 HG_{2}	—	April 16, 2010	WISE	WISE	·	1.4 km	MPC · JPL
833118	2010 HK_{2}	—	April 16, 2010	WISE	WISE	·	1.6 km	MPC · JPL
833119	2010 HO_{2}	—	April 16, 2010	WISE	WISE	·	2.4 km	MPC · JPL
833120	2010 HC_{4}	—	April 16, 2010	WISE	WISE	·	4.8 km	MPC · JPL
833121	2010 HM_{4}	—	April 16, 2010	WISE	WISE	·	2.7 km	MPC · JPL
833122	2010 HQ_{4}	—	April 16, 2010	WISE	WISE	·	2.0 km	MPC · JPL
833123	2010 HN_{5}	—	April 16, 2010	WISE	WISE	·	3.0 km	MPC · JPL
833124	2010 HT_{5}	—	April 16, 2010	WISE	WISE	·	2.1 km	MPC · JPL
833125	2010 HB_{6}	—	April 16, 2010	WISE	WISE	·	4.3 km	MPC · JPL
833126	2010 HG_{6}	—	July 31, 2005	Palomar	NEAT	·	2.0 km	MPC · JPL
833127	2010 HQ_{7}	—	April 16, 2010	WISE	WISE	THB	3.6 km	MPC · JPL
833128	2010 HY_{8}	—	April 17, 2010	WISE	WISE	·	5.6 km	MPC · JPL
833129	2010 HG_{9}	—	April 17, 2010	WISE	WISE	·	1.6 km	MPC · JPL
833130	2010 HF_{11}	—	April 17, 2010	WISE	WISE	·	890 m	MPC · JPL
833131	2010 HP_{11}	—	April 17, 2010	WISE	WISE	·	1.8 km	MPC · JPL
833132	2010 HU_{11}	—	April 17, 2010	WISE	WISE	·	1.7 km	MPC · JPL
833133	2010 HF_{12}	—	January 8, 2010	Kitt Peak	Spacewatch	·	3.0 km	MPC · JPL
833134	2010 HJ_{13}	—	April 18, 2010	WISE	WISE	·	2.0 km	MPC · JPL
833135	2010 HU_{13}	—	January 12, 2010	Catalina	CSS	·	2.4 km	MPC · JPL
833136	2010 HW_{14}	—	January 8, 2010	Kitt Peak	Spacewatch	·	2.4 km	MPC · JPL
833137	2010 HB_{15}	—	April 18, 2010	WISE	WISE	·	1.4 km	MPC · JPL
833138	2010 HR_{15}	—	February 27, 2006	Catalina	CSS	·	1.3 km	MPC · JPL
833139	2010 HT_{16}	—	April 18, 2010	WISE	WISE	·	4.4 km	MPC · JPL
833140	2010 HZ_{16}	—	January 11, 2010	Mount Lemmon	Mount Lemmon Survey	·	2.5 km	MPC · JPL
833141	2010 HF_{17}	—	April 18, 2010	WISE	WISE	KON	1.8 km	MPC · JPL
833142	2010 HT_{17}	—	October 8, 2008	Mount Lemmon	Mount Lemmon Survey	·	2.6 km	MPC · JPL
833143	2010 HV_{17}	—	November 27, 2009	Mount Lemmon	Mount Lemmon Survey	·	2.0 km	MPC · JPL
833144	2010 HA_{18}	—	October 2, 2008	Mount Lemmon	Mount Lemmon Survey	LIX	2.3 km	MPC · JPL
833145	2010 HQ_{18}	—	April 18, 2010	WISE	WISE	·	2.5 km	MPC · JPL
833146	2010 HL_{19}	—	April 18, 2010	WISE	WISE	·	1.2 km	MPC · JPL
833147	2010 HX_{19}	—	April 17, 2010	WISE	WISE	L5	7.9 km	MPC · JPL
833148	2010 HU_{20}	—	April 19, 2010	WISE	WISE	L5	11 km	MPC · JPL
833149	2010 HB_{22}	—	April 23, 2010	WISE	WISE	L5	7.7 km	MPC · JPL
833150	2010 HL_{22}	—	April 24, 2010	WISE	WISE	L5	5.8 km	MPC · JPL
833151	2010 HN_{22}	—	February 12, 2018	Haleakala	Pan-STARRS 1	·	1.6 km	MPC · JPL
833152	2010 HS_{22}	—	April 25, 2010	WISE	WISE	·	3.1 km	MPC · JPL
833153	2010 HY_{24}	—	April 18, 2010	WISE	WISE	·	3.6 km	MPC · JPL
833154	2010 HT_{25}	—	April 19, 2010	WISE	WISE	·	3.0 km	MPC · JPL
833155	2010 HC_{26}	—	December 20, 2009	Mount Lemmon	Mount Lemmon Survey	(194)	2.0 km	MPC · JPL
833156	2010 HA_{28}	—	February 14, 2010	Westfield	International Astronomical Search Collaboration	·	1.8 km	MPC · JPL
833157	2010 HD_{29}	—	April 19, 2010	WISE	WISE	TIN	1.4 km	MPC · JPL
833158	2010 HE_{29}	—	April 19, 2010	WISE	WISE	·	3.5 km	MPC · JPL
833159	2010 HO_{29}	—	May 16, 2007	Mount Lemmon	Mount Lemmon Survey	·	1.6 km	MPC · JPL
833160	2010 HU_{29}	—	April 19, 2010	WISE	WISE	T_{j} (2.95)	2.0 km	MPC · JPL
833161	2010 HV_{29}	—	April 19, 2010	WISE	WISE	·	1.4 km	MPC · JPL
833162	2010 HA_{30}	—	April 19, 2010	WISE	WISE	EUN	2.1 km	MPC · JPL
833163	2010 HD_{30}	—	April 19, 2010	WISE	WISE	·	1.6 km	MPC · JPL
833164	2010 HG_{30}	—	March 20, 1999	Sacramento Peak	SDSS	·	2.8 km	MPC · JPL
833165	2010 HL_{30}	—	January 21, 2010	La Sagra	OAM	·	1.9 km	MPC · JPL
833166	2010 HM_{30}	—	April 19, 2010	WISE	WISE	·	3.1 km	MPC · JPL
833167	2010 HR_{30}	—	April 19, 2010	WISE	WISE	·	1.8 km	MPC · JPL
833168	2010 HV_{30}	—	April 19, 2010	WISE	WISE	·	3.5 km	MPC · JPL
833169	2010 HG_{31}	—	April 19, 2010	WISE	WISE	·	1.8 km	MPC · JPL
833170	2010 HP_{31}	—	January 6, 2010	Kitt Peak	Spacewatch	·	4.0 km	MPC · JPL
833171	2010 HQ_{31}	—	April 19, 2010	WISE	WISE	·	2.2 km	MPC · JPL
833172	2010 HJ_{32}	—	January 11, 2010	Kitt Peak	Spacewatch	·	3.1 km	MPC · JPL
833173	2010 HV_{33}	—	April 20, 2010	WISE	WISE	·	1.2 km	MPC · JPL
833174	2010 HA_{34}	—	April 20, 2010	WISE	WISE	·	3.7 km	MPC · JPL
833175	2010 HR_{34}	—	April 20, 2010	WISE	WISE	·	1.8 km	MPC · JPL
833176	2010 HB_{35}	—	April 20, 2010	WISE	WISE	·	2.9 km	MPC · JPL
833177	2010 HD_{35}	—	April 20, 2010	WISE	WISE	·	3.5 km	MPC · JPL
833178	2010 HY_{35}	—	April 20, 2010	WISE	WISE	·	2.5 km	MPC · JPL
833179	2010 HN_{38}	—	March 2, 2009	Mount Lemmon	Mount Lemmon Survey	·	2.6 km	MPC · JPL
833180	2010 HY_{38}	—	September 2, 2005	Palomar	NEAT	EUP	3.2 km	MPC · JPL
833181	2010 HR_{39}	—	April 21, 2010	WISE	WISE	·	2.4 km	MPC · JPL
833182	2010 HW_{39}	—	April 21, 2010	WISE	WISE	·	2.2 km	MPC · JPL
833183	2010 HB_{40}	—	April 21, 2010	WISE	WISE	T_{j} (2.96)	3.6 km	MPC · JPL
833184	2010 HS_{40}	—	April 22, 2010	WISE	WISE	·	1.7 km	MPC · JPL
833185	2010 HJ_{41}	—	December 28, 2013	Kitt Peak	Spacewatch	·	2.4 km	MPC · JPL
833186	2010 HS_{41}	—	April 22, 2010	WISE	WISE	·	1.1 km	MPC · JPL
833187	2010 HD_{42}	—	April 22, 2010	WISE	WISE	URS	3.5 km	MPC · JPL
833188	2010 HQ_{42}	—	April 22, 2010	WISE	WISE	·	1.9 km	MPC · JPL
833189	2010 HX_{43}	—	February 9, 2010	Catalina	CSS	·	2.0 km	MPC · JPL
833190	2010 HQ_{46}	—	April 23, 2010	WISE	WISE	·	1.6 km	MPC · JPL
833191	2010 HT_{46}	—	April 23, 2010	WISE	WISE	·	4.1 km	MPC · JPL
833192	2010 HG_{47}	—	April 23, 2010	WISE	WISE	·	3.6 km	MPC · JPL
833193	2010 HP_{47}	—	April 23, 2010	WISE	WISE	·	4.7 km	MPC · JPL
833194	2010 HH_{50}	—	April 24, 2010	WISE	WISE	·	2.4 km	MPC · JPL
833195	2010 HU_{50}	—	October 29, 2003	Kitt Peak	Spacewatch	·	1.6 km	MPC · JPL
833196	2010 HH_{52}	—	April 24, 2010	WISE	WISE	·	2.6 km	MPC · JPL
833197	2010 HR_{52}	—	April 24, 2010	WISE	WISE	KON	1.6 km	MPC · JPL
833198	2010 HK_{53}	—	October 20, 2008	Mount Lemmon	Mount Lemmon Survey	·	2.3 km	MPC · JPL
833199	2010 HS_{53}	—	April 24, 2010	WISE	WISE	·	2.8 km	MPC · JPL
833200	2010 HW_{53}	—	April 24, 2010	WISE	WISE	·	1.9 km	MPC · JPL

== 833201–833300 ==
back to top

Designation			Discovery			Properties		Ref
Permanent	Provisional	Named after	Date	Site	Discoverer(s)	Category	Diam.	Ref
833201	2010 HH_{55}	—	April 25, 2010	WISE	WISE	·	3.1 km	MPC · JPL
833202	2010 HM_{55}	—	April 25, 2010	WISE	WISE	·	3.0 km	MPC · JPL
833203	2010 HP_{55}	—	January 6, 2010	Kitt Peak	Spacewatch	·	2.7 km	MPC · JPL
833204	2010 HS_{55}	—	April 25, 2010	WISE	WISE	·	2.4 km	MPC · JPL
833205	2010 HY_{55}	—	April 25, 2010	WISE	WISE	·	2.0 km	MPC · JPL
833206	2010 HZ_{55}	—	April 25, 2010	WISE	WISE	·	3.5 km	MPC · JPL
833207	2010 HG_{56}	—	April 19, 2006	Kitt Peak	Spacewatch	·	1.9 km	MPC · JPL
833208	2010 HA_{57}	—	September 1, 2005	Palomar	NEAT	·	2.8 km	MPC · JPL
833209	2010 HG_{57}	—	April 25, 2010	WISE	WISE	KON	1.9 km	MPC · JPL
833210	2010 HJ_{57}	—	April 25, 2010	WISE	WISE	·	3.0 km	MPC · JPL
833211	2010 HO_{57}	—	April 25, 2010	WISE	WISE	·	1.9 km	MPC · JPL
833212	2010 HU_{57}	—	April 25, 2010	WISE	WISE	DOR	2.1 km	MPC · JPL
833213	2010 HJ_{58}	—	April 25, 2010	WISE	WISE	·	3.5 km	MPC · JPL
833214	2010 HT_{59}	—	April 25, 2010	WISE	WISE	·	1.1 km	MPC · JPL
833215	2010 HK_{60}	—	April 25, 2010	WISE	WISE	·	2.2 km	MPC · JPL
833216	2010 HT_{60}	—	April 25, 2010	WISE	WISE	·	2.3 km	MPC · JPL
833217	2010 HR_{62}	—	April 26, 2010	WISE	WISE	·	3.7 km	MPC · JPL
833218	2010 HC_{63}	—	April 26, 2010	WISE	WISE	·	2.8 km	MPC · JPL
833219	2010 HM_{64}	—	March 11, 2005	Kitt Peak	Spacewatch	·	2.0 km	MPC · JPL
833220	2010 HR_{64}	—	November 24, 2006	Mount Lemmon	Mount Lemmon Survey	·	3.6 km	MPC · JPL
833221	2010 HN_{65}	—	February 15, 2010	Mount Lemmon	Mount Lemmon Survey	·	3.0 km	MPC · JPL
833222	2010 HR_{65}	—	February 21, 2001	Kitt Peak	Spacewatch	·	1.8 km	MPC · JPL
833223	2010 HO_{66}	—	January 11, 2010	Kitt Peak	Spacewatch	·	2.4 km	MPC · JPL
833224	2010 HA_{67}	—	April 26, 2010	WISE	WISE	·	1.6 km	MPC · JPL
833225	2010 HT_{67}	—	April 26, 2010	WISE	WISE	·	1.3 km	MPC · JPL
833226	2010 HB_{68}	—	February 20, 2006	Catalina	CSS	·	2.3 km	MPC · JPL
833227	2010 HJ_{68}	—	April 27, 2010	WISE	WISE	·	2.0 km	MPC · JPL
833228	2010 HB_{69}	—	April 27, 2010	WISE	WISE	·	2.5 km	MPC · JPL
833229	2010 HR_{69}	—	April 27, 2010	WISE	WISE	·	2.2 km	MPC · JPL
833230	2010 HL_{70}	—	April 27, 2010	WISE	WISE	·	1.5 km	MPC · JPL
833231	2010 HS_{70}	—	April 27, 2010	WISE	WISE	PHO	2.7 km	MPC · JPL
833232	2010 HB_{71}	—	January 6, 2010	Kitt Peak	Spacewatch	·	1.5 km	MPC · JPL
833233	2010 HF_{71}	—	September 13, 2005	Kitt Peak	Spacewatch	·	1.3 km	MPC · JPL
833234	2010 HK_{71}	—	April 27, 2010	WISE	WISE	·	2.2 km	MPC · JPL
833235	2010 HL_{71}	—	April 27, 2010	WISE	WISE	·	4.1 km	MPC · JPL
833236	2010 HX_{72}	—	April 27, 2010	WISE	WISE	·	2.8 km	MPC · JPL
833237	2010 HY_{72}	—	April 27, 2010	WISE	WISE	·	2.1 km	MPC · JPL
833238	2010 HC_{73}	—	April 27, 2010	WISE	WISE	·	1.9 km	MPC · JPL
833239	2010 HJ_{73}	—	October 27, 2009	Kitt Peak	Spacewatch	·	2.9 km	MPC · JPL
833240	2010 HK_{73}	—	April 27, 2010	WISE	WISE	·	2.2 km	MPC · JPL
833241	2010 HO_{73}	—	January 5, 2010	Kitt Peak	Spacewatch	ADE	2.5 km	MPC · JPL
833242	2010 HK_{74}	—	April 28, 2010	WISE	WISE	·	3.6 km	MPC · JPL
833243	2010 HU_{74}	—	February 13, 2010	Mount Lemmon	Mount Lemmon Survey	·	2.8 km	MPC · JPL
833244	2010 HY_{75}	—	April 28, 2010	WISE	WISE	·	3.2 km	MPC · JPL
833245	2010 HV_{80}	—	April 11, 2010	Kitt Peak	Spacewatch	·	1.5 km	MPC · JPL
833246	2010 HL_{82}	—	April 27, 2010	WISE	WISE	·	3.2 km	MPC · JPL
833247	2010 HO_{82}	—	April 28, 2010	WISE	WISE	·	1.2 km	MPC · JPL
833248	2010 HQ_{82}	—	April 28, 2010	WISE	WISE	·	2.6 km	MPC · JPL
833249	2010 HE_{83}	—	May 13, 2004	Kitt Peak	Spacewatch	·	2.8 km	MPC · JPL
833250	2010 HR_{84}	—	April 28, 2010	WISE	WISE	·	3.5 km	MPC · JPL
833251	2010 HD_{85}	—	April 28, 2010	WISE	WISE	·	1.9 km	MPC · JPL
833252	2010 HG_{85}	—	April 28, 2010	WISE	WISE	·	6.6 km	MPC · JPL
833253	2010 HS_{85}	—	April 28, 2010	WISE	WISE	PHO	560 m	MPC · JPL
833254	2010 HX_{85}	—	April 28, 2010	WISE	WISE	·	2.0 km	MPC · JPL
833255	2010 HD_{86}	—	April 28, 2010	WISE	WISE	·	1.7 km	MPC · JPL
833256	2010 HF_{86}	—	April 28, 2010	WISE	WISE	URS	2.9 km	MPC · JPL
833257	2010 HK_{86}	—	January 17, 2010	Kitt Peak	Spacewatch	ADE	1.9 km	MPC · JPL
833258	2010 HR_{86}	—	April 28, 2010	WISE	WISE	·	1.6 km	MPC · JPL
833259	2010 HZ_{86}	—	April 28, 2010	WISE	WISE	·	2.9 km	MPC · JPL
833260	2010 HP_{87}	—	February 16, 2010	Mount Lemmon	Mount Lemmon Survey	·	2.1 km	MPC · JPL
833261	2010 HX_{87}	—	April 29, 2010	WISE	WISE	·	2.7 km	MPC · JPL
833262	2010 HG_{88}	—	April 29, 2010	WISE	WISE	·	1.8 km	MPC · JPL
833263	2010 HB_{90}	—	September 29, 2011	Mount Lemmon	Mount Lemmon Survey	·	3.3 km	MPC · JPL
833264	2010 HR_{90}	—	April 29, 2010	WISE	WISE	·	1.8 km	MPC · JPL
833265	2010 HJ_{92}	—	April 29, 2010	WISE	WISE	·	1.8 km	MPC · JPL
833266	2010 HQ_{92}	—	April 29, 2010	WISE	WISE	LIX	3.8 km	MPC · JPL
833267	2010 HS_{93}	—	April 29, 2010	WISE	WISE	·	2.6 km	MPC · JPL
833268	2010 HS_{94}	—	April 29, 2010	WISE	WISE	LIX	2.8 km	MPC · JPL
833269	2010 HC_{95}	—	February 15, 2010	Mount Lemmon	Mount Lemmon Survey	·	3.8 km	MPC · JPL
833270	2010 HU_{95}	—	October 10, 2005	Catalina	CSS	LIX	3.9 km	MPC · JPL
833271	2010 HW_{95}	—	April 30, 2010	WISE	WISE	·	3.0 km	MPC · JPL
833272	2010 HA_{96}	—	April 30, 2010	WISE	WISE	·	3.0 km	MPC · JPL
833273	2010 HC_{96}	—	February 15, 2010	Mount Lemmon	Mount Lemmon Survey	·	2.1 km	MPC · JPL
833274	2010 HP_{96}	—	April 30, 2010	WISE	WISE	EUP	3.5 km	MPC · JPL
833275	2010 HQ_{96}	—	April 30, 2010	WISE	WISE	·	1.7 km	MPC · JPL
833276	2010 HZ_{96}	—	April 30, 2010	WISE	WISE	·	2.3 km	MPC · JPL
833277	2010 HC_{99}	—	March 31, 2016	Haleakala	Pan-STARRS 1	·	2.0 km	MPC · JPL
833278	2010 HS_{100}	—	May 23, 2014	Haleakala	Pan-STARRS 1	GEF	2.2 km	MPC · JPL
833279	2010 HN_{101}	—	April 30, 2010	WISE	WISE	·	2.6 km	MPC · JPL
833280	2010 HT_{102}	—	February 9, 2010	Mount Lemmon	Mount Lemmon Survey	·	2.4 km	MPC · JPL
833281	2010 HX_{102}	—	February 13, 2010	Catalina	CSS	·	3.3 km	MPC · JPL
833282	2010 HV_{107}	—	April 11, 2010	Kitt Peak	Spacewatch	·	1.9 km	MPC · JPL
833283	2010 HK_{109}	—	April 16, 2010	WISE	WISE	·	3.3 km	MPC · JPL
833284	2010 HL_{110}	—	January 12, 2010	Kitt Peak	Spacewatch	DOR	1.7 km	MPC · JPL
833285	2010 HJ_{111}	—	April 19, 2010	WISE	WISE	EUP	3.4 km	MPC · JPL
833286	2010 HL_{111}	—	April 19, 2010	WISE	WISE	·	2.5 km	MPC · JPL
833287	2010 HB_{112}	—	April 19, 2010	WISE	WISE	·	2.8 km	MPC · JPL
833288	2010 HW_{113}	—	March 12, 2010	Kitt Peak	Spacewatch	MIS	1.8 km	MPC · JPL
833289	2010 HT_{114}	—	April 20, 2010	Mount Lemmon	Mount Lemmon Survey	·	1.9 km	MPC · JPL
833290	2010 HG_{118}	—	November 18, 2017	Haleakala	Pan-STARRS 1	·	2.5 km	MPC · JPL
833291	2010 HS_{133}	—	December 3, 2014	Haleakala	Pan-STARRS 1	·	2.9 km	MPC · JPL
833292	2010 JX	—	May 1, 2010	WISE	WISE	L5	7.0 km	MPC · JPL
833293	2010 JO_{4}	—	May 1, 2010	WISE	WISE	ADE	2.2 km	MPC · JPL
833294	2010 JT_{4}	—	May 1, 2010	WISE	WISE	·	1.0 km	MPC · JPL
833295	2010 JD_{6}	—	May 1, 2010	WISE	WISE	·	2.2 km	MPC · JPL
833296	2010 JF_{8}	—	May 1, 2010	WISE	WISE	·	1.7 km	MPC · JPL
833297	2010 JD_{9}	—	May 1, 2010	WISE	WISE	·	1.6 km	MPC · JPL
833298	2010 JJ_{9}	—	May 1, 2010	WISE	WISE	T_{j} (2.99)	2.7 km	MPC · JPL
833299	2010 JK_{9}	—	May 1, 2010	WISE	WISE	·	2.4 km	MPC · JPL
833300	2010 JW_{10}	—	May 2, 2010	WISE	WISE	·	2.3 km	MPC · JPL

== 833301–833400 ==
back to top

Designation			Discovery			Properties		Ref
Permanent	Provisional	Named after	Date	Site	Discoverer(s)	Category	Diam.	Ref
833301	2010 JM_{11}	—	January 12, 2010	Catalina	CSS	·	2.8 km	MPC · JPL
833302	2010 JS_{11}	—	May 2, 2010	WISE	WISE	·	2.4 km	MPC · JPL
833303	2010 JV_{11}	—	May 2, 2010	WISE	WISE	·	2.7 km	MPC · JPL
833304	2010 JF_{12}	—	October 8, 2008	Mount Lemmon	Mount Lemmon Survey	·	2.3 km	MPC · JPL
833305	2010 JV_{13}	—	February 20, 2010	Kitt Peak	Spacewatch	·	3.1 km	MPC · JPL
833306	2010 JG_{14}	—	February 9, 2010	Mount Lemmon	Mount Lemmon Survey	·	2.4 km	MPC · JPL
833307	2010 JQ_{15}	—	May 2, 2010	WISE	WISE	·	1.7 km	MPC · JPL
833308	2010 JR_{16}	—	May 2, 2010	WISE	WISE	·	2.6 km	MPC · JPL
833309	2010 JX_{16}	—	May 2, 2010	WISE	WISE	·	2.9 km	MPC · JPL
833310	2010 JG_{17}	—	May 3, 2010	WISE	WISE	·	3.5 km	MPC · JPL
833311	2010 JT_{17}	—	May 3, 2010	WISE	WISE	·	1.9 km	MPC · JPL
833312	2010 JH_{18}	—	November 8, 2008	Kitt Peak	Spacewatch	·	2.8 km	MPC · JPL
833313	2010 JN_{18}	—	February 9, 2005	Kitt Peak	Spacewatch	·	2.9 km	MPC · JPL
833314	2010 JT_{20}	—	May 3, 2010	WISE	WISE	·	3.8 km	MPC · JPL
833315	2010 JY_{20}	—	February 13, 2010	Mount Lemmon	Mount Lemmon Survey	·	3.2 km	MPC · JPL
833316	2010 JF_{21}	—	May 3, 2010	WISE	WISE	·	1.6 km	MPC · JPL
833317	2010 JM_{21}	—	May 3, 2010	WISE	WISE	·	2.4 km	MPC · JPL
833318	2010 JK_{22}	—	January 10, 2008	Mount Lemmon	Mount Lemmon Survey	EUP	4.0 km	MPC · JPL
833319	2010 JU_{22}	—	May 4, 2010	WISE	WISE	·	1.3 km	MPC · JPL
833320	2010 JS_{24}	—	January 24, 2010	Siding Spring	SSS	·	5.0 km	MPC · JPL
833321	2010 JN_{25}	—	January 15, 2010	Mount Lemmon	Mount Lemmon Survey	·	1.9 km	MPC · JPL
833322	2010 JS_{25}	—	May 4, 2010	WISE	WISE	·	1.8 km	MPC · JPL
833323	2010 JO_{26}	—	May 5, 2010	WISE	WISE	DOR	1.6 km	MPC · JPL
833324	2010 JR_{26}	—	May 5, 2010	WISE	WISE	·	2.7 km	MPC · JPL
833325	2010 JV_{27}	—	May 5, 2010	WISE	WISE	DOR	1.8 km	MPC · JPL
833326	2010 JW_{27}	—	May 5, 2010	WISE	WISE	·	1.1 km	MPC · JPL
833327	2010 JK_{28}	—	May 5, 2010	WISE	WISE	EUN	1.0 km	MPC · JPL
833328	2010 JU_{41}	—	May 6, 2010	WISE	WISE	·	2.9 km	MPC · JPL
833329	2010 JJ_{42}	—	May 7, 2010	WISE	WISE	L5	9.9 km	MPC · JPL
833330	2010 JT_{49}	—	May 5, 2010	WISE	WISE	·	2.2 km	MPC · JPL
833331	2010 JO_{50}	—	May 28, 2006	Nogales	J.-C. Merlin	·	4.3 km	MPC · JPL
833332	2010 JY_{50}	—	April 6, 2000	Kitt Peak	Spacewatch	·	2.4 km	MPC · JPL
833333	2010 JT_{52}	—	May 6, 2010	WISE	WISE	·	1.4 km	MPC · JPL
833334	2010 JX_{52}	—	April 24, 2006	Kitt Peak	Spacewatch	·	2.3 km	MPC · JPL
833335	2010 JJ_{53}	—	January 11, 2010	Kitt Peak	Spacewatch	·	3.8 km	MPC · JPL
833336	2010 JF_{54}	—	September 16, 2006	Catalina	CSS	·	1.9 km	MPC · JPL
833337	2010 JY_{55}	—	May 7, 2010	WISE	WISE	·	2.8 km	MPC · JPL
833338	2010 JY_{57}	—	May 7, 2010	WISE	WISE	·	1.8 km	MPC · JPL
833339	2010 JG_{59}	—	May 7, 2010	WISE	WISE	·	970 m	MPC · JPL
833340	2010 JJ_{59}	—	May 7, 2010	WISE	WISE	EUP	3.8 km	MPC · JPL
833341	2010 JS_{59}	—	May 8, 2010	WISE	WISE	LUT	3.5 km	MPC · JPL
833342	2010 JV_{61}	—	May 8, 2010	WISE	WISE	·	2.3 km	MPC · JPL
833343	2010 JE_{62}	—	May 8, 2010	WISE	WISE	·	3.1 km	MPC · JPL
833344	2010 JG_{62}	—	May 8, 2010	WISE	WISE	·	2.0 km	MPC · JPL
833345	2010 JN_{62}	—	May 8, 2010	WISE	WISE	·	2.5 km	MPC · JPL
833346	2010 JH_{63}	—	May 8, 2010	WISE	WISE	·	5.1 km	MPC · JPL
833347	2010 JL_{63}	—	October 25, 2008	Kitt Peak	Spacewatch	·	3.4 km	MPC · JPL
833348	2010 JS_{63}	—	August 18, 2006	Kitt Peak	Spacewatch	·	1.4 km	MPC · JPL
833349	2010 JF_{64}	—	May 8, 2010	WISE	WISE	·	1.3 km	MPC · JPL
833350	2010 JN_{64}	—	May 8, 2010	WISE	WISE	·	2.2 km	MPC · JPL
833351	2010 JY_{64}	—	May 8, 2010	WISE	WISE	·	2.6 km	MPC · JPL
833352	2010 JC_{65}	—	May 9, 2010	WISE	WISE	·	1.9 km	MPC · JPL
833353	2010 JG_{65}	—	May 9, 2010	WISE	WISE	·	3.1 km	MPC · JPL
833354	2010 JG_{66}	—	May 9, 2010	WISE	WISE	·	2.4 km	MPC · JPL
833355	2010 JC_{67}	—	May 9, 2010	WISE	WISE	·	2.2 km	MPC · JPL
833356	2010 JG_{68}	—	May 9, 2010	WISE	WISE	·	2.4 km	MPC · JPL
833357	2010 JY_{68}	—	May 9, 2010	WISE	WISE	·	1.7 km	MPC · JPL
833358	2010 JO_{69}	—	May 9, 2010	WISE	WISE	·	4.7 km	MPC · JPL
833359	2010 JM_{70}	—	May 9, 2010	WISE	WISE	·	2.2 km	MPC · JPL
833360	2010 JY_{73}	—	May 8, 2010	Mount Lemmon	Mount Lemmon Survey	·	3.1 km	MPC · JPL
833361	2010 JX_{75}	—	May 5, 2010	Mount Lemmon	Mount Lemmon Survey	·	1.5 km	MPC · JPL
833362 Nida	2010 JN_{76}	Nida	May 5, 2010	Baldone	K. Černis, I. Eglītis	TEL	3.0 km	MPC · JPL
833363	2010 JH_{83}	—	April 10, 2010	Mount Lemmon	Mount Lemmon Survey	·	2.3 km	MPC · JPL
833364	2010 JQ_{83}	—	May 7, 2010	Kitt Peak	Spacewatch	·	840 m	MPC · JPL
833365	2010 JX_{84}	—	November 18, 2008	Kitt Peak	Spacewatch	·	2.4 km	MPC · JPL
833366	2010 JL_{89}	—	May 9, 2010	WISE	WISE	·	3.0 km	MPC · JPL
833367	2010 JA_{90}	—	October 10, 2004	Kitt Peak	Deep Ecliptic Survey	·	2.0 km	MPC · JPL
833368	2010 JB_{90}	—	May 10, 2010	WISE	WISE	·	3.1 km	MPC · JPL
833369	2010 JF_{90}	—	May 10, 2010	WISE	WISE	·	2.9 km	MPC · JPL
833370	2010 JG_{90}	—	May 10, 2010	WISE	WISE	·	2.6 km	MPC · JPL
833371	2010 JS_{91}	—	February 13, 2010	Catalina	CSS	·	1.4 km	MPC · JPL
833372	2010 JF_{92}	—	May 10, 2010	WISE	WISE	·	2.9 km	MPC · JPL
833373	2010 JJ_{92}	—	November 8, 2007	Kitt Peak	Spacewatch	·	470 m	MPC · JPL
833374	2010 JM_{92}	—	May 10, 2010	WISE	WISE	·	4.1 km	MPC · JPL
833375	2010 JQ_{92}	—	May 10, 2010	WISE	WISE	·	1.8 km	MPC · JPL
833376	2010 JK_{93}	—	May 10, 2010	WISE	WISE	·	2.9 km	MPC · JPL
833377	2010 JB_{94}	—	May 10, 2010	WISE	WISE	·	2.5 km	MPC · JPL
833378	2010 JV_{94}	—	May 10, 2010	WISE	WISE	·	2.0 km	MPC · JPL
833379	2010 JB_{95}	—	May 10, 2010	WISE	WISE	·	3.1 km	MPC · JPL
833380	2010 JE_{96}	—	May 10, 2010	WISE	WISE	·	2.0 km	MPC · JPL
833381	2010 JH_{96}	—	May 10, 2010	WISE	WISE	·	3.9 km	MPC · JPL
833382	2010 JK_{96}	—	May 10, 2010	WISE	WISE	·	3.5 km	MPC · JPL
833383	2010 JK_{97}	—	May 11, 2010	WISE	WISE	·	2.1 km	MPC · JPL
833384	2010 JO_{97}	—	January 15, 2004	Kitt Peak	Spacewatch	LUT	3.2 km	MPC · JPL
833385	2010 JY_{97}	—	May 11, 2010	WISE	WISE	LIX	3.1 km	MPC · JPL
833386	2010 JZ_{97}	—	May 11, 2010	WISE	WISE	·	1.8 km	MPC · JPL
833387	2010 JJ_{98}	—	November 19, 2008	Mount Lemmon	Mount Lemmon Survey	·	2.4 km	MPC · JPL
833388	2010 JK_{98}	—	February 19, 2010	Catalina	CSS	·	1.5 km	MPC · JPL
833389	2010 JW_{98}	—	May 11, 2010	WISE	WISE	·	2.5 km	MPC · JPL
833390	2010 JD_{99}	—	May 11, 2010	WISE	WISE	·	2.3 km	MPC · JPL
833391	2010 JE_{99}	—	May 11, 2010	WISE	WISE	·	2.4 km	MPC · JPL
833392	2010 JR_{99}	—	May 11, 2010	WISE	WISE	·	1.4 km	MPC · JPL
833393	2010 JV_{100}	—	May 11, 2010	WISE	WISE	·	2.5 km	MPC · JPL
833394	2010 JZ_{100}	—	May 11, 2010	WISE	WISE	·	1.1 km	MPC · JPL
833395	2010 JC_{101}	—	November 26, 2003	Kitt Peak	Spacewatch	·	1.5 km	MPC · JPL
833396	2010 JD_{102}	—	May 11, 2010	WISE	WISE	·	2.7 km	MPC · JPL
833397	2010 JR_{102}	—	May 11, 2010	WISE	WISE	LIX	2.8 km	MPC · JPL
833398	2010 JH_{103}	—	May 11, 2010	WISE	WISE	LIX	2.6 km	MPC · JPL
833399	2010 JR_{103}	—	May 11, 2010	WISE	WISE	EOS	3.4 km	MPC · JPL
833400	2010 JL_{104}	—	March 20, 1999	Sacramento Peak	SDSS	TRE	2.7 km	MPC · JPL

== 833401–833500 ==
back to top

Designation			Discovery			Properties		Ref
Permanent	Provisional	Named after	Date	Site	Discoverer(s)	Category	Diam.	Ref
833401	2010 JM_{104}	—	May 12, 2010	WISE	WISE	·	2.5 km	MPC · JPL
833402	2010 JT_{105}	—	May 12, 2010	WISE	WISE	·	2.4 km	MPC · JPL
833403	2010 JY_{105}	—	May 12, 2010	WISE	WISE	LIX	2.6 km	MPC · JPL
833404	2010 JS_{106}	—	May 13, 2010	WISE	WISE	ADE	1.8 km	MPC · JPL
833405	2010 JC_{108}	—	May 12, 2010	WISE	WISE	·	2.2 km	MPC · JPL
833406	2010 JD_{108}	—	May 12, 2010	WISE	WISE	·	1.8 km	MPC · JPL
833407	2010 JZ_{108}	—	May 12, 2010	WISE	WISE	·	2.6 km	MPC · JPL
833408	2010 JY_{109}	—	May 12, 2010	WISE	WISE	·	3.1 km	MPC · JPL
833409	2010 JB_{118}	—	May 8, 2010	Mount Lemmon	Mount Lemmon Survey	GEF	860 m	MPC · JPL
833410	2010 JV_{121}	—	May 13, 2010	Kitt Peak	Spacewatch	PHO	690 m	MPC · JPL
833411	2010 JO_{122}	—	May 13, 2010	Kitt Peak	Spacewatch	·	1.3 km	MPC · JPL
833412	2010 JU_{124}	—	May 12, 2010	WISE	WISE	·	2.1 km	MPC · JPL
833413	2010 JN_{125}	—	June 17, 2015	Haleakala	Pan-STARRS 1	·	2.6 km	MPC · JPL
833414	2010 JY_{125}	—	October 20, 2006	Mount Lemmon	Mount Lemmon Survey	·	1.4 km	MPC · JPL
833415	2010 JN_{126}	—	October 8, 2004	Tucson	R. A. Tucker	ADE	2.5 km	MPC · JPL
833416	2010 JX_{126}	—	May 13, 2010	WISE	WISE	·	2.6 km	MPC · JPL
833417	2010 JM_{127}	—	November 2, 2008	Mount Lemmon	Mount Lemmon Survey	·	2.9 km	MPC · JPL
833418	2010 JY_{127}	—	May 13, 2010	WISE	WISE	·	2.3 km	MPC · JPL
833419	2010 JH_{128}	—	May 13, 2010	WISE	WISE	EUP	2.5 km	MPC · JPL
833420	2010 JJ_{128}	—	May 13, 2010	WISE	WISE	·	4.3 km	MPC · JPL
833421	2010 JM_{128}	—	May 13, 2010	WISE	WISE	·	2.1 km	MPC · JPL
833422	2010 JN_{128}	—	May 13, 2010	WISE	WISE	·	4.5 km	MPC · JPL
833423	2010 JH_{129}	—	October 11, 2007	Mount Lemmon	Mount Lemmon Survey	·	610 m	MPC · JPL
833424	2010 JP_{129}	—	March 2, 2009	Mount Lemmon	Mount Lemmon Survey	·	2.1 km	MPC · JPL
833425	2010 JG_{130}	—	May 13, 2010	WISE	WISE	·	2.8 km	MPC · JPL
833426	2010 JL_{130}	—	May 13, 2010	WISE	WISE	·	2.6 km	MPC · JPL
833427	2010 JQ_{130}	—	February 15, 2010	Mount Lemmon	Mount Lemmon Survey	·	1.2 km	MPC · JPL
833428	2010 JF_{131}	—	May 13, 2010	WISE	WISE	·	2.9 km	MPC · JPL
833429	2010 JP_{131}	—	May 13, 2010	WISE	WISE	·	2.7 km	MPC · JPL
833430	2010 JF_{132}	—	May 13, 2010	WISE	WISE	·	2.1 km	MPC · JPL
833431	2010 JG_{132}	—	May 13, 2010	WISE	WISE	·	2.8 km	MPC · JPL
833432	2010 JA_{133}	—	May 13, 2010	WISE	WISE	·	1.3 km	MPC · JPL
833433	2010 JW_{133}	—	April 21, 2006	Kitt Peak	Spacewatch	·	2.0 km	MPC · JPL
833434	2010 JV_{134}	—	July 5, 2003	Kitt Peak	Spacewatch	·	1.8 km	MPC · JPL
833435	2010 JB_{135}	—	May 14, 2010	WISE	WISE	·	2.3 km	MPC · JPL
833436	2010 JL_{135}	—	May 14, 2010	WISE	WISE	·	2.7 km	MPC · JPL
833437	2010 JA_{136}	—	May 14, 2010	WISE	WISE	·	2.1 km	MPC · JPL
833438	2010 JD_{136}	—	March 12, 1999	Kitt Peak	Spacewatch	·	2.9 km	MPC · JPL
833439	2010 JO_{136}	—	October 3, 2005	Catalina	CSS	·	2.9 km	MPC · JPL
833440	2010 JY_{136}	—	May 14, 2010	WISE	WISE	·	1.7 km	MPC · JPL
833441	2010 JF_{137}	—	May 14, 2010	WISE	WISE	·	2.1 km	MPC · JPL
833442	2010 JD_{138}	—	May 14, 2010	WISE	WISE	EUP	4.0 km	MPC · JPL
833443	2010 JQ_{138}	—	May 14, 2010	WISE	WISE	ADE	2.2 km	MPC · JPL
833444	2010 JK_{139}	—	May 14, 2010	WISE	WISE	EUP	2.8 km	MPC · JPL
833445	2010 JR_{139}	—	May 14, 2010	WISE	WISE	·	2.0 km	MPC · JPL
833446	2010 JH_{140}	—	February 15, 2010	Mount Lemmon	Mount Lemmon Survey	·	1.5 km	MPC · JPL
833447	2010 JN_{140}	—	May 15, 2010	WISE	WISE	·	2.5 km	MPC · JPL
833448	2010 JL_{141}	—	May 15, 2010	WISE	WISE	·	2.2 km	MPC · JPL
833449	2010 JC_{142}	—	May 15, 2010	WISE	WISE	·	1.3 km	MPC · JPL
833450	2010 JJ_{142}	—	May 15, 2010	WISE	WISE	·	2.6 km	MPC · JPL
833451	2010 JK_{142}	—	February 16, 2010	Mount Lemmon	Mount Lemmon Survey	·	1.2 km	MPC · JPL
833452	2010 JS_{142}	—	May 15, 2010	WISE	WISE	·	2.1 km	MPC · JPL
833453	2010 JB_{143}	—	May 15, 2010	WISE	WISE	·	2.7 km	MPC · JPL
833454	2010 JL_{143}	—	May 15, 2010	WISE	WISE	EOS	1.7 km	MPC · JPL
833455	2010 JM_{143}	—	February 19, 2010	Mount Lemmon	Mount Lemmon Survey	LUT	2.9 km	MPC · JPL
833456	2010 JA_{145}	—	May 15, 2010	WISE	WISE	·	2.3 km	MPC · JPL
833457	2010 JE_{147}	—	April 10, 2010	Mount Lemmon	Mount Lemmon Survey	THB	2.8 km	MPC · JPL
833458	2010 JC_{150}	—	April 12, 2010	Kitt Peak	Spacewatch	LIX	3.2 km	MPC · JPL
833459	2010 JM_{151}	—	May 19, 2010	Siding Spring	SSS	APO	540 m	MPC · JPL
833460	2010 JO_{154}	—	April 10, 2010	Kitt Peak	Spacewatch	DOR	2.0 km	MPC · JPL
833461	2010 JR_{162}	—	May 8, 2010	Mount Lemmon	Mount Lemmon Survey	·	1.6 km	MPC · JPL
833462	2010 JB_{163}	—	April 20, 2010	Kitt Peak	Spacewatch	·	2.0 km	MPC · JPL
833463	2010 JA_{169}	—	May 13, 2010	Mount Lemmon	Mount Lemmon Survey	·	2.7 km	MPC · JPL
833464	2010 JH_{170}	—	May 13, 2010	Kitt Peak	Spacewatch	NYS	910 m	MPC · JPL
833465	2010 JN_{170}	—	May 4, 2010	Kitt Peak	Spacewatch	·	740 m	MPC · JPL
833466	2010 JJ_{172}	—	April 6, 2010	Kitt Peak	Spacewatch	·	2.6 km	MPC · JPL
833467	2010 JK_{174}	—	March 25, 2010	Mount Lemmon	Mount Lemmon Survey	·	960 m	MPC · JPL
833468	2010 JG_{175}	—	April 21, 2010	Taunus	S. Karge, R. Kling	·	2.4 km	MPC · JPL
833469	2010 JV_{176}	—	April 9, 2010	Kitt Peak	Spacewatch	·	1.0 km	MPC · JPL
833470	2010 JA_{177}	—	May 12, 2010	Mount Lemmon	Mount Lemmon Survey	H	500 m	MPC · JPL
833471	2010 JJ_{205}	—	January 26, 2015	Haleakala	Pan-STARRS 1	·	1.9 km	MPC · JPL
833472	2010 JD_{210}	—	May 15, 2010	WISE	WISE	·	1.2 km	MPC · JPL
833473	2010 JZ_{210}	—	August 10, 2005	Siding Spring	SSS	T_{j} (2.98)	3.2 km	MPC · JPL
833474	2010 JU_{212}	—	April 9, 2014	Mount Lemmon	Mount Lemmon Survey	·	1.2 km	MPC · JPL
833475	2010 JC_{214}	—	September 30, 2011	Kitt Peak	Spacewatch	V	520 m	MPC · JPL
833476	2010 JD_{214}	—	October 16, 2015	Kitt Peak	Spacewatch	·	820 m	MPC · JPL
833477	2010 JZ_{214}	—	May 13, 2010	Kitt Peak	Spacewatch	RAF	650 m	MPC · JPL
833478	2010 KN_{1}	—	May 16, 2010	WISE	WISE	·	3.8 km	MPC · JPL
833479	2010 KP_{1}	—	May 16, 2010	WISE	WISE	·	2.5 km	MPC · JPL
833480	2010 KK_{2}	—	May 16, 2010	WISE	WISE	·	1.8 km	MPC · JPL
833481	2010 KL_{2}	—	May 16, 2010	WISE	WISE	·	1.9 km	MPC · JPL
833482	2010 KQ_{2}	—	May 16, 2010	WISE	WISE	·	2.9 km	MPC · JPL
833483	2010 KV_{2}	—	May 16, 2010	WISE	WISE	EOS	1.5 km	MPC · JPL
833484	2010 KM_{3}	—	April 9, 2010	Mount Lemmon	Mount Lemmon Survey	·	2.1 km	MPC · JPL
833485	2010 KQ_{3}	—	May 16, 2010	WISE	WISE	·	1.2 km	MPC · JPL
833486	2010 KU_{3}	—	May 16, 2010	WISE	WISE	·	1.3 km	MPC · JPL
833487	2010 KX_{4}	—	May 16, 2010	WISE	WISE	·	3.0 km	MPC · JPL
833488	2010 KO_{5}	—	February 13, 2010	Mount Lemmon	Mount Lemmon Survey	·	2.9 km	MPC · JPL
833489	2010 KS_{5}	—	May 16, 2010	WISE	WISE	·	2.1 km	MPC · JPL
833490	2010 KL_{6}	—	May 16, 2010	WISE	WISE	·	4.4 km	MPC · JPL
833491	2010 KJ_{11}	—	May 17, 2010	WISE	WISE	·	2.6 km	MPC · JPL
833492	2010 KV_{11}	—	May 18, 2010	WISE	WISE	·	3.0 km	MPC · JPL
833493	2010 KN_{12}	—	May 16, 2010	WISE	WISE	·	2.5 km	MPC · JPL
833494	2010 KO_{12}	—	March 3, 2009	Kitt Peak	Spacewatch	·	2.1 km	MPC · JPL
833495	2010 KB_{14}	—	May 16, 2010	WISE	WISE	·	2.2 km	MPC · JPL
833496	2010 KE_{15}	—	February 7, 2008	Mount Lemmon	Mount Lemmon Survey	(7605)	4.4 km	MPC · JPL
833497	2010 KU_{16}	—	May 17, 2010	WISE	WISE	·	2.0 km	MPC · JPL
833498	2010 KB_{17}	—	May 17, 2010	WISE	WISE	·	1.3 km	MPC · JPL
833499	2010 KR_{17}	—	May 17, 2010	WISE	WISE	LIX	2.9 km	MPC · JPL
833500	2010 KX_{18}	—	May 17, 2010	WISE	WISE	·	4.7 km	MPC · JPL

== 833501–833600 ==
back to top

Designation			Discovery			Properties		Ref
Permanent	Provisional	Named after	Date	Site	Discoverer(s)	Category	Diam.	Ref
833501	2010 KA_{19}	—	May 17, 2010	WISE	WISE	·	2.5 km	MPC · JPL
833502	2010 KH_{19}	—	March 25, 2006	Kitt Peak	Spacewatch	·	1.4 km	MPC · JPL
833503	2010 KG_{20}	—	May 17, 2010	WISE	WISE	·	3.5 km	MPC · JPL
833504	2010 KD_{22}	—	May 18, 2010	WISE	WISE	EMA	2.4 km	MPC · JPL
833505	2010 KG_{22}	—	May 18, 2010	WISE	WISE	·	1.8 km	MPC · JPL
833506	2010 KP_{22}	—	May 18, 2010	WISE	WISE	·	2.9 km	MPC · JPL
833507	2010 KQ_{23}	—	April 18, 2009	Kitt Peak	Spacewatch	·	3.1 km	MPC · JPL
833508	2010 KZ_{23}	—	May 18, 2010	WISE	WISE	·	1.8 km	MPC · JPL
833509	2010 KJ_{24}	—	May 18, 2010	WISE	WISE	·	2.7 km	MPC · JPL
833510	2010 KZ_{24}	—	May 18, 2010	WISE	WISE	·	2.7 km	MPC · JPL
833511	2010 KN_{25}	—	February 15, 2010	Catalina	CSS	·	1.8 km	MPC · JPL
833512	2010 KS_{25}	—	May 18, 2010	WISE	WISE	·	2.5 km	MPC · JPL
833513	2010 KF_{26}	—	August 29, 2016	Mount Lemmon	Mount Lemmon Survey	(7605)	3.2 km	MPC · JPL
833514	2010 KN_{26}	—	December 16, 2006	Mount Lemmon	Mount Lemmon Survey	TIN	1.7 km	MPC · JPL
833515	2010 KU_{27}	—	May 18, 2010	WISE	WISE	·	4.3 km	MPC · JPL
833516	2010 KW_{27}	—	May 18, 2010	WISE	WISE	·	2.5 km	MPC · JPL
833517	2010 KE_{28}	—	May 18, 2010	WISE	WISE	·	2.5 km	MPC · JPL
833518	2010 KP_{28}	—	May 1, 2009	Mount Lemmon	Mount Lemmon Survey	·	4.2 km	MPC · JPL
833519	2010 KQ_{29}	—	May 18, 2010	WISE	WISE	·	2.5 km	MPC · JPL
833520	2010 KU_{29}	—	May 18, 2010	WISE	WISE	·	2.5 km	MPC · JPL
833521	2010 KD_{30}	—	October 13, 2001	Anderson Mesa	LONEOS	CLO	2.2 km	MPC · JPL
833522	2010 KL_{30}	—	May 18, 2010	WISE	WISE	(7605)	2.4 km	MPC · JPL
833523	2010 KH_{31}	—	May 19, 2010	WISE	WISE	·	2.6 km	MPC · JPL
833524	2010 KO_{31}	—	May 19, 2010	WISE	WISE	·	3.3 km	MPC · JPL
833525	2010 KV_{31}	—	May 19, 2010	WISE	WISE	PHO	840 m	MPC · JPL
833526	2010 KY_{32}	—	May 19, 2010	WISE	WISE	·	2.6 km	MPC · JPL
833527	2010 KB_{33}	—	March 6, 2010	Rodeo	T. Vorobjov	DOR	2.3 km	MPC · JPL
833528	2010 KQ_{33}	—	May 19, 2010	WISE	WISE	·	2.1 km	MPC · JPL
833529	2010 KF_{35}	—	May 19, 2010	WISE	WISE	·	2.5 km	MPC · JPL
833530	2010 KW_{35}	—	May 19, 2010	WISE	WISE	·	1.8 km	MPC · JPL
833531	2010 KD_{40}	—	April 30, 2014	Haleakala	Pan-STARRS 1	·	3.1 km	MPC · JPL
833532	2010 KO_{40}	—	November 1, 2005	Catalina	CSS	T_{j} (2.95)	2.2 km	MPC · JPL
833533	2010 KT_{40}	—	May 19, 2010	WISE	WISE	EOS	2.9 km	MPC · JPL
833534	2010 KK_{41}	—	May 19, 2010	WISE	WISE	·	2.0 km	MPC · JPL
833535	2010 KU_{41}	—	May 20, 2010	WISE	WISE	·	2.3 km	MPC · JPL
833536	2010 KN_{42}	—	May 20, 2010	WISE	WISE	·	4.7 km	MPC · JPL
833537	2010 KV_{43}	—	May 20, 2010	WISE	WISE	·	2.0 km	MPC · JPL
833538	2010 KB_{44}	—	May 20, 2010	WISE	WISE	THB	3.4 km	MPC · JPL
833539	2010 KG_{44}	—	May 20, 2010	WISE	WISE	·	3.6 km	MPC · JPL
833540	2010 KL_{44}	—	May 20, 2010	WISE	WISE	·	3.2 km	MPC · JPL
833541	2010 KN_{44}	—	May 20, 2010	WISE	WISE	·	4.4 km	MPC · JPL
833542	2010 KS_{44}	—	May 20, 2010	WISE	WISE	·	3.0 km	MPC · JPL
833543	2010 KZ_{44}	—	May 20, 2010	WISE	WISE	EMA	2.5 km	MPC · JPL
833544	2010 KF_{45}	—	May 20, 2010	WISE	WISE	LUT	3.5 km	MPC · JPL
833545	2010 KH_{45}	—	May 20, 2010	WISE	WISE	·	2.9 km	MPC · JPL
833546	2010 KV_{45}	—	May 21, 2010	WISE	WISE	·	3.2 km	MPC · JPL
833547	2010 KW_{45}	—	May 4, 2009	Mount Lemmon	Mount Lemmon Survey	·	2.1 km	MPC · JPL
833548	2010 KA_{46}	—	November 27, 2006	Mount Lemmon	Mount Lemmon Survey	·	2.9 km	MPC · JPL
833549	2010 KU_{46}	—	May 21, 2010	WISE	WISE	TIN	880 m	MPC · JPL
833550	2010 KW_{46}	—	April 24, 2009	Mount Lemmon	Mount Lemmon Survey	·	2.9 km	MPC · JPL
833551	2010 KC_{48}	—	May 21, 2010	WISE	WISE	·	1.9 km	MPC · JPL
833552	2010 KF_{48}	—	May 21, 2010	WISE	WISE	·	2.6 km	MPC · JPL
833553	2010 KQ_{49}	—	May 22, 2010	WISE	WISE	PHO	1.7 km	MPC · JPL
833554	2010 KZ_{49}	—	May 22, 2010	WISE	WISE	EUN	800 m	MPC · JPL
833555	2010 KD_{51}	—	May 22, 2010	WISE	WISE	·	1.5 km	MPC · JPL
833556	2010 KF_{51}	—	May 22, 2010	WISE	WISE	PHO	1.5 km	MPC · JPL
833557	2010 KX_{51}	—	May 22, 2010	WISE	WISE	·	1.8 km	MPC · JPL
833558	2010 KR_{52}	—	May 23, 2010	WISE	WISE	T_{j} (2.98)	2.8 km	MPC · JPL
833559	2010 KC_{54}	—	January 8, 2010	Mount Lemmon	Mount Lemmon Survey	THB	2.9 km	MPC · JPL
833560	2010 KH_{54}	—	October 21, 2006	Mount Lemmon	Mount Lemmon Survey	·	1.5 km	MPC · JPL
833561	2010 KS_{54}	—	May 23, 2010	WISE	WISE	EUN	2.4 km	MPC · JPL
833562	2010 KY_{54}	—	November 14, 2015	Mount Lemmon	Mount Lemmon Survey	·	2.5 km	MPC · JPL
833563	2010 KM_{55}	—	May 23, 2010	WISE	WISE	·	2.6 km	MPC · JPL
833564	2010 KL_{57}	—	May 20, 2010	WISE	WISE	·	2.5 km	MPC · JPL
833565	2010 KS_{57}	—	May 20, 2010	WISE	WISE	·	2.1 km	MPC · JPL
833566	2010 KC_{58}	—	January 8, 2007	Mount Lemmon	Mount Lemmon Survey	·	1.7 km	MPC · JPL
833567	2010 KZ_{58}	—	May 22, 2010	WISE	WISE	·	2.1 km	MPC · JPL
833568	2010 KK_{59}	—	May 23, 2010	WISE	WISE	ADE	1.4 km	MPC · JPL
833569	2010 KN_{59}	—	May 23, 2010	WISE	WISE	·	3.2 km	MPC · JPL
833570	2010 KQ_{59}	—	May 23, 2010	WISE	WISE	LIX	2.8 km	MPC · JPL
833571	2010 KU_{59}	—	April 15, 2010	Kitt Peak	Spacewatch	·	3.4 km	MPC · JPL
833572	2010 KF_{61}	—	May 27, 2010	WISE	WISE	·	4.6 km	MPC · JPL
833573	2010 KR_{61}	—	May 29, 2010	WISE	WISE	·	4.0 km	MPC · JPL
833574	2010 KW_{62}	—	May 23, 2010	WISE	WISE	·	2.9 km	MPC · JPL
833575	2010 KT_{63}	—	May 23, 2010	WISE	WISE	·	2.7 km	MPC · JPL
833576	2010 KA_{64}	—	May 23, 2010	WISE	WISE	HYG	2.3 km	MPC · JPL
833577	2010 KB_{64}	—	May 23, 2010	WISE	WISE	·	2.1 km	MPC · JPL
833578	2010 KC_{64}	—	May 23, 2010	WISE	WISE	LIX	2.6 km	MPC · JPL
833579	2010 KH_{64}	—	May 23, 2010	WISE	WISE	·	2.3 km	MPC · JPL
833580	2010 KX_{64}	—	May 24, 2010	WISE	WISE	·	4.3 km	MPC · JPL
833581	2010 KY_{64}	—	May 24, 2010	WISE	WISE	·	2.4 km	MPC · JPL
833582	2010 KC_{65}	—	May 24, 2010	WISE	WISE	ADE	1.4 km	MPC · JPL
833583	2010 KU_{66}	—	May 24, 2010	WISE	WISE	·	2.8 km	MPC · JPL
833584	2010 KD_{67}	—	April 1, 2016	Mount Lemmon	Mount Lemmon Survey	·	2.8 km	MPC · JPL
833585	2010 KL_{68}	—	May 24, 2010	WISE	WISE	·	3.5 km	MPC · JPL
833586	2010 KW_{68}	—	May 24, 2010	WISE	WISE	T_{j} (2.92)	4.7 km	MPC · JPL
833587	2010 KH_{70}	—	May 24, 2010	WISE	WISE	LUT	2.9 km	MPC · JPL
833588	2010 KJ_{70}	—	May 24, 2010	WISE	WISE	·	2.2 km	MPC · JPL
833589	2010 KV_{70}	—	May 24, 2010	WISE	WISE	·	3.8 km	MPC · JPL
833590	2010 KJ_{71}	—	May 24, 2010	WISE	WISE	·	2.7 km	MPC · JPL
833591	2010 KJ_{72}	—	May 25, 2010	WISE	WISE	·	2.8 km	MPC · JPL
833592	2010 KL_{72}	—	February 28, 2014	Haleakala	Pan-STARRS 1	·	2.6 km	MPC · JPL
833593	2010 KM_{72}	—	May 25, 2010	WISE	WISE	ULA	3.6 km	MPC · JPL
833594	2010 KP_{73}	—	May 25, 2010	WISE	WISE	·	2.3 km	MPC · JPL
833595	2010 KQ_{73}	—	May 25, 2010	WISE	WISE	DOR	2.0 km	MPC · JPL
833596	2010 KH_{75}	—	May 25, 2010	WISE	WISE	·	4.5 km	MPC · JPL
833597	2010 KN_{75}	—	May 25, 2010	WISE	WISE	·	3.1 km	MPC · JPL
833598	2010 KX_{75}	—	April 6, 2010	Mount Lemmon	Mount Lemmon Survey	·	2.5 km	MPC · JPL
833599	2010 KY_{75}	—	May 25, 2010	WISE	WISE	·	2.1 km	MPC · JPL
833600	2010 KS_{78}	—	May 25, 2010	WISE	WISE	·	1.3 km	MPC · JPL

== 833601–833700 ==
back to top

Designation			Discovery			Properties		Ref
Permanent	Provisional	Named after	Date	Site	Discoverer(s)	Category	Diam.	Ref
833601	2010 KO_{79}	—	May 25, 2010	WISE	WISE	·	2.2 km	MPC · JPL
833602	2010 KU_{79}	—	May 25, 2010	WISE	WISE	·	2.4 km	MPC · JPL
833603	2010 KC_{80}	—	May 25, 2010	WISE	WISE	·	3.7 km	MPC · JPL
833604	2010 KH_{80}	—	February 18, 2010	Kitt Peak	Spacewatch	·	2.1 km	MPC · JPL
833605	2010 KC_{81}	—	March 3, 2009	Catalina	CSS	·	1.8 km	MPC · JPL
833606	2010 KW_{81}	—	May 26, 2010	WISE	WISE	·	1.5 km	MPC · JPL
833607	2010 KX_{82}	—	May 26, 2010	WISE	WISE	·	2.0 km	MPC · JPL
833608	2010 KU_{83}	—	May 26, 2010	WISE	WISE	·	2.9 km	MPC · JPL
833609	2010 KV_{83}	—	May 13, 2010	Kitt Peak	Spacewatch	·	3.7 km	MPC · JPL
833610	2010 KO_{84}	—	May 26, 2010	WISE	WISE	·	2.9 km	MPC · JPL
833611	2010 KU_{84}	—	May 26, 2010	WISE	WISE	PHO	2.0 km	MPC · JPL
833612	2010 KX_{84}	—	May 26, 2010	WISE	WISE	ADE	1.9 km	MPC · JPL
833613	2010 KO_{85}	—	May 26, 2010	WISE	WISE	·	2.6 km	MPC · JPL
833614	2010 KV_{86}	—	May 26, 2010	WISE	WISE	·	2.5 km	MPC · JPL
833615	2010 KZ_{87}	—	May 26, 2010	WISE	WISE	·	3.2 km	MPC · JPL
833616	2010 KG_{88}	—	February 17, 2010	Kitt Peak	Spacewatch	·	2.3 km	MPC · JPL
833617	2010 KO_{88}	—	May 26, 2010	WISE	WISE	·	3.4 km	MPC · JPL
833618	2010 KQ_{88}	—	October 27, 2005	Kitt Peak	Spacewatch	·	3.2 km	MPC · JPL
833619	2010 KJ_{89}	—	May 27, 2010	WISE	WISE	·	3.4 km	MPC · JPL
833620	2010 KP_{89}	—	May 27, 2010	WISE	WISE	·	1.2 km	MPC · JPL
833621	2010 KU_{91}	—	January 6, 2013	Kitt Peak	Spacewatch	·	3.2 km	MPC · JPL
833622	2010 KM_{92}	—	May 27, 2010	WISE	WISE	·	2.0 km	MPC · JPL
833623	2010 KV_{92}	—	February 13, 2010	Mount Lemmon	Mount Lemmon Survey	THB	2.9 km	MPC · JPL
833624	2010 KJ_{93}	—	May 27, 2010	WISE	WISE	·	960 m	MPC · JPL
833625	2010 KS_{93}	—	May 27, 2010	WISE	WISE	·	3.3 km	MPC · JPL
833626	2010 KC_{94}	—	February 15, 2010	Kitt Peak	Spacewatch	·	1.4 km	MPC · JPL
833627	2010 KP_{95}	—	November 16, 2006	Mount Lemmon	Mount Lemmon Survey	·	3.3 km	MPC · JPL
833628	2010 KX_{95}	—	May 27, 2010	WISE	WISE	·	2.9 km	MPC · JPL
833629	2010 KV_{96}	—	May 28, 2010	WISE	WISE	·	3.2 km	MPC · JPL
833630	2010 KM_{98}	—	May 28, 2010	WISE	WISE	·	1.4 km	MPC · JPL
833631	2010 KD_{99}	—	May 28, 2010	WISE	WISE	·	3.2 km	MPC · JPL
833632	2010 KK_{99}	—	May 4, 2009	Mount Lemmon	Mount Lemmon Survey	·	3.0 km	MPC · JPL
833633	2010 KS_{100}	—	May 28, 2010	WISE	WISE	JUN	2.0 km	MPC · JPL
833634	2010 KD_{101}	—	November 2, 2008	Kitt Peak	Spacewatch	·	2.2 km	MPC · JPL
833635	2010 KU_{101}	—	May 28, 2010	WISE	WISE	·	3.4 km	MPC · JPL
833636	2010 KK_{102}	—	May 28, 2010	WISE	WISE	LIX	2.6 km	MPC · JPL
833637	2010 KN_{102}	—	May 28, 2010	WISE	WISE	·	2.2 km	MPC · JPL
833638	2010 KG_{103}	—	May 28, 2010	WISE	WISE	·	1.2 km	MPC · JPL
833639	2010 KH_{103}	—	May 28, 2010	WISE	WISE	·	1.4 km	MPC · JPL
833640	2010 KC_{104}	—	May 29, 2010	WISE	WISE	·	3.4 km	MPC · JPL
833641	2010 KF_{104}	—	May 29, 2010	WISE	WISE	·	3.9 km	MPC · JPL
833642	2010 KM_{105}	—	May 29, 2010	WISE	WISE	·	1.1 km	MPC · JPL
833643	2010 KZ_{105}	—	February 15, 2010	Catalina	CSS	·	2.2 km	MPC · JPL
833644	2010 KQ_{107}	—	October 29, 2008	Mount Lemmon	Mount Lemmon Survey	·	3.1 km	MPC · JPL
833645	2010 KW_{107}	—	May 29, 2010	WISE	WISE	·	1.2 km	MPC · JPL
833646	2010 KC_{108}	—	May 29, 2010	WISE	WISE	·	2.4 km	MPC · JPL
833647	2010 KO_{108}	—	May 29, 2010	WISE	WISE	·	2.8 km	MPC · JPL
833648	2010 KH_{109}	—	May 29, 2010	WISE	WISE	·	2.5 km	MPC · JPL
833649	2010 KS_{109}	—	October 27, 2008	Kitt Peak	Spacewatch	·	2.0 km	MPC · JPL
833650	2010 KN_{111}	—	May 30, 2010	WISE	WISE	·	2.5 km	MPC · JPL
833651	2010 KO_{111}	—	May 30, 2010	WISE	WISE	ADE	1.7 km	MPC · JPL
833652	2010 KX_{111}	—	May 30, 2010	WISE	WISE	·	3.8 km	MPC · JPL
833653	2010 KR_{112}	—	August 17, 2002	Palomar	NEAT	T_{j} (2.98) · 3:2	3.7 km	MPC · JPL
833654	2010 KW_{112}	—	September 18, 2006	Anderson Mesa	LONEOS	KON	2.5 km	MPC · JPL
833655	2010 KY_{112}	—	May 30, 2010	WISE	WISE	·	3.4 km	MPC · JPL
833656	2010 KZ_{113}	—	May 30, 2010	WISE	WISE	·	3.2 km	MPC · JPL
833657	2010 KB_{116}	—	May 30, 2010	WISE	WISE	PHO	2.0 km	MPC · JPL
833658	2010 KV_{116}	—	May 30, 2010	WISE	WISE	·	2.4 km	MPC · JPL
833659	2010 KG_{118}	—	May 31, 2010	WISE	WISE	·	1.1 km	MPC · JPL
833660	2010 KJ_{118}	—	November 30, 2008	Mount Lemmon	Mount Lemmon Survey	·	3.5 km	MPC · JPL
833661	2010 KN_{118}	—	May 30, 2010	WISE	WISE	LIX	3.3 km	MPC · JPL
833662	2010 KU_{118}	—	May 30, 2010	WISE	WISE	T_{j} (2.96)	3.4 km	MPC · JPL
833663	2010 KZ_{118}	—	May 30, 2010	WISE	WISE	·	3.0 km	MPC · JPL
833664	2010 KE_{119}	—	May 30, 2010	WISE	WISE	·	2.4 km	MPC · JPL
833665	2010 KV_{119}	—	May 30, 2010	WISE	WISE	·	2.6 km	MPC · JPL
833666	2010 KK_{120}	—	May 31, 2010	WISE	WISE	·	1.9 km	MPC · JPL
833667	2010 KB_{121}	—	October 13, 1999	Sacramento Peak	SDSS	·	2.4 km	MPC · JPL
833668	2010 KY_{121}	—	May 31, 2010	WISE	WISE	·	2.6 km	MPC · JPL
833669	2010 KG_{123}	—	May 31, 2010	WISE	WISE	·	2.3 km	MPC · JPL
833670	2010 KN_{124}	—	May 31, 2010	WISE	WISE	·	1.9 km	MPC · JPL
833671	2010 KF_{125}	—	May 31, 2010	WISE	WISE	·	1.7 km	MPC · JPL
833672	2010 KV_{125}	—	May 31, 2010	WISE	WISE	·	2.9 km	MPC · JPL
833673	2010 KX_{125}	—	May 31, 2010	WISE	WISE	·	3.2 km	MPC · JPL
833674	2010 KH_{126}	—	May 31, 2010	WISE	WISE	T_{j} (2.99) · EUP	2.2 km	MPC · JPL
833675	2010 KJ_{126}	—	May 31, 2010	WISE	WISE	·	2.4 km	MPC · JPL
833676	2010 KL_{126}	—	May 31, 2010	WISE	WISE	T_{j} (2.95)	3.5 km	MPC · JPL
833677	2010 KH_{127}	—	May 31, 2010	Catalina	CSS	·	1.9 km	MPC · JPL
833678	2010 KW_{136}	—	February 15, 2010	Kitt Peak	Spacewatch	·	2.2 km	MPC · JPL
833679	2010 KB_{157}	—	March 8, 2014	Mount Lemmon	Mount Lemmon Survey	·	1.3 km	MPC · JPL
833680	2010 KC_{157}	—	February 12, 2010	WISE	WISE	·	1.6 km	MPC · JPL
833681	2010 KE_{157}	—	February 16, 2010	WISE	WISE	PHO	720 m	MPC · JPL
833682	2010 KG_{157}	—	May 18, 2010	Siding Spring	SSS	·	980 m	MPC · JPL
833683	2010 KP_{157}	—	February 12, 2010	WISE	WISE	PHO	750 m	MPC · JPL
833684	2010 KS_{158}	—	May 16, 2010	Mount Lemmon	Mount Lemmon Survey	·	1.6 km	MPC · JPL
833685	2010 KY_{159}	—	May 17, 2010	Kitt Peak	Spacewatch	·	900 m	MPC · JPL
833686	2010 LS	—	October 1, 2005	Mount Lemmon	Mount Lemmon Survey	·	830 m	MPC · JPL
833687	2010 LS_{1}	—	June 1, 2010	WISE	WISE	·	2.8 km	MPC · JPL
833688	2010 LZ_{1}	—	June 1, 2010	WISE	WISE	·	4.3 km	MPC · JPL
833689	2010 LA_{2}	—	June 1, 2010	WISE	WISE	·	2.4 km	MPC · JPL
833690	2010 LL_{2}	—	June 1, 2010	WISE	WISE	·	2.4 km	MPC · JPL
833691	2010 LS_{2}	—	June 6, 2010	WISE	WISE	·	1.5 km	MPC · JPL
833692	2010 LX_{3}	—	June 1, 2010	WISE	WISE	·	2.0 km	MPC · JPL
833693	2010 LG_{4}	—	October 27, 2008	Mount Lemmon	Mount Lemmon Survey	·	1.3 km	MPC · JPL
833694	2010 LU_{5}	—	June 1, 2010	WISE	WISE	·	2.6 km	MPC · JPL
833695	2010 LS_{6}	—	June 5, 2010	WISE	WISE	EUP	3.6 km	MPC · JPL
833696	2010 LG_{7}	—	March 14, 2010	Mount Lemmon	Mount Lemmon Survey	·	2.7 km	MPC · JPL
833697	2010 LJ_{7}	—	February 14, 2010	Mount Lemmon	Mount Lemmon Survey	EUP	2.3 km	MPC · JPL
833698	2010 LU_{7}	—	June 1, 2010	WISE	WISE	·	3.4 km	MPC · JPL
833699	2010 LR_{8}	—	June 2, 2010	WISE	WISE	·	2.7 km	MPC · JPL
833700	2010 LS_{9}	—	March 13, 2010	Mount Lemmon	Mount Lemmon Survey	·	1.4 km	MPC · JPL

== 833701–833800 ==
back to top

Designation			Discovery			Properties		Ref
Permanent	Provisional	Named after	Date	Site	Discoverer(s)	Category	Diam.	Ref
833701	2010 LX_{9}	—	June 5, 2010	WISE	WISE	·	3.0 km	MPC · JPL
833702	2010 LY_{9}	—	June 2, 2010	WISE	WISE	THB	2.2 km	MPC · JPL
833703	2010 LE_{10}	—	June 6, 2010	WISE	WISE	·	2.2 km	MPC · JPL
833704	2010 LU_{10}	—	June 2, 2010	WISE	WISE	URS	2.7 km	MPC · JPL
833705	2010 LV_{10}	—	June 2, 2010	WISE	WISE	·	3.0 km	MPC · JPL
833706	2010 LW_{10}	—	June 2, 2010	WISE	WISE	·	1.4 km	MPC · JPL
833707	2010 LH_{11}	—	June 2, 2010	WISE	WISE	·	2.2 km	MPC · JPL
833708	2010 LV_{12}	—	June 2, 2010	WISE	WISE	LIX	2.3 km	MPC · JPL
833709	2010 LT_{13}	—	June 2, 2010	WISE	WISE	EUP	3.3 km	MPC · JPL
833710	2010 LC_{15}	—	May 11, 2010	Mount Lemmon	Mount Lemmon Survey	·	490 m	MPC · JPL
833711	2010 LO_{15}	—	November 4, 2007	Socorro	LINEAR	EUP	5.9 km	MPC · JPL
833712	2010 LU_{19}	—	March 21, 2010	Mount Lemmon	Mount Lemmon Survey	·	3.6 km	MPC · JPL
833713	2010 LV_{19}	—	June 3, 2010	WISE	WISE	·	3.0 km	MPC · JPL
833714	2010 LM_{20}	—	February 19, 2010	Kitt Peak	Spacewatch	·	1.4 km	MPC · JPL
833715	2010 LY_{20}	—	June 3, 2010	WISE	WISE	(69559)	3.5 km	MPC · JPL
833716	2010 LG_{21}	—	October 8, 2005	Kitt Peak	Spacewatch	·	2.5 km	MPC · JPL
833717	2010 LJ_{21}	—	June 3, 2010	WISE	WISE	·	3.6 km	MPC · JPL
833718	2010 LQ_{21}	—	June 3, 2010	WISE	WISE	·	1.7 km	MPC · JPL
833719	2010 LJ_{22}	—	June 4, 2010	WISE	WISE	·	2.0 km	MPC · JPL
833720	2010 LU_{22}	—	June 4, 2010	WISE	WISE	·	1.8 km	MPC · JPL
833721	2010 LO_{23}	—	June 4, 2010	WISE	WISE	ADE	2.0 km	MPC · JPL
833722	2010 LT_{23}	—	June 4, 2010	WISE	WISE	·	2.8 km	MPC · JPL
833723	2010 LB_{24}	—	June 4, 2010	WISE	WISE	·	2.3 km	MPC · JPL
833724	2010 LL_{24}	—	June 4, 2010	WISE	WISE	·	2.6 km	MPC · JPL
833725	2010 LA_{25}	—	June 5, 2010	WISE	WISE	·	3.0 km	MPC · JPL
833726	2010 LC_{25}	—	May 21, 2015	Haleakala	Pan-STARRS 1	·	1.2 km	MPC · JPL
833727	2010 LY_{25}	—	March 14, 2010	Mount Lemmon	Mount Lemmon Survey	·	1.0 km	MPC · JPL
833728	2010 LM_{26}	—	June 5, 2010	WISE	WISE	·	3.3 km	MPC · JPL
833729	2010 LB_{28}	—	March 21, 2010	Mount Lemmon	Mount Lemmon Survey	·	1.5 km	MPC · JPL
833730	2010 LQ_{28}	—	June 6, 2010	WISE	WISE	·	2.9 km	MPC · JPL
833731	2010 LY_{28}	—	June 6, 2010	WISE	WISE	LIX	2.9 km	MPC · JPL
833732	2010 LB_{29}	—	June 6, 2010	WISE	WISE	·	1.9 km	MPC · JPL
833733	2010 LE_{29}	—	April 15, 2016	Haleakala	Pan-STARRS 1	·	3.7 km	MPC · JPL
833734	2010 LG_{29}	—	June 6, 2010	WISE	WISE	·	2.3 km	MPC · JPL
833735	2010 LL_{29}	—	June 6, 2010	WISE	WISE	ARM	2.7 km	MPC · JPL
833736	2010 LL_{30}	—	June 6, 2010	WISE	WISE	·	3.7 km	MPC · JPL
833737	2010 LJ_{31}	—	June 6, 2010	WISE	WISE	·	2.4 km	MPC · JPL
833738	2010 LL_{32}	—	June 6, 2010	WISE	WISE	DOR	2.9 km	MPC · JPL
833739	2010 LL_{33}	—	June 7, 2010	WISE	WISE	·	2.6 km	MPC · JPL
833740	2010 LR_{35}	—	June 7, 2010	Kitt Peak	Spacewatch	·	1.3 km	MPC · JPL
833741	2010 LF_{36}	—	June 8, 2010	WISE	WISE	·	2.7 km	MPC · JPL
833742	2010 LH_{36}	—	June 8, 2010	WISE	WISE	·	4.1 km	MPC · JPL
833743	2010 LJ_{36}	—	June 9, 2010	WISE	WISE	·	3.2 km	MPC · JPL
833744	2010 LA_{37}	—	June 6, 2010	WISE	WISE	THB	2.4 km	MPC · JPL
833745	2010 LR_{37}	—	June 6, 2010	WISE	WISE	T_{j} (2.98)	3.1 km	MPC · JPL
833746	2010 LX_{37}	—	April 18, 2009	Kitt Peak	Spacewatch	THB	2.7 km	MPC · JPL
833747	2010 LG_{38}	—	June 6, 2010	WISE	WISE	·	2.9 km	MPC · JPL
833748	2010 LL_{38}	—	June 7, 2010	WISE	WISE	URS	2.9 km	MPC · JPL
833749	2010 LZ_{38}	—	June 7, 2010	WISE	WISE	·	2.4 km	MPC · JPL
833750	2010 LB_{39}	—	June 7, 2010	WISE	WISE	·	2.6 km	MPC · JPL
833751	2010 LE_{39}	—	June 7, 2010	WISE	WISE	·	2.4 km	MPC · JPL
833752	2010 LN_{39}	—	March 14, 2010	Mount Lemmon	Mount Lemmon Survey	·	1.3 km	MPC · JPL
833753	2010 LM_{41}	—	June 7, 2010	WISE	WISE	·	2.7 km	MPC · JPL
833754	2010 LT_{41}	—	June 7, 2010	WISE	WISE	·	3.3 km	MPC · JPL
833755	2010 LB_{42}	—	June 7, 2010	WISE	WISE	·	2.9 km	MPC · JPL
833756	2010 LX_{42}	—	June 7, 2010	WISE	WISE	·	2.2 km	MPC · JPL
833757	2010 LK_{43}	—	October 8, 2007	Mount Lemmon	Mount Lemmon Survey	·	2.3 km	MPC · JPL
833758	2010 LS_{43}	—	June 7, 2010	WISE	WISE	·	3.0 km	MPC · JPL
833759	2010 LX_{43}	—	June 7, 2010	WISE	WISE	·	2.3 km	MPC · JPL
833760	2010 LE_{44}	—	June 7, 2010	WISE	WISE	LIX	3.4 km	MPC · JPL
833761	2010 LQ_{44}	—	June 7, 2010	WISE	WISE	·	2.6 km	MPC · JPL
833762	2010 LC_{45}	—	June 7, 2010	WISE	WISE	·	3.1 km	MPC · JPL
833763	2010 LM_{45}	—	June 8, 2010	WISE	WISE	·	2.3 km	MPC · JPL
833764	2010 LB_{46}	—	April 5, 2014	Haleakala	Pan-STARRS 1	·	2.9 km	MPC · JPL
833765	2010 LY_{46}	—	June 8, 2010	WISE	WISE	PHO	580 m	MPC · JPL
833766	2010 LD_{47}	—	June 8, 2010	WISE	WISE	·	900 m	MPC · JPL
833767	2010 LZ_{47}	—	November 5, 2007	Mount Lemmon	Mount Lemmon Survey	·	2.4 km	MPC · JPL
833768	2010 LO_{48}	—	June 8, 2010	WISE	WISE	·	2.5 km	MPC · JPL
833769	2010 LR_{48}	—	June 8, 2010	WISE	WISE	·	1.5 km	MPC · JPL
833770	2010 LV_{48}	—	June 8, 2010	WISE	WISE	·	2.7 km	MPC · JPL
833771	2010 LA_{50}	—	June 8, 2010	WISE	WISE	·	3.4 km	MPC · JPL
833772	2010 LE_{50}	—	February 11, 2004	Palomar	NEAT	T_{j} (2.98)	2.6 km	MPC · JPL
833773	2010 LM_{50}	—	June 8, 2010	WISE	WISE	LIX	4.0 km	MPC · JPL
833774	2010 LP_{50}	—	June 8, 2010	WISE	WISE	·	2.8 km	MPC · JPL
833775	2010 LH_{51}	—	June 8, 2010	WISE	WISE	·	2.0 km	MPC · JPL
833776	2010 LQ_{51}	—	June 8, 2010	WISE	WISE	ADE	1.9 km	MPC · JPL
833777	2010 LT_{52}	—	June 8, 2010	WISE	WISE	·	3.1 km	MPC · JPL
833778	2010 LF_{53}	—	June 8, 2010	WISE	WISE	·	2.9 km	MPC · JPL
833779	2010 LW_{53}	—	April 20, 2009	Mount Lemmon	Mount Lemmon Survey	·	1.9 km	MPC · JPL
833780	2010 LM_{54}	—	June 9, 2010	WISE	WISE	DOR	1.9 km	MPC · JPL
833781	2010 LR_{54}	—	June 9, 2010	WISE	WISE	·	2.8 km	MPC · JPL
833782	2010 LX_{54}	—	June 9, 2010	WISE	WISE	·	3.2 km	MPC · JPL
833783	2010 LY_{54}	—	February 17, 2010	Mount Lemmon	Mount Lemmon Survey	LIX	3.1 km	MPC · JPL
833784	2010 LK_{55}	—	June 9, 2010	WISE	WISE	·	2.2 km	MPC · JPL
833785	2010 LS_{56}	—	March 13, 2010	Catalina	CSS	·	3.8 km	MPC · JPL
833786	2010 LA_{57}	—	June 9, 2010	WISE	WISE	HYG	1.9 km	MPC · JPL
833787	2010 LS_{58}	—	June 9, 2010	WISE	WISE	·	820 m	MPC · JPL
833788	2010 LA_{59}	—	June 9, 2010	WISE	WISE	3:2	4.1 km	MPC · JPL
833789	2010 LW_{59}	—	March 15, 2010	Mount Lemmon	Mount Lemmon Survey	·	2.2 km	MPC · JPL
833790	2010 LH_{60}	—	June 9, 2010	WISE	WISE	·	3.0 km	MPC · JPL
833791	2010 LT_{61}	—	June 4, 2010	Nogales	P. R. Holvorcem, M. Schwartz	·	570 m	MPC · JPL
833792	2010 LA_{68}	—	May 11, 2010	Mount Lemmon	Mount Lemmon Survey	·	520 m	MPC · JPL
833793	2010 LX_{68}	—	June 9, 2010	WISE	WISE	·	3.0 km	MPC · JPL
833794	2010 LW_{69}	—	June 9, 2010	WISE	WISE	·	1.4 km	MPC · JPL
833795	2010 LD_{70}	—	June 9, 2010	WISE	WISE	·	3.0 km	MPC · JPL
833796	2010 LZ_{70}	—	June 10, 2010	WISE	WISE	·	2.7 km	MPC · JPL
833797	2010 LW_{71}	—	June 10, 2010	WISE	WISE	·	2.4 km	MPC · JPL
833798	2010 LF_{72}	—	June 10, 2010	WISE	WISE	·	2.4 km	MPC · JPL
833799	2010 LZ_{72}	—	June 10, 2010	WISE	WISE	·	2.8 km	MPC · JPL
833800	2010 LC_{73}	—	June 10, 2010	WISE	WISE	·	2.9 km	MPC · JPL

== 833801–833900 ==
back to top

Designation			Discovery			Properties		Ref
Permanent	Provisional	Named after	Date	Site	Discoverer(s)	Category	Diam.	Ref
833801	2010 LE_{73}	—	June 10, 2010	WISE	WISE	·	3.0 km	MPC · JPL
833802	2010 LX_{74}	—	June 10, 2010	WISE	WISE	·	3.7 km	MPC · JPL
833803	2010 LJ_{75}	—	June 10, 2010	WISE	WISE	·	3.2 km	MPC · JPL
833804	2010 LA_{76}	—	June 10, 2010	WISE	WISE	·	1.2 km	MPC · JPL
833805	2010 LJ_{76}	—	June 10, 2010	WISE	WISE	·	2.9 km	MPC · JPL
833806	2010 LQ_{76}	—	June 10, 2010	WISE	WISE	T_{j} (2.98) · EUP	4.0 km	MPC · JPL
833807	2010 LH_{77}	—	June 10, 2010	WISE	WISE	·	1.9 km	MPC · JPL
833808	2010 LQ_{77}	—	June 10, 2010	WISE	WISE	EUP	2.5 km	MPC · JPL
833809	2010 LS_{78}	—	June 10, 2010	WISE	WISE	HOF	1.8 km	MPC · JPL
833810	2010 LC_{79}	—	June 10, 2010	WISE	WISE	·	2.8 km	MPC · JPL
833811	2010 LE_{79}	—	June 10, 2010	WISE	WISE	·	1.4 km	MPC · JPL
833812	2010 LM_{80}	—	February 16, 2010	Mount Lemmon	Mount Lemmon Survey	T_{j} (2.98) · 3:2	5.5 km	MPC · JPL
833813	2010 LB_{81}	—	June 11, 2010	WISE	WISE	·	1.6 km	MPC · JPL
833814	2010 LE_{81}	—	June 11, 2010	WISE	WISE	·	2.1 km	MPC · JPL
833815	2010 LV_{81}	—	June 11, 2010	WISE	WISE	·	2.5 km	MPC · JPL
833816	2010 LH_{82}	—	June 11, 2010	WISE	WISE	·	2.3 km	MPC · JPL
833817	2010 LG_{83}	—	June 11, 2010	WISE	WISE	·	2.0 km	MPC · JPL
833818	2010 LX_{83}	—	June 11, 2010	WISE	WISE	·	2.3 km	MPC · JPL
833819	2010 LL_{84}	—	April 19, 2009	Kitt Peak	Spacewatch	·	2.9 km	MPC · JPL
833820	2010 LM_{84}	—	June 11, 2010	WISE	WISE	·	2.1 km	MPC · JPL
833821	2010 LY_{84}	—	March 18, 2010	Mount Lemmon	Mount Lemmon Survey	·	2.5 km	MPC · JPL
833822	2010 LZ_{84}	—	June 11, 2010	WISE	WISE	·	840 m	MPC · JPL
833823	2010 LF_{86}	—	June 11, 2010	WISE	WISE	·	2.5 km	MPC · JPL
833824	2010 LH_{86}	—	June 11, 2010	WISE	WISE	·	2.6 km	MPC · JPL
833825	2010 LP_{86}	—	June 11, 2010	WISE	WISE	HYG	3.8 km	MPC · JPL
833826	2010 LZ_{86}	—	June 11, 2010	WISE	WISE	·	2.2 km	MPC · JPL
833827	2010 LH_{88}	—	June 12, 2010	WISE	WISE	·	2.9 km	MPC · JPL
833828	2010 LU_{88}	—	June 12, 2010	WISE	WISE	·	3.3 km	MPC · JPL
833829	2010 LA_{89}	—	June 12, 2010	WISE	WISE	·	2.7 km	MPC · JPL
833830	2010 LJ_{89}	—	February 13, 2015	Haleakala	Pan-STARRS 1	·	2.6 km	MPC · JPL
833831	2010 LN_{89}	—	June 12, 2010	WISE	WISE	·	2.7 km	MPC · JPL
833832	2010 LY_{90}	—	June 12, 2010	WISE	WISE	LIX	3.0 km	MPC · JPL
833833	2010 LA_{91}	—	June 12, 2010	WISE	WISE	·	2.9 km	MPC · JPL
833834	2010 LO_{91}	—	March 20, 2010	Mount Lemmon	Mount Lemmon Survey	·	1.4 km	MPC · JPL
833835	2010 LL_{92}	—	June 12, 2010	WISE	WISE	·	1.8 km	MPC · JPL
833836	2010 LU_{93}	—	June 12, 2010	WISE	WISE	·	2.9 km	MPC · JPL
833837	2010 LD_{94}	—	June 12, 2010	WISE	WISE	·	2.5 km	MPC · JPL
833838	2010 LP_{94}	—	June 12, 2010	WISE	WISE	·	2.3 km	MPC · JPL
833839	2010 LR_{94}	—	June 12, 2010	WISE	WISE	·	2.6 km	MPC · JPL
833840	2010 LD_{95}	—	June 12, 2010	WISE	WISE	·	3.2 km	MPC · JPL
833841	2010 LK_{95}	—	June 12, 2010	WISE	WISE	ADE	2.1 km	MPC · JPL
833842	2010 LN_{95}	—	June 12, 2010	WISE	WISE	ERI	2.1 km	MPC · JPL
833843	2010 LS_{95}	—	June 12, 2010	WISE	WISE	·	3.1 km	MPC · JPL
833844	2010 LV_{95}	—	June 12, 2010	WISE	WISE	EOS	2.5 km	MPC · JPL
833845	2010 LX_{95}	—	June 12, 2010	WISE	WISE	·	1.8 km	MPC · JPL
833846	2010 LY_{95}	—	June 12, 2010	WISE	WISE	·	2.0 km	MPC · JPL
833847	2010 LG_{96}	—	June 12, 2010	WISE	WISE	·	2.3 km	MPC · JPL
833848	2010 LU_{96}	—	June 13, 2010	WISE	WISE	·	3.7 km	MPC · JPL
833849	2010 LX_{96}	—	June 13, 2010	WISE	WISE	·	2.1 km	MPC · JPL
833850	2010 LD_{97}	—	June 13, 2010	WISE	WISE	·	2.1 km	MPC · JPL
833851	2010 LN_{97}	—	June 13, 2010	WISE	WISE	·	1.7 km	MPC · JPL
833852	2010 LF_{98}	—	January 21, 2015	Haleakala	Pan-STARRS 1	ARM	3.0 km	MPC · JPL
833853	2010 LA_{99}	—	June 13, 2010	WISE	WISE	·	910 m	MPC · JPL
833854	2010 LG_{99}	—	June 13, 2010	WISE	WISE	·	5.5 km	MPC · JPL
833855	2010 LY_{99}	—	June 13, 2010	WISE	WISE	·	3.0 km	MPC · JPL
833856	2010 LZ_{99}	—	June 13, 2010	WISE	WISE	·	2.2 km	MPC · JPL
833857	2010 LC_{100}	—	June 13, 2010	WISE	WISE	·	2.9 km	MPC · JPL
833858	2010 LS_{101}	—	June 13, 2010	WISE	WISE	·	4.5 km	MPC · JPL
833859	2010 LD_{102}	—	June 13, 2010	WISE	WISE	EOS	1.6 km	MPC · JPL
833860	2010 LB_{103}	—	June 13, 2010	WISE	WISE	·	2.1 km	MPC · JPL
833861	2010 LJ_{103}	—	June 13, 2010	WISE	WISE	·	1.6 km	MPC · JPL
833862	2010 LK_{103}	—	June 13, 2010	WISE	WISE	·	2.8 km	MPC · JPL
833863	2010 LM_{103}	—	July 4, 2005	Mount Lemmon	Mount Lemmon Survey	·	2.5 km	MPC · JPL
833864	2010 LM_{104}	—	June 14, 2010	Mount Lemmon	Mount Lemmon Survey	·	2.5 km	MPC · JPL
833865	2010 LZ_{108}	—	June 14, 2010	WISE	WISE	·	2.8 km	MPC · JPL
833866	2010 LM_{111}	—	June 6, 2010	Kitt Peak	Spacewatch	·	2.6 km	MPC · JPL
833867	2010 LW_{115}	—	June 13, 2010	WISE	WISE	·	3.3 km	MPC · JPL
833868	2010 LA_{116}	—	June 13, 2010	WISE	WISE	THM	2.9 km	MPC · JPL
833869	2010 LB_{116}	—	June 13, 2010	WISE	WISE	·	3.1 km	MPC · JPL
833870	2010 LV_{116}	—	June 14, 2010	WISE	WISE	TRE	3.7 km	MPC · JPL
833871	2010 LU_{117}	—	June 14, 2010	WISE	WISE	·	2.4 km	MPC · JPL
833872	2010 LG_{119}	—	June 14, 2010	WISE	WISE	·	1.6 km	MPC · JPL
833873	2010 LM_{119}	—	June 14, 2010	WISE	WISE	KON	1.9 km	MPC · JPL
833874	2010 LQ_{119}	—	April 19, 2006	Mount Lemmon	Mount Lemmon Survey	·	2.5 km	MPC · JPL
833875	2010 LB_{120}	—	June 14, 2010	WISE	WISE	·	2.6 km	MPC · JPL
833876	2010 LE_{120}	—	April 6, 2005	Kitt Peak	Spacewatch	·	2.6 km	MPC · JPL
833877	2010 LM_{121}	—	March 8, 2005	Mount Lemmon	Mount Lemmon Survey	·	2.9 km	MPC · JPL
833878	2010 LP_{121}	—	February 16, 2010	Mount Lemmon	Mount Lemmon Survey	·	1.0 km	MPC · JPL
833879	2010 LU_{121}	—	June 14, 2010	WISE	WISE	·	2.3 km	MPC · JPL
833880	2010 LW_{123}	—	June 14, 2010	WISE	WISE	·	1.3 km	MPC · JPL
833881	2010 LE_{124}	—	June 14, 2010	WISE	WISE	·	3.0 km	MPC · JPL
833882	2010 LN_{124}	—	June 14, 2010	WISE	WISE	·	3.4 km	MPC · JPL
833883	2010 LC_{125}	—	June 15, 2010	WISE	WISE	LIX	2.3 km	MPC · JPL
833884	2010 LV_{125}	—	June 15, 2010	WISE	WISE	·	1.8 km	MPC · JPL
833885	2010 LJ_{126}	—	June 15, 2010	WISE	WISE	LIX	3.1 km	MPC · JPL
833886	2010 LK_{126}	—	June 15, 2010	WISE	WISE	·	1.4 km	MPC · JPL
833887	2010 LL_{126}	—	February 14, 2007	Mauna Kea	P. A. Wiegert	EMA	3.2 km	MPC · JPL
833888	2010 LH_{127}	—	June 15, 2010	WISE	WISE	EUP	3.1 km	MPC · JPL
833889	2010 LS_{128}	—	June 15, 2010	WISE	WISE	·	1.4 km	MPC · JPL
833890	2010 LV_{128}	—	June 15, 2010	WISE	WISE	·	3.3 km	MPC · JPL
833891	2010 LB_{129}	—	June 15, 2010	WISE	WISE	·	1.6 km	MPC · JPL
833892	2010 LC_{129}	—	June 15, 2010	WISE	WISE	·	2.8 km	MPC · JPL
833893	2010 LG_{130}	—	June 15, 2010	WISE	WISE	(895)	3.1 km	MPC · JPL
833894	2010 LK_{130}	—	June 15, 2010	WISE	WISE	·	3.0 km	MPC · JPL
833895	2010 LS_{130}	—	June 15, 2010	WISE	WISE	·	1.1 km	MPC · JPL
833896	2010 LC_{131}	—	March 25, 2010	Kitt Peak	Spacewatch	·	2.4 km	MPC · JPL
833897	2010 LQ_{131}	—	June 15, 2010	WISE	WISE	·	1.1 km	MPC · JPL
833898	2010 LS_{131}	—	November 26, 2006	Cloudcroft	W. K. Y. Yeung	·	1.6 km	MPC · JPL
833899	2010 LA_{132}	—	June 15, 2010	WISE	WISE	·	2.0 km	MPC · JPL
833900	2010 LU_{132}	—	June 15, 2010	WISE	WISE	·	2.0 km	MPC · JPL

== 833901–834000 ==
back to top

Designation			Discovery			Properties		Ref
Permanent	Provisional	Named after	Date	Site	Discoverer(s)	Category	Diam.	Ref
833901	2010 LD_{133}	—	June 15, 2010	WISE	WISE	·	1.6 km	MPC · JPL
833902	2010 LN_{146}	—	May 10, 2014	Haleakala	Pan-STARRS 1	·	1.6 km	MPC · JPL
833903	2010 LO_{159}	—	August 16, 2010	La Sagra	OAM	·	1.0 km	MPC · JPL
833904	2010 LT_{159}	—	June 11, 2010	Mount Lemmon	Mount Lemmon Survey	·	490 m	MPC · JPL
833905	2010 ME_{2}	—	June 22, 2010	Mount Lemmon	Mount Lemmon Survey	·	3.8 km	MPC · JPL
833906	2010 MQ_{2}	—	June 20, 2010	Kitt Peak	Spacewatch	·	2.1 km	MPC · JPL
833907	2010 MT_{3}	—	June 18, 2010	Mount Lemmon	Mount Lemmon Survey	critical	590 m	MPC · JPL
833908	2010 MP_{5}	—	June 21, 2010	WISE	WISE	·	3.0 km	MPC · JPL
833909	2010 MX_{5}	—	June 22, 2010	WISE	WISE	T_{j} (2.94)	3.2 km	MPC · JPL
833910	2010 MH_{6}	—	June 16, 2010	WISE	WISE	T_{j} (2.98)	4.2 km	MPC · JPL
833911	2010 ML_{7}	—	June 16, 2010	WISE	WISE	·	1.6 km	MPC · JPL
833912	2010 MV_{7}	—	June 4, 2005	Kitt Peak	Spacewatch	·	1.2 km	MPC · JPL
833913	2010 MW_{8}	—	June 16, 2010	WISE	WISE	·	3.3 km	MPC · JPL
833914	2010 MJ_{9}	—	June 16, 2010	WISE	WISE	·	1.1 km	MPC · JPL
833915	2010 MU_{9}	—	June 16, 2010	WISE	WISE	·	3.2 km	MPC · JPL
833916	2010 MX_{11}	—	June 17, 2010	WISE	WISE	·	2.5 km	MPC · JPL
833917	2010 MZ_{11}	—	June 17, 2010	WISE	WISE	·	3.5 km	MPC · JPL
833918	2010 MH_{12}	—	June 17, 2010	WISE	WISE	·	2.5 km	MPC · JPL
833919	2010 MQ_{13}	—	June 17, 2010	WISE	WISE	·	2.9 km	MPC · JPL
833920	2010 MT_{13}	—	June 17, 2010	WISE	WISE	·	2.5 km	MPC · JPL
833921	2010 MK_{14}	—	June 17, 2010	WISE	WISE	·	1.4 km	MPC · JPL
833922	2010 ML_{14}	—	June 17, 2010	WISE	WISE	·	1.4 km	MPC · JPL
833923	2010 MS_{14}	—	June 17, 2010	WISE	WISE	LIX	2.4 km	MPC · JPL
833924	2010 MZ_{14}	—	June 17, 2010	WISE	WISE	·	2.0 km	MPC · JPL
833925	2010 MB_{15}	—	June 17, 2010	WISE	WISE	·	1.9 km	MPC · JPL
833926	2010 MC_{15}	—	June 17, 2010	WISE	WISE	·	2.8 km	MPC · JPL
833927	2010 MW_{15}	—	October 5, 1999	Socorro	LINEAR	·	2.8 km	MPC · JPL
833928	2010 MF_{16}	—	June 17, 2010	WISE	WISE	HOF	2.2 km	MPC · JPL
833929	2010 MN_{17}	—	June 17, 2010	WISE	WISE	MIS	1.9 km	MPC · JPL
833930	2010 MP_{18}	—	June 17, 2010	WISE	WISE	·	1.8 km	MPC · JPL
833931	2010 MU_{18}	—	June 17, 2010	WISE	WISE	·	2.8 km	MPC · JPL
833932	2010 MA_{19}	—	June 17, 2010	WISE	WISE	·	3.7 km	MPC · JPL
833933	2010 MV_{19}	—	June 18, 2010	WISE	WISE	TIN	910 m	MPC · JPL
833934	2010 MY_{19}	—	June 18, 2010	WISE	WISE	·	2.4 km	MPC · JPL
833935	2010 MP_{20}	—	June 18, 2010	WISE	WISE	PHO	2.1 km	MPC · JPL
833936	2010 MO_{21}	—	February 9, 2010	Siding Spring	SSS	·	2.3 km	MPC · JPL
833937	2010 MW_{21}	—	June 18, 2010	WISE	WISE	·	1.8 km	MPC · JPL
833938	2010 MA_{22}	—	June 18, 2010	WISE	WISE	·	2.8 km	MPC · JPL
833939	2010 MU_{22}	—	October 20, 2006	Mount Lemmon	Mount Lemmon Survey	·	1.5 km	MPC · JPL
833940	2010 MW_{22}	—	June 18, 2010	WISE	WISE	·	2.4 km	MPC · JPL
833941	2010 MZ_{22}	—	June 18, 2010	WISE	WISE	·	3.1 km	MPC · JPL
833942	2010 ME_{24}	—	June 18, 2010	WISE	WISE	·	1.4 km	MPC · JPL
833943	2010 MF_{24}	—	June 18, 2010	WISE	WISE	·	1.8 km	MPC · JPL
833944	2010 ML_{24}	—	June 18, 2010	WISE	WISE	·	2.5 km	MPC · JPL
833945	2010 MX_{24}	—	June 18, 2010	WISE	WISE	·	2.9 km	MPC · JPL
833946	2010 MW_{26}	—	June 19, 2010	WISE	WISE	DOR	2.0 km	MPC · JPL
833947	2010 MB_{28}	—	June 19, 2010	WISE	WISE	URS	2.3 km	MPC · JPL
833948	2010 ME_{29}	—	June 21, 2010	Kitt Peak	Spacewatch	EUP	3.7 km	MPC · JPL
833949	2010 MP_{29}	—	June 19, 2010	WISE	WISE	·	3.0 km	MPC · JPL
833950	2010 MT_{29}	—	June 20, 2010	WISE	WISE	·	1.5 km	MPC · JPL
833951	2010 MW_{29}	—	October 13, 1999	Sacramento Peak	SDSS	·	2.6 km	MPC · JPL
833952	2010 MH_{30}	—	June 20, 2010	WISE	WISE	LUT	2.4 km	MPC · JPL
833953	2010 MW_{30}	—	June 20, 2010	WISE	WISE	·	2.3 km	MPC · JPL
833954	2010 ME_{31}	—	June 20, 2010	WISE	WISE	·	3.3 km	MPC · JPL
833955	2010 MM_{31}	—	March 29, 2008	Mount Lemmon	Mount Lemmon Survey	·	3.5 km	MPC · JPL
833956	2010 MP_{31}	—	June 20, 2010	WISE	WISE	EUP	2.4 km	MPC · JPL
833957	2010 MY_{31}	—	June 20, 2010	WISE	WISE	PHO	2.4 km	MPC · JPL
833958	2010 MP_{32}	—	June 20, 2010	WISE	WISE	·	2.0 km	MPC · JPL
833959	2010 MB_{33}	—	June 20, 2010	WISE	WISE	·	2.7 km	MPC · JPL
833960	2010 MG_{33}	—	June 20, 2010	WISE	WISE	LIX	2.4 km	MPC · JPL
833961	2010 MX_{33}	—	June 21, 2010	WISE	WISE	T_{j} (2.98) · EUP	3.0 km	MPC · JPL
833962	2010 MB_{35}	—	June 18, 2010	WISE	WISE	THB	2.3 km	MPC · JPL
833963	2010 MC_{35}	—	June 21, 2010	WISE	WISE	·	3.6 km	MPC · JPL
833964	2010 ME_{35}	—	June 21, 2010	WISE	WISE	·	2.7 km	MPC · JPL
833965	2010 MU_{35}	—	May 16, 2010	Kitt Peak	Spacewatch	TRE	2.3 km	MPC · JPL
833966	2010 MZ_{35}	—	June 21, 2010	WISE	WISE	·	2.2 km	MPC · JPL
833967	2010 MJ_{36}	—	June 21, 2010	WISE	WISE	·	1.1 km	MPC · JPL
833968	2010 MX_{36}	—	June 21, 2010	WISE	WISE	·	2.6 km	MPC · JPL
833969	2010 MS_{37}	—	June 21, 2010	WISE	WISE	·	2.4 km	MPC · JPL
833970	2010 MP_{38}	—	June 21, 2010	WISE	WISE	·	1.8 km	MPC · JPL
833971	2010 MS_{39}	—	March 12, 2007	Mount Lemmon	Mount Lemmon Survey	LIX	2.9 km	MPC · JPL
833972	2010 MZ_{39}	—	June 22, 2010	WISE	WISE	LUT	4.4 km	MPC · JPL
833973	2010 MA_{40}	—	June 22, 2010	WISE	WISE	·	2.6 km	MPC · JPL
833974	2010 MC_{40}	—	June 22, 2010	WISE	WISE	·	1.6 km	MPC · JPL
833975	2010 MT_{40}	—	June 22, 2010	WISE	WISE	NAE	2.1 km	MPC · JPL
833976	2010 MV_{40}	—	June 22, 2010	WISE	WISE	·	2.0 km	MPC · JPL
833977	2010 ML_{41}	—	March 20, 1999	Sacramento Peak	SDSS	·	3.4 km	MPC · JPL
833978	2010 MV_{41}	—	June 22, 2010	WISE	WISE	·	3.1 km	MPC · JPL
833979	2010 MY_{41}	—	June 22, 2010	WISE	WISE	EMA	2.2 km	MPC · JPL
833980	2010 MA_{42}	—	June 22, 2010	WISE	WISE	THB	2.7 km	MPC · JPL
833981	2010 MH_{42}	—	June 22, 2010	WISE	WISE	T_{j} (2.97)	3.3 km	MPC · JPL
833982	2010 MN_{42}	—	November 6, 2008	Mount Lemmon	Mount Lemmon Survey	THB	2.4 km	MPC · JPL
833983	2010 MT_{42}	—	June 22, 2010	WISE	WISE	THB	2.1 km	MPC · JPL
833984	2010 MV_{42}	—	March 19, 2010	Zelenchukskaya	T. V. Krjačko, B. Satovski	·	1.6 km	MPC · JPL
833985	2010 MT_{43}	—	June 22, 2010	WISE	WISE	PHO	2.1 km	MPC · JPL
833986	2010 MN_{44}	—	October 28, 2005	Mount Lemmon	Mount Lemmon Survey	(1118)	2.5 km	MPC · JPL
833987	2010 MB_{45}	—	June 22, 2010	WISE	WISE	T_{j} (2.99) · EUP	2.9 km	MPC · JPL
833988	2010 MK_{45}	—	June 22, 2010	WISE	WISE	·	3.8 km	MPC · JPL
833989	2010 ML_{46}	—	October 2, 2006	Mount Lemmon	Mount Lemmon Survey	·	1.7 km	MPC · JPL
833990	2010 MJ_{47}	—	June 23, 2010	WISE	WISE	·	3.6 km	MPC · JPL
833991	2010 ML_{47}	—	June 23, 2010	WISE	WISE	·	2.9 km	MPC · JPL
833992	2010 MT_{47}	—	June 23, 2010	WISE	WISE	·	5.4 km	MPC · JPL
833993	2010 ME_{48}	—	June 23, 2010	WISE	WISE	·	2.5 km	MPC · JPL
833994	2010 MB_{50}	—	June 23, 2010	WISE	WISE	·	3.1 km	MPC · JPL
833995	2010 MD_{50}	—	June 23, 2010	WISE	WISE	THB	2.5 km	MPC · JPL
833996	2010 MX_{50}	—	June 23, 2010	WISE	WISE	·	1.5 km	MPC · JPL
833997	2010 MD_{51}	—	June 23, 2010	WISE	WISE	·	2.4 km	MPC · JPL
833998	2010 MJ_{51}	—	October 20, 2008	Mount Lemmon	Mount Lemmon Survey	·	1.5 km	MPC · JPL
833999	2010 ML_{51}	—	March 12, 2010	Kitt Peak	Spacewatch	·	1.5 km	MPC · JPL
834000	2010 MM_{52}	—	May 14, 2005	Kitt Peak	Spacewatch	T_{j} (2.94)	5.1 km	MPC · JPL

back to top

== Meaning of names ==
As minor planet discoveries are confirmed, they are given a permanent number by the IAU's Minor Planet Center (MPC), and the discoverers can then submit names for them, following the IAU's naming conventions. The list below concerns those minor planets in the specified number-range that have received names, and explains the meanings of those names.

Official naming citations of newly named small Solar System bodies are approved and published in a bulletin by IAU's Working Group for Small Bodies Nomenclature (WGSBN). Before May 2021, citations were published in MPC's Minor Planet Circulars for many decades. Recent citations can also be found on the JPL Small-Body Database (SBDB). Until his death in 2016, German astronomer Lutz D. Schmadel compiled these citations into the Dictionary of Minor Planet Names (DMP) and regularly updated the collection.

Based on Paul Herget's The Names of the Minor Planets, Schmadel also researched the unclear origin of numerous asteroids, most of which had been named prior to World War II. This article incorporates text from this source, which is in the public domain: SBDB New namings may only be added to this list below after official publication as the preannouncement of names is condemned. The WGSBN publishes a comprehensive guideline for the naming rules of non-cometary small Solar System bodies.

Named minor planet	Provisional	This minor planet was named for...	Ref · Catalog
833362 Nida	2010 JN_{76}	Nida, a small resort town in Lithuania, located on the Curonian Spit between the Curonian Lagoon and the Baltic Sea.	IAU · 833362
