= List of minor planets: 779001–780000 =

The following is a partial list of minor planets, running from minor-planet number 779001 through 780000, inclusive. The primary data for this and other partial lists is based on JPL's "Small-Body Orbital Elements" and data available from the Minor Planet Center. Critical list information is also provided by the MPC, unless otherwise specified from Lowell Observatory. A detailed description of the table's columns and additional sources are given on the main page including a complete list of every page in this series, and a statistical break-up on the dynamical classification of minor planets.

Also see the summary list of all named bodies in numerical and alphabetical order, and the corresponding naming citations for the number range of this particular list. New namings may only be added to this list after official publication, as the preannouncement of names is condemned by the Working Group for Small Bodies Nomenclature of the International Astronomical Union.

Near-Earth obj.	MBA (inner)	MBA (outer)	Centaur
Mars-crosser	MBA (middle)	Jupiter trojan	Trans-Neptunian obj.
Unclassified

== 779001–779100 ==
Designation			Discovery			Properties		Ref
Permanent	Provisional	Named after	Date	Site	Discoverer(s)	Category	Diam.	Ref
779001	2011 CV_{79}	—	February 5, 2011	Haleakala	Pan-STARRS 1	·	1.4 km	MPC · JPL
779002	2011 CW_{81}	—	February 5, 2011	Haleakala	Pan-STARRS 1	·	1.8 km	MPC · JPL
779003	2011 CC_{82}	—	February 5, 2011	Haleakala	Pan-STARRS 1	·	1.7 km	MPC · JPL
779004	2011 CZ_{96}	—	February 5, 2011	Haleakala	Pan-STARRS 1	·	1.2 km	MPC · JPL
779005	2011 CV_{100}	—	February 5, 2011	Haleakala	Pan-STARRS 1	·	880 m	MPC · JPL
779006	2011 CP_{102}	—	February 5, 2011	Haleakala	Pan-STARRS 1	·	1.3 km	MPC · JPL
779007	2011 CB_{103}	—	February 5, 2011	Haleakala	Pan-STARRS 1	·	780 m	MPC · JPL
779008	2011 CA_{105}	—	February 5, 2011	Haleakala	Pan-STARRS 1	3:2	3.6 km	MPC · JPL
779009	2011 CA_{112}	—	January 27, 2011	Kitt Peak	Spacewatch	·	2.2 km	MPC · JPL
779010	2011 CL_{116}	—	February 25, 2011	Kitt Peak	Spacewatch	·	1.3 km	MPC · JPL
779011	2011 CK_{119}	—	April 1, 2016	Mount Lemmon	Mount Lemmon Survey	DOR	1.6 km	MPC · JPL
779012	2011 CT_{120}	—	February 10, 2011	Mount Lemmon	Mount Lemmon Survey	·	1.4 km	MPC · JPL
779013	2011 CG_{121}	—	February 10, 2011	Mount Lemmon	Mount Lemmon Survey	·	1.7 km	MPC · JPL
779014	2011 CP_{125}	—	April 2, 2011	Haleakala	Pan-STARRS 1	·	1.7 km	MPC · JPL
779015	2011 CS_{125}	—	February 10, 2011	Mount Lemmon	Mount Lemmon Survey	·	2.4 km	MPC · JPL
779016	2011 CX_{125}	—	February 25, 2011	Mount Lemmon	Mount Lemmon Survey	·	2.0 km	MPC · JPL
779017	2011 CF_{126}	—	February 10, 2011	Mount Lemmon	Mount Lemmon Survey	PHO	770 m	MPC · JPL
779018	2011 CR_{126}	—	September 19, 2014	Haleakala	Pan-STARRS 1	VER	1.7 km	MPC · JPL
779019	2011 CR_{127}	—	March 31, 2012	Mount Lemmon	Mount Lemmon Survey	EOS	1.3 km	MPC · JPL
779020	2011 CV_{127}	—	February 10, 2011	Mount Lemmon	Mount Lemmon Survey	·	1.3 km	MPC · JPL
779021	2011 CR_{129}	—	February 9, 2011	Mount Lemmon	Mount Lemmon Survey	·	820 m	MPC · JPL
779022	2011 CA_{131}	—	February 7, 2011	Mount Lemmon	Mount Lemmon Survey	WIT	720 m	MPC · JPL
779023	2011 CF_{131}	—	February 7, 2011	Mount Lemmon	Mount Lemmon Survey	AGN	940 m	MPC · JPL
779024	2011 CJ_{131}	—	February 5, 2011	Mount Lemmon	Mount Lemmon Survey	·	1.3 km	MPC · JPL
779025	2011 CN_{132}	—	February 11, 2011	Mount Lemmon	Mount Lemmon Survey	·	1.2 km	MPC · JPL
779026	2011 CO_{132}	—	February 8, 2011	Mount Lemmon	Mount Lemmon Survey	·	970 m	MPC · JPL
779027	2011 CJ_{136}	—	February 13, 2011	Mount Lemmon	Mount Lemmon Survey	·	1.3 km	MPC · JPL
779028	2011 CT_{137}	—	February 5, 2011	Haleakala	Pan-STARRS 1	·	1.4 km	MPC · JPL
779029	2011 CD_{138}	—	February 11, 2011	Mount Lemmon	Mount Lemmon Survey	·	1.3 km	MPC · JPL
779030	2011 CK_{138}	—	February 5, 2011	Haleakala	Pan-STARRS 1	·	1.6 km	MPC · JPL
779031	2011 CR_{138}	—	February 10, 2011	Mount Lemmon	Mount Lemmon Survey	AGN	870 m	MPC · JPL
779032	2011 CT_{138}	—	February 7, 2011	Mount Lemmon	Mount Lemmon Survey	·	1.5 km	MPC · JPL
779033	2011 CC_{139}	—	February 12, 2011	Mount Lemmon	Mount Lemmon Survey	EOS	1.4 km	MPC · JPL
779034	2011 CK_{139}	—	February 10, 2011	Mount Lemmon	Mount Lemmon Survey	AGN	840 m	MPC · JPL
779035	2011 CS_{139}	—	February 5, 2011	Haleakala	Pan-STARRS 1	PAD	1.0 km	MPC · JPL
779036	2011 CZ_{139}	—	February 10, 2011	Mount Lemmon	Mount Lemmon Survey	·	1.5 km	MPC · JPL
779037	2011 CZ_{140}	—	February 7, 2011	Mount Lemmon	Mount Lemmon Survey	·	930 m	MPC · JPL
779038	2011 CB_{141}	—	February 10, 2011	Mount Lemmon	Mount Lemmon Survey	·	630 m	MPC · JPL
779039	2011 CD_{144}	—	February 5, 2011	Catalina	CSS	·	2.4 km	MPC · JPL
779040	2011 CA_{145}	—	February 10, 2011	Mount Lemmon	Mount Lemmon Survey	HOF	1.6 km	MPC · JPL
779041	2011 CM_{146}	—	February 12, 2011	Mount Lemmon	Mount Lemmon Survey	·	2.2 km	MPC · JPL
779042	2011 CY_{146}	—	February 10, 2011	Mount Lemmon	Mount Lemmon Survey	THM	1.8 km	MPC · JPL
779043	2011 CQ_{147}	—	February 7, 2011	Mount Lemmon	Mount Lemmon Survey	·	1.3 km	MPC · JPL
779044	2011 CT_{147}	—	February 10, 2011	Mount Lemmon	Mount Lemmon Survey	·	1.4 km	MPC · JPL
779045	2011 CJ_{148}	—	February 10, 2011	Mount Lemmon	Mount Lemmon Survey	PAD	1.2 km	MPC · JPL
779046	2011 CP_{148}	—	February 13, 2011	Mount Lemmon	Mount Lemmon Survey	·	1.3 km	MPC · JPL
779047	2011 CQ_{148}	—	February 8, 2011	Mount Lemmon	Mount Lemmon Survey	·	1.1 km	MPC · JPL
779048	2011 CW_{148}	—	February 7, 2011	Mount Lemmon	Mount Lemmon Survey	·	1.2 km	MPC · JPL
779049	2011 CM_{149}	—	February 7, 2011	Mount Lemmon	Mount Lemmon Survey	·	1.2 km	MPC · JPL
779050	2011 CU_{149}	—	February 11, 2011	Mount Lemmon	Mount Lemmon Survey	·	1.2 km	MPC · JPL
779051	2011 CA_{150}	—	February 7, 2011	Mount Lemmon	Mount Lemmon Survey	·	1.4 km	MPC · JPL
779052	2011 CM_{151}	—	February 7, 2011	Mount Lemmon	Mount Lemmon Survey	·	1.5 km	MPC · JPL
779053	2011 CX_{151}	—	February 5, 2011	Haleakala	Pan-STARRS 1	·	1.4 km	MPC · JPL
779054	2011 CJ_{152}	—	February 5, 2011	Haleakala	Pan-STARRS 1	KOR	1.1 km	MPC · JPL
779055	2011 CL_{152}	—	February 13, 2011	Mount Lemmon	Mount Lemmon Survey	KOR	880 m	MPC · JPL
779056	2011 CN_{152}	—	February 8, 2011	Mount Lemmon	Mount Lemmon Survey	WIT	660 m	MPC · JPL
779057	2011 CO_{152}	—	February 8, 2011	Mount Lemmon	Mount Lemmon Survey	·	1.7 km	MPC · JPL
779058	2011 CK_{153}	—	February 10, 2011	Mount Lemmon	Mount Lemmon Survey	·	1.2 km	MPC · JPL
779059	2011 CT_{153}	—	February 11, 2011	Mount Lemmon	Mount Lemmon Survey	·	1.1 km	MPC · JPL
779060	2011 CE_{155}	—	February 8, 2011	Mount Lemmon	Mount Lemmon Survey	·	1.4 km	MPC · JPL
779061	2011 DA_{7}	—	February 25, 2011	Mount Lemmon	Mount Lemmon Survey	·	1.2 km	MPC · JPL
779062	2011 DA_{14}	—	February 25, 2011	Mount Lemmon	Mount Lemmon Survey	·	1.2 km	MPC · JPL
779063	2011 DZ_{16}	—	February 25, 2011	Mount Lemmon	Mount Lemmon Survey	·	1.3 km	MPC · JPL
779064	2011 DY_{17}	—	February 26, 2011	Mount Lemmon	Mount Lemmon Survey	EOS	1.3 km	MPC · JPL
779065	2011 DV_{22}	—	February 26, 2011	Kitt Peak	Spacewatch	·	1.4 km	MPC · JPL
779066	2011 DE_{24}	—	February 26, 2011	Kitt Peak	Spacewatch	·	2.1 km	MPC · JPL
779067	2011 DF_{27}	—	January 15, 2011	Mount Lemmon	Mount Lemmon Survey	DOR	1.7 km	MPC · JPL
779068	2011 DW_{29}	—	February 10, 2011	Mount Lemmon	Mount Lemmon Survey	·	1.3 km	MPC · JPL
779069	2011 DW_{33}	—	February 25, 2011	Mount Lemmon	Mount Lemmon Survey	·	1.2 km	MPC · JPL
779070	2011 DQ_{35}	—	February 6, 2002	Kitt Peak	Deep Ecliptic Survey	·	1.2 km	MPC · JPL
779071	2011 DF_{37}	—	January 23, 2006	Mount Lemmon	Mount Lemmon Survey	·	1.4 km	MPC · JPL
779072	2011 DD_{41}	—	February 25, 2011	Mount Lemmon	Mount Lemmon Survey	GAL	1.2 km	MPC · JPL
779073	2011 DZ_{46}	—	February 26, 2011	Mount Lemmon	Mount Lemmon Survey	EOS	1.4 km	MPC · JPL
779074	2011 DA_{54}	—	February 3, 2016	Mount Lemmon	Mount Lemmon Survey	·	2.3 km	MPC · JPL
779075	2011 DU_{55}	—	November 26, 2014	Mount Lemmon	Mount Lemmon Survey	·	1.3 km	MPC · JPL
779076	2011 DO_{56}	—	February 25, 2011	Mount Lemmon	Mount Lemmon Survey	·	1.3 km	MPC · JPL
779077	2011 DP_{56}	—	February 25, 2011	Kitt Peak	Spacewatch	THM	1.8 km	MPC · JPL
779078	2011 DA_{58}	—	February 25, 2011	Mount Lemmon	Mount Lemmon Survey	MRX	630 m	MPC · JPL
779079	2011 DE_{58}	—	February 25, 2011	Mount Lemmon	Mount Lemmon Survey	·	1.3 km	MPC · JPL
779080	2011 DB_{60}	—	February 26, 2011	Mount Lemmon	Mount Lemmon Survey	·	2.9 km	MPC · JPL
779081	2011 DF_{60}	—	February 25, 2011	Mount Lemmon	Mount Lemmon Survey	HYG	1.8 km	MPC · JPL
779082	2011 DR_{61}	—	February 25, 2011	Mount Lemmon	Mount Lemmon Survey	·	1.5 km	MPC · JPL
779083	2011 EH_{2}	—	February 8, 2011	Mount Lemmon	Mount Lemmon Survey	·	1.2 km	MPC · JPL
779084	2011 EE_{9}	—	March 2, 2011	Kitt Peak	Spacewatch	·	1.4 km	MPC · JPL
779085	2011 EX_{14}	—	April 29, 2006	Kitt Peak	Spacewatch	LIX	2.7 km	MPC · JPL
779086	2011 EP_{17}	—	March 6, 2011	Piszkés-tető	K. Sárneczky, J. Kelemen	·	1.7 km	MPC · JPL
779087	2011 EB_{41}	—	March 10, 2011	Catalina	CSS	·	970 m	MPC · JPL
779088	2011 EG_{46}	—	March 2, 2011	Kitt Peak	Spacewatch	·	1.6 km	MPC · JPL
779089	2011 ET_{56}	—	March 12, 2011	Mount Lemmon	Mount Lemmon Survey	·	1.6 km	MPC · JPL
779090	2011 EW_{58}	—	March 12, 2011	Mount Lemmon	Mount Lemmon Survey	·	1.8 km	MPC · JPL
779091	2011 EE_{60}	—	March 12, 2011	Mount Lemmon	Mount Lemmon Survey	·	2.2 km	MPC · JPL
779092	2011 ED_{61}	—	March 12, 2011	Mount Lemmon	Mount Lemmon Survey	EOS	1.2 km	MPC · JPL
779093	2011 EK_{64}	—	March 9, 2011	Mount Lemmon	Mount Lemmon Survey	·	1.2 km	MPC · JPL
779094	2011 EH_{65}	—	March 22, 2001	Kitt Peak	Spacewatch	·	1.5 km	MPC · JPL
779095	2011 EH_{86}	—	March 2, 2011	Catalina	CSS	·	2.3 km	MPC · JPL
779096	2011 EV_{87}	—	January 4, 2016	Haleakala	Pan-STARRS 1	·	2.2 km	MPC · JPL
779097	2011 EY_{88}	—	February 10, 2011	Mount Lemmon	Mount Lemmon Survey	·	1.2 km	MPC · JPL
779098	2011 EW_{93}	—	April 1, 2016	Haleakala	Pan-STARRS 1	·	1.5 km	MPC · JPL
779099	2011 EL_{94}	—	March 10, 2011	Catalina	CSS	T_{j} (2.99) · EUP	2.5 km	MPC · JPL
779100	2011 EA_{100}	—	March 9, 2011	Mount Lemmon	Mount Lemmon Survey	EOS	1.4 km	MPC · JPL

== 779101–779200 ==
back to top

Designation			Discovery			Properties		Ref
Permanent	Provisional	Named after	Date	Site	Discoverer(s)	Category	Diam.	Ref
779101	2011 EF_{100}	—	March 14, 2011	Mount Lemmon	Mount Lemmon Survey	HOF	2.0 km	MPC · JPL
779102	2011 EH_{100}	—	March 13, 2011	Mount Lemmon	Mount Lemmon Survey	·	1.6 km	MPC · JPL
779103	2011 ED_{101}	—	March 14, 2011	Mount Lemmon	Mount Lemmon Survey	DOR	1.7 km	MPC · JPL
779104	2011 EK_{101}	—	March 11, 2011	Kitt Peak	Spacewatch	·	1.5 km	MPC · JPL
779105	2011 EP_{101}	—	March 6, 2011	Mount Lemmon	Mount Lemmon Survey	·	1.1 km	MPC · JPL
779106	2011 EU_{101}	—	March 13, 2011	Kitt Peak	Spacewatch	·	1.6 km	MPC · JPL
779107	2011 EF_{102}	—	March 2, 2011	Kitt Peak	Spacewatch	·	1.2 km	MPC · JPL
779108	2011 EK_{102}	—	March 12, 2011	Mount Lemmon	Mount Lemmon Survey	EOS	1.3 km	MPC · JPL
779109	2011 EK_{106}	—	March 2, 2011	Mount Lemmon	Mount Lemmon Survey	·	2.5 km	MPC · JPL
779110	2011 ER_{106}	—	March 9, 2011	Mount Lemmon	Mount Lemmon Survey	·	2.2 km	MPC · JPL
779111	2011 EF_{107}	—	March 4, 2011	Kitt Peak	Spacewatch	KOR	1.2 km	MPC · JPL
779112	2011 ER_{107}	—	March 4, 2011	Mount Lemmon	Mount Lemmon Survey	·	1.4 km	MPC · JPL
779113	2011 EH_{111}	—	March 2, 2011	Kitt Peak	Spacewatch	VER	2.3 km	MPC · JPL
779114	2011 EZ_{111}	—	March 4, 2011	Mount Lemmon	Mount Lemmon Survey	·	1.3 km	MPC · JPL
779115	2011 EA_{112}	—	March 14, 2011	Mount Lemmon	Mount Lemmon Survey	·	1.4 km	MPC · JPL
779116	2011 EJ_{112}	—	March 4, 2011	Mount Lemmon	Mount Lemmon Survey	KOR	1.0 km	MPC · JPL
779117	2011 EA_{114}	—	March 14, 2011	Mount Lemmon	Mount Lemmon Survey	·	1.2 km	MPC · JPL
779118	2011 EK_{115}	—	March 2, 2011	Mount Lemmon	Mount Lemmon Survey	·	1.4 km	MPC · JPL
779119	2011 FH	—	January 9, 2011	Mount Lemmon	Mount Lemmon Survey	H	510 m	MPC · JPL
779120	2011 FW_{5}	—	March 26, 2011	Mount Lemmon	Mount Lemmon Survey	·	1.5 km	MPC · JPL
779121	2011 FX_{14}	—	March 28, 2011	Mount Lemmon	Mount Lemmon Survey	·	1.1 km	MPC · JPL
779122	2011 FP_{16}	—	April 2, 2006	Mount Lemmon	Mount Lemmon Survey	·	1.3 km	MPC · JPL
779123	2011 FS_{40}	—	March 31, 2011	Mayhill-ISON	L. Elenin	·	1.4 km	MPC · JPL
779124	2011 FC_{47}	—	March 29, 2011	Kitt Peak	Spacewatch	·	920 m	MPC · JPL
779125	2011 FV_{52}	—	March 28, 2011	Mount Lemmon	Mount Lemmon Survey	·	1.4 km	MPC · JPL
779126	2011 FM_{60}	—	February 25, 2011	Mount Lemmon	Mount Lemmon Survey	·	1.8 km	MPC · JPL
779127	2011 FU_{63}	—	March 30, 2011	Mount Lemmon	Mount Lemmon Survey	·	2.0 km	MPC · JPL
779128	2011 FM_{64}	—	November 17, 2009	Mount Lemmon	Mount Lemmon Survey	·	1.4 km	MPC · JPL
779129	2011 FX_{64}	—	March 30, 2011	Mount Lemmon	Mount Lemmon Survey	·	2.2 km	MPC · JPL
779130	2011 FA_{73}	—	March 27, 2011	Mount Lemmon	Mount Lemmon Survey	·	1.2 km	MPC · JPL
779131	2011 FM_{73}	—	February 25, 2011	Mount Lemmon	Mount Lemmon Survey	MRX	730 m	MPC · JPL
779132	2011 FT_{75}	—	March 1, 2011	Mount Lemmon	Mount Lemmon Survey	AGN	870 m	MPC · JPL
779133	2011 FH_{77}	—	March 1, 2011	Mount Lemmon	Mount Lemmon Survey	·	2.4 km	MPC · JPL
779134	2011 FA_{82}	—	August 20, 2023	Haleakala	Pan-STARRS 2	·	1.7 km	MPC · JPL
779135	2011 FE_{94}	—	March 29, 2011	Mount Lemmon	Mount Lemmon Survey	·	1.3 km	MPC · JPL
779136	2011 FJ_{94}	—	March 29, 2011	Mount Lemmon	Mount Lemmon Survey	·	1.9 km	MPC · JPL
779137	2011 FH_{95}	—	March 29, 2011	Mount Lemmon	Mount Lemmon Survey	·	1.3 km	MPC · JPL
779138	2011 FC_{100}	—	March 30, 2011	Mount Lemmon	Mount Lemmon Survey	HOF	1.9 km	MPC · JPL
779139	2011 FM_{101}	—	March 30, 2011	Mount Lemmon	Mount Lemmon Survey	·	2.2 km	MPC · JPL
779140	2011 FB_{102}	—	March 31, 2011	Haleakala	Pan-STARRS 1	EUN	880 m	MPC · JPL
779141	2011 FO_{105}	—	April 2, 2011	Haleakala	Pan-STARRS 1	HYG	2.0 km	MPC · JPL
779142	2011 FB_{106}	—	April 5, 2011	Mount Lemmon	Mount Lemmon Survey	·	940 m	MPC · JPL
779143	2011 FZ_{108}	—	September 21, 2008	Mount Lemmon	Mount Lemmon Survey	HOF	2.1 km	MPC · JPL
779144	2011 FF_{111}	—	April 1, 2011	Mount Lemmon	Mount Lemmon Survey	·	2.4 km	MPC · JPL
779145	2011 FZ_{113}	—	April 1, 2011	Mount Lemmon	Mount Lemmon Survey	·	2.2 km	MPC · JPL
779146	2011 FQ_{114}	—	April 2, 2011	Mount Lemmon	Mount Lemmon Survey	·	1.4 km	MPC · JPL
779147	2011 FC_{115}	—	October 10, 2008	Mount Lemmon	Mount Lemmon Survey	EOS	1.4 km	MPC · JPL
779148	2011 FM_{119}	—	April 1, 2011	Mount Lemmon	Mount Lemmon Survey	·	1.2 km	MPC · JPL
779149	2011 FW_{121}	—	April 5, 2011	Mount Lemmon	Mount Lemmon Survey	·	1.4 km	MPC · JPL
779150	2011 FD_{122}	—	April 5, 2011	Mount Lemmon	Mount Lemmon Survey	·	1.7 km	MPC · JPL
779151	2011 FO_{124}	—	April 1, 2011	Mount Lemmon	Mount Lemmon Survey	·	2.2 km	MPC · JPL
779152	2011 FY_{137}	—	March 29, 2011	Mount Lemmon	Mount Lemmon Survey	KOR	910 m	MPC · JPL
779153	2011 FT_{138}	—	March 10, 2011	XuYi	PMO NEO Survey Program	·	1.6 km	MPC · JPL
779154	2011 FL_{150}	—	March 26, 2011	Mount Lemmon	Mount Lemmon Survey	·	1.5 km	MPC · JPL
779155	2011 FE_{166}	—	July 24, 2017	Haleakala	Pan-STARRS 1	BRA	900 m	MPC · JPL
779156	2011 FS_{166}	—	January 12, 2016	Haleakala	Pan-STARRS 1	·	2.1 km	MPC · JPL
779157	2011 FT_{166}	—	January 7, 2016	Haleakala	Pan-STARRS 1	·	2.0 km	MPC · JPL
779158	2011 FY_{167}	—	March 26, 2011	Haleakala	Pan-STARRS 1	·	2.0 km	MPC · JPL
779159	2011 FB_{170}	—	March 28, 2011	Mount Lemmon	Mount Lemmon Survey	EOS	1.3 km	MPC · JPL
779160	2011 FT_{170}	—	March 28, 2011	Mount Lemmon	Mount Lemmon Survey	(5)	890 m	MPC · JPL
779161	2011 FU_{172}	—	March 30, 2011	Mount Lemmon	Mount Lemmon Survey	KOR	990 m	MPC · JPL
779162	2011 FY_{172}	—	February 5, 2016	Haleakala	Pan-STARRS 1	·	1.7 km	MPC · JPL
779163	2011 GL_{1}	—	March 11, 2011	Mount Lemmon	Mount Lemmon Survey	·	1.1 km	MPC · JPL
779164	2011 GA_{7}	—	March 14, 2011	Kitt Peak	Spacewatch	·	1.2 km	MPC · JPL
779165	2011 GY_{9}	—	April 1, 2011	Mount Lemmon	Mount Lemmon Survey	EOS	1.4 km	MPC · JPL
779166	2011 GU_{15}	—	April 1, 2011	Mount Lemmon	Mount Lemmon Survey	·	1.5 km	MPC · JPL
779167	2011 GG_{17}	—	April 1, 2011	Mount Lemmon	Mount Lemmon Survey	·	1.5 km	MPC · JPL
779168	2011 GN_{18}	—	April 2, 2011	Mount Lemmon	Mount Lemmon Survey	·	2.3 km	MPC · JPL
779169	2011 GR_{18}	—	September 21, 2003	Kitt Peak	Spacewatch	GAL	1.1 km	MPC · JPL
779170	2011 GJ_{20}	—	September 24, 2008	Mount Lemmon	Mount Lemmon Survey	·	1.3 km	MPC · JPL
779171	2011 GJ_{23}	—	April 4, 2011	Mount Lemmon	Mount Lemmon Survey	EOS	1.3 km	MPC · JPL
779172	2011 GY_{33}	—	April 3, 2011	Haleakala	Pan-STARRS 1	·	2.3 km	MPC · JPL
779173	2011 GC_{46}	—	April 4, 2011	Mount Lemmon	Mount Lemmon Survey	LIX	2.6 km	MPC · JPL
779174	2011 GT_{47}	—	April 3, 2011	Haleakala	Pan-STARRS 1	·	1.8 km	MPC · JPL
779175	2011 GW_{51}	—	April 5, 2011	Mount Lemmon	Mount Lemmon Survey	·	1.7 km	MPC · JPL
779176	2011 GX_{58}	—	April 1, 2011	Mount Lemmon	Mount Lemmon Survey	·	2.2 km	MPC · JPL
779177	2011 GH_{68}	—	April 2, 2011	Haleakala	Pan-STARRS 1	·	1.5 km	MPC · JPL
779178	2011 GC_{73}	—	April 2, 2011	Kitt Peak	Spacewatch	EOS	1.5 km	MPC · JPL
779179	2011 GU_{78}	—	April 13, 2011	Mount Lemmon	Mount Lemmon Survey	·	1.8 km	MPC · JPL
779180	2011 GU_{90}	—	April 2, 2011	Kitt Peak	Spacewatch	·	1.5 km	MPC · JPL
779181	2011 GT_{95}	—	September 1, 2013	Mount Lemmon	Mount Lemmon Survey	·	2.0 km	MPC · JPL
779182	2011 GH_{96}	—	September 1, 2013	Mount Lemmon	Mount Lemmon Survey	·	1.6 km	MPC · JPL
779183	2011 GD_{97}	—	September 14, 2013	Haleakala	Pan-STARRS 1	·	1.9 km	MPC · JPL
779184	2011 GM_{98}	—	April 15, 2016	Haleakala	Pan-STARRS 1	·	1.4 km	MPC · JPL
779185	2011 GJ_{99}	—	February 9, 2016	Haleakala	Pan-STARRS 1	·	2.2 km	MPC · JPL
779186	2011 GV_{99}	—	April 2, 2011	Mount Lemmon	Mount Lemmon Survey	·	1.4 km	MPC · JPL
779187	2011 GB_{102}	—	April 5, 2011	Mount Lemmon	Mount Lemmon Survey	THB	2.4 km	MPC · JPL
779188	2011 GC_{105}	—	April 2, 2011	Kitt Peak	Spacewatch	·	560 m	MPC · JPL
779189	2011 GK_{108}	—	April 11, 2011	Mount Lemmon	Mount Lemmon Survey	·	2.1 km	MPC · JPL
779190	2011 GO_{109}	—	April 3, 2011	Haleakala	Pan-STARRS 1	·	2.0 km	MPC · JPL
779191	2011 GC_{110}	—	April 12, 2011	Mount Lemmon	Mount Lemmon Survey	·	1.2 km	MPC · JPL
779192	2011 GZ_{110}	—	April 6, 2011	Mount Lemmon	Mount Lemmon Survey	·	2.2 km	MPC · JPL
779193	2011 GA_{111}	—	April 13, 2011	Kitt Peak	Spacewatch	·	710 m	MPC · JPL
779194	2011 HU_{15}	—	April 24, 2011	Mount Lemmon	Mount Lemmon Survey	·	1.3 km	MPC · JPL
779195	2011 HG_{22}	—	November 20, 2009	Kitt Peak	Spacewatch	·	1.4 km	MPC · JPL
779196	2011 HJ_{34}	—	April 24, 2011	Kitt Peak	Spacewatch	·	1.6 km	MPC · JPL
779197	2011 HU_{43}	—	April 27, 2011	Haleakala	Pan-STARRS 1	·	990 m	MPC · JPL
779198	2011 HP_{71}	—	April 26, 2011	Mount Lemmon	Mount Lemmon Survey	VER	2.2 km	MPC · JPL
779199	2011 HY_{87}	—	April 28, 2011	Mount Lemmon	Mount Lemmon Survey	THM	1.8 km	MPC · JPL
779200	2011 HY_{106}	—	April 30, 2011	Haleakala	Pan-STARRS 1	·	1.7 km	MPC · JPL

== 779201–779300 ==
back to top

Designation			Discovery			Properties		Ref
Permanent	Provisional	Named after	Date	Site	Discoverer(s)	Category	Diam.	Ref
779201	2011 HK_{109}	—	March 13, 2016	Haleakala	Pan-STARRS 1	·	2.1 km	MPC · JPL
779202	2011 HY_{110}	—	June 17, 2018	Haleakala	Pan-STARRS 1	EOS	1.4 km	MPC · JPL
779203	2011 HR_{111}	—	November 17, 2014	Haleakala	Pan-STARRS 1	·	1.8 km	MPC · JPL
779204	2011 HU_{111}	—	April 26, 2011	Mount Lemmon	Mount Lemmon Survey	·	1.5 km	MPC · JPL
779205	2011 HV_{113}	—	April 13, 2011	Mount Lemmon	Mount Lemmon Survey	·	2.2 km	MPC · JPL
779206	2011 JP_{4}	—	April 22, 2011	Kitt Peak	Spacewatch	·	2.3 km	MPC · JPL
779207	2011 JU_{5}	—	May 1, 2011	Haleakala	Pan-STARRS 1	·	1.6 km	MPC · JPL
779208	2011 JT_{14}	—	April 28, 2011	Kitt Peak	Spacewatch	·	2.0 km	MPC · JPL
779209	2011 JG_{18}	—	May 1, 2011	Haleakala	Pan-STARRS 1	·	2.2 km	MPC · JPL
779210	2011 JA_{22}	—	May 1, 2011	Haleakala	Pan-STARRS 1	·	2.4 km	MPC · JPL
779211	2011 JH_{34}	—	May 8, 2011	Mount Lemmon	Mount Lemmon Survey	·	2.5 km	MPC · JPL
779212	2011 JR_{35}	—	July 13, 2018	Haleakala	Pan-STARRS 1	·	2.6 km	MPC · JPL
779213	2011 JJ_{37}	—	May 12, 2011	Mount Lemmon	Mount Lemmon Survey	·	1.1 km	MPC · JPL
779214	2011 JJ_{38}	—	May 13, 2011	Mount Lemmon	Mount Lemmon Survey	·	1.3 km	MPC · JPL
779215	2011 JG_{39}	—	May 1, 2011	Haleakala	Pan-STARRS 1	·	2.0 km	MPC · JPL
779216	2011 KR_{14}	—	March 29, 2011	Kitt Peak	Spacewatch	THM	1.9 km	MPC · JPL
779217	2011 KK_{20}	—	May 3, 2011	Kitt Peak	Spacewatch	·	2.4 km	MPC · JPL
779218	2011 KK_{26}	—	May 21, 2011	Mount Lemmon	Mount Lemmon Survey	·	1.8 km	MPC · JPL
779219	2011 KU_{45}	—	May 29, 2011	Mount Lemmon	Mount Lemmon Survey	·	1.2 km	MPC · JPL
779220	2011 KL_{50}	—	February 17, 2015	Haleakala	Pan-STARRS 1	·	1.6 km	MPC · JPL
779221	2011 KO_{53}	—	May 28, 2011	Mount Lemmon	Mount Lemmon Survey	EOS	1.5 km	MPC · JPL
779222	2011 KT_{55}	—	May 24, 2011	Haleakala	Pan-STARRS 1	·	850 m	MPC · JPL
779223	2011 KQ_{57}	—	May 24, 2011	Mount Lemmon	Mount Lemmon Survey	·	2.5 km	MPC · JPL
779224	2011 LX_{8}	—	May 26, 2011	Kitt Peak	Spacewatch	·	1.6 km	MPC · JPL
779225	2011 LS_{11}	—	May 28, 2011	Mount Lemmon	Mount Lemmon Survey	·	2.1 km	MPC · JPL
779226	2011 LJ_{22}	—	May 24, 2011	Mount Lemmon	Mount Lemmon Survey	·	1.3 km	MPC · JPL
779227	2011 LK_{22}	—	May 27, 2011	Kitt Peak	Spacewatch	·	1.4 km	MPC · JPL
779228	2011 LM_{23}	—	June 5, 2011	Mount Lemmon	Mount Lemmon Survey	·	1.2 km	MPC · JPL
779229	2011 LX_{30}	—	March 31, 2016	Haleakala	Pan-STARRS 1	·	1.8 km	MPC · JPL
779230	2011 LH_{35}	—	June 5, 2011	Kitt Peak	Spacewatch	·	2.5 km	MPC · JPL
779231	2011 MH_{8}	—	June 24, 2011	Mount Lemmon	Mount Lemmon Survey	·	1.0 km	MPC · JPL
779232	2011 MH_{12}	—	June 26, 2011	Mount Lemmon	Mount Lemmon Survey	(895)	2.8 km	MPC · JPL
779233	2011 MZ_{13}	—	October 10, 2012	Mount Lemmon	Mount Lemmon Survey	·	1.7 km	MPC · JPL
779234	2011 MT_{14}	—	June 22, 2011	Mount Lemmon	Mount Lemmon Survey	·	1.6 km	MPC · JPL
779235	2011 ME_{15}	—	April 25, 2015	Haleakala	Pan-STARRS 1	·	1.2 km	MPC · JPL
779236	2011 ML_{16}	—	April 15, 2015	Kitt Peak	Research and Education Collaborative Occultation Network	·	1.5 km	MPC · JPL
779237	2011 NJ_{3}	—	June 3, 2011	Mount Lemmon	Mount Lemmon Survey	·	1.9 km	MPC · JPL
779238	2011 NH_{6}	—	July 1, 2011	Kitt Peak	Spacewatch	·	1.9 km	MPC · JPL
779239	2011 NV_{6}	—	July 1, 2011	Kitt Peak	Spacewatch	·	2.1 km	MPC · JPL
779240	2011 NC_{7}	—	July 2, 2011	Mount Lemmon	Mount Lemmon Survey	·	2.6 km	MPC · JPL
779241	2011 OF_{9}	—	July 27, 2011	Haleakala	Pan-STARRS 1	EOS	1.4 km	MPC · JPL
779242	2011 OF_{16}	—	July 26, 2011	Haleakala	Pan-STARRS 1	LIX	2.6 km	MPC · JPL
779243	2011 OW_{18}	—	March 3, 2009	Kitt Peak	Spacewatch	·	2.2 km	MPC · JPL
779244	2011 OR_{21}	—	June 24, 2011	Kitt Peak	Spacewatch	·	1.5 km	MPC · JPL
779245	2011 OJ_{24}	—	July 24, 2011	Haleakala	Haleakala	·	2.2 km	MPC · JPL
779246	2011 OY_{27}	—	June 27, 2011	Kitt Peak	Spacewatch	·	1.4 km	MPC · JPL
779247	2011 OR_{45}	—	July 28, 2011	Haleakala	Pan-STARRS 1	·	1.8 km	MPC · JPL
779248	2011 OW_{62}	—	July 28, 2011	Haleakala	Pan-STARRS 1	·	2.2 km	MPC · JPL
779249	2011 OL_{63}	—	December 31, 2013	Kitt Peak	Spacewatch	·	1.6 km	MPC · JPL
779250	2011 OT_{63}	—	August 15, 2017	Haleakala	Pan-STARRS 1	·	2.3 km	MPC · JPL
779251	2011 OO_{64}	—	July 27, 2011	Haleakala	Pan-STARRS 1	·	2.2 km	MPC · JPL
779252	2011 OM_{66}	—	December 12, 2012	Mount Lemmon	Mount Lemmon Survey	·	2.4 km	MPC · JPL
779253	2011 OR_{66}	—	September 1, 2017	Haleakala	Pan-STARRS 1	TIR	2.3 km	MPC · JPL
779254	2011 OV_{66}	—	January 20, 2015	Haleakala	Pan-STARRS 1	·	2.0 km	MPC · JPL
779255	2011 OT_{67}	—	July 28, 2011	Haleakala	Pan-STARRS 1	·	2.0 km	MPC · JPL
779256	2011 OG_{70}	—	July 27, 2011	Haleakala	Pan-STARRS 1	·	1.6 km	MPC · JPL
779257	2011 OE_{73}	—	July 28, 2011	Haleakala	Pan-STARRS 1	·	930 m	MPC · JPL
779258	2011 OF_{73}	—	July 25, 2011	Haleakala	Pan-STARRS 1	·	770 m	MPC · JPL
779259	2011 OA_{74}	—	January 13, 2008	Kitt Peak	Spacewatch	·	2.3 km	MPC · JPL
779260	2011 OE_{75}	—	July 28, 2011	Haleakala	Pan-STARRS 1	EOS	1.7 km	MPC · JPL
779261	2011 OH_{76}	—	July 27, 2011	Haleakala	Pan-STARRS 1	EOS	1.2 km	MPC · JPL
779262	2011 OS_{76}	—	July 28, 2011	Haleakala	Pan-STARRS 1	·	1.8 km	MPC · JPL
779263	2011 OB_{77}	—	July 28, 2011	Haleakala	Pan-STARRS 1	EOS	1.5 km	MPC · JPL
779264	2011 OE_{77}	—	July 28, 2011	Haleakala	Pan-STARRS 1	·	1.4 km	MPC · JPL
779265	2011 OU_{77}	—	July 27, 2011	Haleakala	Pan-STARRS 1	L5	6.4 km	MPC · JPL
779266	2011 OZ_{77}	—	July 27, 2011	Haleakala	Pan-STARRS 1	L5	5.3 km	MPC · JPL
779267	2011 OB_{78}	—	July 27, 2011	Haleakala	Pan-STARRS 1	·	2.5 km	MPC · JPL
779268	2011 OC_{78}	—	July 28, 2011	Haleakala	Pan-STARRS 1	·	1.9 km	MPC · JPL
779269	2011 PN_{17}	—	October 21, 2012	Haleakala	Pan-STARRS 1	·	1.9 km	MPC · JPL
779270	2011 PM_{18}	—	September 30, 2017	Haleakala	Pan-STARRS 1	EOS	1.7 km	MPC · JPL
779271	2011 PZ_{18}	—	August 6, 2011	Haleakala	Pan-STARRS 1	·	2.2 km	MPC · JPL
779272	2011 PJ_{20}	—	August 12, 2015	Haleakala	Pan-STARRS 1	·	600 m	MPC · JPL
779273	2011 PM_{20}	—	September 21, 2017	Haleakala	Pan-STARRS 1	·	2.7 km	MPC · JPL
779274	2011 PZ_{20}	—	August 6, 2011	Haleakala	Pan-STARRS 1	·	1.2 km	MPC · JPL
779275	2011 PF_{21}	—	November 1, 2011	Mount Lemmon	Mount Lemmon Survey	·	2.1 km	MPC · JPL
779276	2011 PW_{22}	—	August 6, 2011	Haleakala	Pan-STARRS 1	VER	1.8 km	MPC · JPL
779277	2011 PF_{23}	—	July 11, 2016	Haleakala	Pan-STARRS 1	·	2.1 km	MPC · JPL
779278	2011 PY_{23}	—	August 1, 2011	Westfield	International Astronomical Search Collaboration	·	2.1 km	MPC · JPL
779279	2011 QZ_{4}	—	August 21, 2011	Haleakala	Pan-STARRS 1	MAR	720 m	MPC · JPL
779280	2011 QS_{5}	—	August 21, 2011	Haleakala	Pan-STARRS 1	·	1.9 km	MPC · JPL
779281	2011 QV_{6}	—	August 2, 2011	Haleakala	Pan-STARRS 1	·	2.4 km	MPC · JPL
779282	2011 QA_{11}	—	August 20, 2011	Haleakala	Pan-STARRS 1	·	2.5 km	MPC · JPL
779283	2011 QK_{20}	—	August 23, 2011	Haleakala	Pan-STARRS 1	·	2.1 km	MPC · JPL
779284	2011 QH_{46}	—	August 29, 2011	Piszkéstető	K. Sárneczky	·	590 m	MPC · JPL
779285	2011 QG_{53}	—	August 29, 2011	Kitt Peak	Spacewatch	EOS	1.5 km	MPC · JPL
779286	2011 QJ_{57}	—	July 31, 2011	Mayhill-ISON	L. Elenin	·	2.5 km	MPC · JPL
779287	2011 QK_{59}	—	September 26, 2006	Kitt Peak	Spacewatch	·	1.5 km	MPC · JPL
779288	2011 QE_{76}	—	August 23, 2011	Haleakala	Pan-STARRS 1	·	980 m	MPC · JPL
779289	2011 QL_{79}	—	August 23, 2011	Haleakala	Pan-STARRS 1	·	2.2 km	MPC · JPL
779290	2011 QT_{81}	—	August 24, 2011	Haleakala	Pan-STARRS 1	EUN	690 m	MPC · JPL
779291	2011 QP_{85}	—	August 25, 2011	La Sagra	OAM	·	2.5 km	MPC · JPL
779292	2011 QD_{86}	—	August 26, 2011	Haleakala	Pan-STARRS 1	·	1.5 km	MPC · JPL
779293	2011 QO_{99}	—	August 29, 2011	Haleakala	Pan-STARRS 1	L5	6.2 km	MPC · JPL
779294	2011 QR_{101}	—	September 13, 2017	Haleakala	Pan-STARRS 1	·	2.5 km	MPC · JPL
779295	2011 QX_{101}	—	August 23, 2011	Haleakala	Pan-STARRS 1	·	2.1 km	MPC · JPL
779296	2011 QF_{103}	—	August 27, 2011	Haleakala	Pan-STARRS 1	·	2.0 km	MPC · JPL
779297	2011 QX_{105}	—	November 25, 2016	Mount Lemmon	Mount Lemmon Survey	BAR	860 m	MPC · JPL
779298	2011 QJ_{108}	—	August 30, 2011	Kitt Peak	Spacewatch	·	920 m	MPC · JPL
779299	2011 QO_{108}	—	October 7, 2016	Haleakala	Pan-STARRS 1	·	1.1 km	MPC · JPL
779300	2011 QY_{108}	—	August 31, 2011	Haleakala	Pan-STARRS 1	·	2.3 km	MPC · JPL

== 779301–779400 ==
back to top

Designation			Discovery			Properties		Ref
Permanent	Provisional	Named after	Date	Site	Discoverer(s)	Category	Diam.	Ref
779301	2011 QP_{110}	—	August 23, 2011	Haleakala	Pan-STARRS 1	·	2.5 km	MPC · JPL
779302	2011 QV_{110}	—	August 27, 2011	Haleakala	Pan-STARRS 1	·	1.6 km	MPC · JPL
779303	2011 QE_{114}	—	August 24, 2011	Haleakala	Pan-STARRS 1	·	2.5 km	MPC · JPL
779304	2011 QA_{118}	—	August 30, 2011	Haleakala	Pan-STARRS 1	·	2.1 km	MPC · JPL
779305	2011 QK_{119}	—	August 24, 2011	Haleakala	Pan-STARRS 1	EOS	1.3 km	MPC · JPL
779306	2011 RL_{5}	—	September 5, 2011	Haleakala	Pan-STARRS 1	·	2.3 km	MPC · JPL
779307	2011 RK_{12}	—	September 4, 2011	Haleakala	Pan-STARRS 1	·	2.6 km	MPC · JPL
779308	2011 RN_{18}	—	September 8, 2011	Kitt Peak	Spacewatch	THM	1.8 km	MPC · JPL
779309	2011 RU_{20}	—	September 2, 2011	Haleakala	Pan-STARRS 1	VER	2.0 km	MPC · JPL
779310	2011 RW_{20}	—	September 2, 2011	Haleakala	Pan-STARRS 1	·	2.4 km	MPC · JPL
779311	2011 RP_{21}	—	September 2, 2011	Haleakala	Pan-STARRS 1	·	1.7 km	MPC · JPL
779312	2011 RW_{21}	—	September 4, 2011	Haleakala	Pan-STARRS 1	·	2.8 km	MPC · JPL
779313	2011 RC_{22}	—	September 2, 2011	Haleakala	Pan-STARRS 1	VER	2.0 km	MPC · JPL
779314	2011 RD_{22}	—	September 4, 2011	Haleakala	Pan-STARRS 1	·	2.1 km	MPC · JPL
779315	2011 RQ_{22}	—	September 7, 2011	Kitt Peak	Spacewatch	·	2.3 km	MPC · JPL
779316	2011 RU_{22}	—	September 4, 2011	Haleakala	Pan-STARRS 1	·	2.1 km	MPC · JPL
779317	2011 RA_{23}	—	September 4, 2011	Haleakala	Pan-STARRS 1	·	2.1 km	MPC · JPL
779318	2011 RL_{23}	—	September 2, 2011	Haleakala	Pan-STARRS 1	·	2.1 km	MPC · JPL
779319	2011 RL_{25}	—	August 7, 2016	Haleakala	Pan-STARRS 1	EUP	2.6 km	MPC · JPL
779320	2011 RM_{26}	—	September 4, 2011	Haleakala	Pan-STARRS 1	·	1.9 km	MPC · JPL
779321	2011 RZ_{27}	—	September 4, 2011	Haleakala	Pan-STARRS 1	·	2.6 km	MPC · JPL
779322	2011 RA_{28}	—	September 4, 2011	Kitt Peak	Spacewatch	·	670 m	MPC · JPL
779323	2011 RK_{28}	—	September 4, 2011	Haleakala	Pan-STARRS 1	·	2.0 km	MPC · JPL
779324	2011 RQ_{28}	—	September 5, 2011	Haleakala	Pan-STARRS 1	·	1.9 km	MPC · JPL
779325	2011 RU_{29}	—	September 2, 2011	Haleakala	Pan-STARRS 1	·	1.4 km	MPC · JPL
779326	2011 RH_{30}	—	September 4, 2011	Haleakala	Pan-STARRS 1	·	1.7 km	MPC · JPL
779327	2011 RQ_{30}	—	September 4, 2011	Haleakala	Pan-STARRS 1	·	1.3 km	MPC · JPL
779328	2011 RT_{31}	—	September 4, 2011	Haleakala	Pan-STARRS 1	3:2	3.2 km	MPC · JPL
779329	2011 RN_{32}	—	September 2, 2011	Haleakala	Pan-STARRS 1	·	1.2 km	MPC · JPL
779330	2011 RL_{33}	—	September 2, 2011	Haleakala	Pan-STARRS 1	(5)	810 m	MPC · JPL
779331	2011 RT_{33}	—	September 4, 2011	Haleakala	Pan-STARRS 1	·	2.3 km	MPC · JPL
779332	2011 RX_{34}	—	September 4, 2011	Haleakala	Pan-STARRS 1	·	2.4 km	MPC · JPL
779333	2011 RK_{40}	—	September 4, 2011	Haleakala	Pan-STARRS 1	EOS	1.5 km	MPC · JPL
779334	2011 RO_{40}	—	September 2, 2011	Haleakala	Pan-STARRS 1	·	1.8 km	MPC · JPL
779335	2011 RJ_{41}	—	September 2, 2011	Haleakala	Pan-STARRS 1	·	1.7 km	MPC · JPL
779336	2011 RU_{41}	—	September 4, 2011	Haleakala	Pan-STARRS 1	·	2.3 km	MPC · JPL
779337	2011 RV_{41}	—	September 4, 2011	Haleakala	Pan-STARRS 1	·	2.1 km	MPC · JPL
779338	2011 SC_{2}	—	September 17, 2011	Haleakala	Pan-STARRS 1	HYG	2.1 km	MPC · JPL
779339	2011 SK_{9}	—	September 19, 2011	Mount Lemmon	Mount Lemmon Survey	·	1.4 km	MPC · JPL
779340	2011 SZ_{10}	—	September 19, 2011	Haleakala	Pan-STARRS 1	RAF	470 m	MPC · JPL
779341	2011 SO_{11}	—	September 4, 2011	Haleakala	Pan-STARRS 1	·	2.2 km	MPC · JPL
779342	2011 SE_{12}	—	October 16, 2007	Catalina	CSS	·	1.2 km	MPC · JPL
779343	2011 SG_{13}	—	September 22, 2003	Kitt Peak	Spacewatch	T_{j} (2.97) · 3:2	3.7 km	MPC · JPL
779344	2011 SV_{16}	—	September 19, 2011	Mount Lemmon	Mount Lemmon Survey	·	1.5 km	MPC · JPL
779345	2011 SW_{16}	—	August 30, 2011	Haleakala	Pan-STARRS 1	·	1.9 km	MPC · JPL
779346	2011 SF_{17}	—	September 19, 2011	Mount Lemmon	Mount Lemmon Survey	·	820 m	MPC · JPL
779347	2011 SA_{20}	—	August 30, 2011	Piszkés-tető	K. Sárneczky, S. Kürti	·	1.1 km	MPC · JPL
779348	2011 SA_{30}	—	September 20, 2011	Mount Lemmon	Mount Lemmon Survey	·	1.4 km	MPC · JPL
779349	2011 SF_{31}	—	September 21, 2011	Mount Lemmon	Mount Lemmon Survey	·	1.1 km	MPC · JPL
779350	2011 SA_{32}	—	September 21, 2011	Mount Lemmon	Mount Lemmon Survey	TIR	2.0 km	MPC · JPL
779351	2011 SN_{44}	—	September 18, 2011	Mount Lemmon	Mount Lemmon Survey	·	2.5 km	MPC · JPL
779352	2011 SV_{45}	—	November 2, 2007	Kitt Peak	Spacewatch	HOF	2.0 km	MPC · JPL
779353	2011 SF_{46}	—	February 28, 2009	Mount Lemmon	Mount Lemmon Survey	·	1.3 km	MPC · JPL
779354	2011 SP_{48}	—	October 7, 2007	Mount Lemmon	Mount Lemmon Survey	(5)	770 m	MPC · JPL
779355	2011 SJ_{49}	—	September 20, 2011	Mount Lemmon	Mount Lemmon Survey	·	2.0 km	MPC · JPL
779356	2011 SN_{54}	—	September 23, 2011	Haleakala	Pan-STARRS 1	3:2 · SHU	4.1 km	MPC · JPL
779357	2011 SW_{54}	—	September 23, 2011	Haleakala	Pan-STARRS 1	·	2.8 km	MPC · JPL
779358	2011 SM_{55}	—	September 23, 2011	Haleakala	Pan-STARRS 1	·	2.2 km	MPC · JPL
779359	2011 SN_{73}	—	September 4, 2011	Haleakala	Pan-STARRS 1	·	1.2 km	MPC · JPL
779360	2011 SU_{75}	—	September 20, 2011	Mount Lemmon	Mount Lemmon Survey	·	1.8 km	MPC · JPL
779361	2011 SF_{76}	—	September 4, 2011	Haleakala	Pan-STARRS 1	·	910 m	MPC · JPL
779362	2011 SR_{76}	—	September 20, 2011	Mount Lemmon	Mount Lemmon Survey	·	2.2 km	MPC · JPL
779363	2011 SR_{78}	—	September 20, 2011	Mount Lemmon	Mount Lemmon Survey	·	1.4 km	MPC · JPL
779364	2011 SZ_{79}	—	September 20, 2011	Mount Lemmon	Mount Lemmon Survey	·	630 m	MPC · JPL
779365	2011 SB_{85}	—	September 21, 2011	Kitt Peak	Spacewatch	·	2.5 km	MPC · JPL
779366	2011 SQ_{85}	—	September 21, 2011	Kitt Peak	Spacewatch	LIX	2.7 km	MPC · JPL
779367	2011 SD_{89}	—	November 19, 2007	Kitt Peak	Spacewatch	·	890 m	MPC · JPL
779368	2011 SV_{93}	—	August 10, 2011	Haleakala	Pan-STARRS 1	·	2.3 km	MPC · JPL
779369	2011 SQ_{94}	—	September 24, 2011	Mount Lemmon	Mount Lemmon Survey	·	2.4 km	MPC · JPL
779370	2011 SD_{96}	—	October 9, 2007	Kitt Peak	Spacewatch	·	920 m	MPC · JPL
779371	2011 SA_{99}	—	September 23, 2011	Mount Lemmon	Mount Lemmon Survey	VER	2.0 km	MPC · JPL
779372	2011 SD_{116}	—	September 21, 2011	Haleakala	Pan-STARRS 1	BAR	1.2 km	MPC · JPL
779373	2011 ST_{119}	—	December 13, 2007	Socorro	LINEAR	(5)	870 m	MPC · JPL
779374	2011 SW_{129}	—	September 23, 2011	Haleakala	Pan-STARRS 1	·	1.1 km	MPC · JPL
779375	2011 SW_{137}	—	September 23, 2011	Mount Lemmon	Mount Lemmon Survey	·	2.1 km	MPC · JPL
779376	2011 SA_{138}	—	September 23, 2011	Mount Lemmon	Mount Lemmon Survey	·	1.0 km	MPC · JPL
779377	2011 SN_{143}	—	September 23, 2011	Haleakala	Pan-STARRS 1	·	1.3 km	MPC · JPL
779378	2011 SQ_{147}	—	October 11, 2007	Kitt Peak	Spacewatch	·	850 m	MPC · JPL
779379	2011 SO_{148}	—	September 26, 2011	Mount Lemmon	Mount Lemmon Survey	·	1.8 km	MPC · JPL
779380	2011 SQ_{148}	—	September 26, 2011	Mount Lemmon	Mount Lemmon Survey	·	1.9 km	MPC · JPL
779381	2011 SV_{148}	—	September 28, 2000	Kitt Peak	Spacewatch	HYG	2.0 km	MPC · JPL
779382	2011 SO_{149}	—	September 8, 2011	Kitt Peak	Spacewatch	·	1.0 km	MPC · JPL
779383	2011 SK_{150}	—	July 3, 2005	Mount Lemmon	Mount Lemmon Survey	THM	1.9 km	MPC · JPL
779384	2011 SW_{151}	—	September 26, 2011	Haleakala	Pan-STARRS 1	EOS	1.2 km	MPC · JPL
779385	2011 SJ_{153}	—	September 26, 2011	Haleakala	Pan-STARRS 1	·	1.8 km	MPC · JPL
779386	2011 SJ_{154}	—	September 26, 2011	Haleakala	Pan-STARRS 1	·	1.6 km	MPC · JPL
779387	2011 SJ_{157}	—	September 26, 2011	Haleakala	Pan-STARRS 1	THM	1.8 km	MPC · JPL
779388	2011 SM_{158}	—	September 22, 2011	Kitt Peak	Spacewatch	VER	2.0 km	MPC · JPL
779389	2011 SH_{162}	—	September 23, 2011	Kitt Peak	Spacewatch	ELF	2.7 km	MPC · JPL
779390	2011 SZ_{163}	—	September 23, 2011	Haleakala	Pan-STARRS 1	HOF	2.1 km	MPC · JPL
779391	2011 SB_{194}	—	September 8, 2011	Kitt Peak	Spacewatch	·	1.0 km	MPC · JPL
779392	2011 SE_{197}	—	September 18, 2011	Mount Lemmon	Mount Lemmon Survey	·	2.0 km	MPC · JPL
779393	2011 SA_{201}	—	March 15, 2004	Kitt Peak	Spacewatch	TIR	2.2 km	MPC · JPL
779394	2011 SC_{201}	—	September 18, 2011	Mount Lemmon	Mount Lemmon Survey	·	2.6 km	MPC · JPL
779395	2011 SR_{210}	—	October 9, 2007	Mount Lemmon	Mount Lemmon Survey	·	870 m	MPC · JPL
779396	2011 SY_{217}	—	September 24, 2011	Mount Lemmon	Mount Lemmon Survey	·	2.4 km	MPC · JPL
779397	2011 SB_{218}	—	September 24, 2011	Haleakala	Pan-STARRS 1	·	990 m	MPC · JPL
779398	2011 SC_{227}	—	September 20, 2011	La Sagra	OAM	·	2.7 km	MPC · JPL
779399	2011 SX_{228}	—	September 29, 2011	Piszkéstető	K. Sárneczky	·	2.2 km	MPC · JPL
779400	2011 SY_{231}	—	September 25, 2011	Haleakala	Pan-STARRS 1	·	830 m	MPC · JPL

== 779401–779500 ==
back to top

Designation			Discovery			Properties		Ref
Permanent	Provisional	Named after	Date	Site	Discoverer(s)	Category	Diam.	Ref
779401	2011 SD_{232}	—	September 30, 2011	Mount Lemmon	Mount Lemmon Survey	·	830 m	MPC · JPL
779402	2011 ST_{237}	—	September 4, 2011	Haleakala	Pan-STARRS 1	·	1.8 km	MPC · JPL
779403	2011 SX_{241}	—	September 26, 2011	Mount Lemmon	Mount Lemmon Survey	·	2.0 km	MPC · JPL
779404	2011 SA_{243}	—	November 3, 2007	Mount Lemmon	Mount Lemmon Survey	EUN	780 m	MPC · JPL
779405	2011 SL_{243}	—	September 26, 2011	Haleakala	Pan-STARRS 1	·	1.5 km	MPC · JPL
779406	2011 SY_{244}	—	April 10, 2005	Kitt Peak	Deep Ecliptic Survey	EUN	730 m	MPC · JPL
779407	2011 SH_{247}	—	September 29, 2011	Mount Lemmon	Mount Lemmon Survey	·	2.2 km	MPC · JPL
779408	2011 SZ_{247}	—	September 29, 1994	Kitt Peak	Spacewatch	·	2.2 km	MPC · JPL
779409	2011 SU_{253}	—	September 8, 2011	Kitt Peak	Spacewatch	·	2.4 km	MPC · JPL
779410	2011 SG_{257}	—	September 23, 2011	Kitt Peak	Spacewatch	·	1.4 km	MPC · JPL
779411	2011 ST_{267}	—	September 21, 2011	Haleakala	Pan-STARRS 1	·	1.0 km	MPC · JPL
779412	2011 ST_{273}	—	July 5, 2011	Haleakala	Pan-STARRS 1	·	1.6 km	MPC · JPL
779413	2011 SX_{274}	—	September 23, 2011	Haleakala	Pan-STARRS 1	·	1.1 km	MPC · JPL
779414	2011 SJ_{278}	—	September 18, 2011	Mount Lemmon	Mount Lemmon Survey	·	1.3 km	MPC · JPL
779415	2011 ST_{279}	—	September 24, 2011	Haleakala	Pan-STARRS 1	·	1.4 km	MPC · JPL
779416	2011 SG_{280}	—	September 26, 2011	Kitt Peak	Spacewatch	·	1.5 km	MPC · JPL
779417	2011 SW_{280}	—	September 23, 2011	Haleakala	Pan-STARRS 1	·	2.2 km	MPC · JPL
779418	2011 SR_{282}	—	January 19, 2013	Kitt Peak	Spacewatch	·	2.2 km	MPC · JPL
779419	2011 SV_{282}	—	September 19, 2011	Haleakala	Pan-STARRS 1	·	2.4 km	MPC · JPL
779420	2011 SN_{284}	—	September 29, 2011	Mount Lemmon	Mount Lemmon Survey	·	2.7 km	MPC · JPL
779421	2011 SB_{285}	—	September 21, 2011	Mount Lemmon	Mount Lemmon Survey	URS	2.5 km	MPC · JPL
779422	2011 SS_{285}	—	September 19, 2011	Haleakala	Pan-STARRS 1	·	2.2 km	MPC · JPL
779423	2011 SQ_{286}	—	September 23, 2011	Mount Lemmon	Mount Lemmon Survey	VER	1.9 km	MPC · JPL
779424	2011 SA_{287}	—	September 25, 2011	Haleakala	Pan-STARRS 1	·	2.6 km	MPC · JPL
779425	2011 SJ_{287}	—	August 1, 2016	Haleakala	Pan-STARRS 1	·	1.9 km	MPC · JPL
779426	2011 SW_{287}	—	September 24, 2011	Haleakala	Pan-STARRS 1	·	2.3 km	MPC · JPL
779427	2011 SA_{288}	—	August 7, 2016	Haleakala	Pan-STARRS 1	·	2.3 km	MPC · JPL
779428	2011 SM_{288}	—	September 25, 2011	Haleakala	Pan-STARRS 1	·	1.9 km	MPC · JPL
779429	2011 SQ_{288}	—	August 8, 2016	Haleakala	Pan-STARRS 1	·	1.9 km	MPC · JPL
779430	2011 SJ_{290}	—	September 19, 2011	Mount Lemmon	Mount Lemmon Survey	·	2.1 km	MPC · JPL
779431	2011 SX_{291}	—	July 9, 2016	Haleakala	Pan-STARRS 1	·	1.9 km	MPC · JPL
779432	2011 SS_{293}	—	September 25, 2011	Haleakala	Pan-STARRS 1	·	2.5 km	MPC · JPL
779433	2011 SZ_{293}	—	September 26, 2011	Haleakala	Pan-STARRS 1	·	1.8 km	MPC · JPL
779434	2011 SF_{295}	—	May 26, 2014	Haleakala	Pan-STARRS 1	·	1.1 km	MPC · JPL
779435	2011 SC_{296}	—	September 27, 2017	Mount Lemmon	Mount Lemmon Survey	·	2.1 km	MPC · JPL
779436	2011 SH_{296}	—	September 24, 2011	Haleakala	Pan-STARRS 1	·	800 m	MPC · JPL
779437	2011 SE_{298}	—	May 28, 2014	Haleakala	Pan-STARRS 1	·	980 m	MPC · JPL
779438	2011 SS_{301}	—	August 25, 2011	Piszkéstető	K. Sárneczky	·	950 m	MPC · JPL
779439	2011 SF_{302}	—	September 23, 2011	Mount Lemmon	Mount Lemmon Survey	·	2.0 km	MPC · JPL
779440	2011 SP_{302}	—	June 22, 2015	Haleakala	Pan-STARRS 1	HOF	1.8 km	MPC · JPL
779441	2011 ST_{302}	—	September 21, 2011	Kitt Peak	Spacewatch	VER	1.8 km	MPC · JPL
779442	2011 SG_{303}	—	June 29, 2015	Haleakala	Pan-STARRS 1	RAF	600 m	MPC · JPL
779443	2011 SN_{303}	—	August 3, 2016	Haleakala	Pan-STARRS 1	·	2.3 km	MPC · JPL
779444	2011 SA_{304}	—	April 19, 2015	Cerro Tololo	DECam	·	1.9 km	MPC · JPL
779445	2011 ST_{304}	—	June 12, 2015	Mount Lemmon	Mount Lemmon Survey	·	2.2 km	MPC · JPL
779446	2011 SY_{304}	—	September 20, 2011	Mount Lemmon	Mount Lemmon Survey	·	2.1 km	MPC · JPL
779447	2011 SC_{305}	—	December 8, 2012	Mount Lemmon	Mount Lemmon Survey	THM	1.5 km	MPC · JPL
779448	2011 SJ_{305}	—	September 26, 2011	Haleakala	Pan-STARRS 1	JUN	710 m	MPC · JPL
779449	2011 SQ_{305}	—	May 21, 2015	Haleakala	Pan-STARRS 1	·	1.7 km	MPC · JPL
779450	2011 SU_{306}	—	September 24, 2011	Haleakala	Pan-STARRS 1	VER	1.9 km	MPC · JPL
779451	2011 SM_{307}	—	September 19, 2011	Mount Lemmon	Mount Lemmon Survey	·	1.9 km	MPC · JPL
779452	2011 SW_{308}	—	September 24, 2011	Haleakala	Pan-STARRS 1	·	2.2 km	MPC · JPL
779453	2011 SY_{308}	—	September 20, 2011	Haleakala	Pan-STARRS 1	EOS	1.3 km	MPC · JPL
779454	2011 SU_{309}	—	September 23, 2011	Haleakala	Pan-STARRS 1	·	2.2 km	MPC · JPL
779455	2011 SG_{310}	—	September 29, 2011	Kitt Peak	Spacewatch	·	2.4 km	MPC · JPL
779456	2011 SR_{310}	—	September 29, 2011	Mount Lemmon	Mount Lemmon Survey	·	2.3 km	MPC · JPL
779457	2011 ST_{310}	—	September 25, 2011	Haleakala	Pan-STARRS 1	T_{j} (2.92)	2.7 km	MPC · JPL
779458	2011 SV_{312}	—	September 27, 2011	Mount Lemmon	Mount Lemmon Survey	VER	2.1 km	MPC · JPL
779459	2011 SQ_{315}	—	September 22, 2011	Kitt Peak	Spacewatch	EOS	1.7 km	MPC · JPL
779460	2011 SD_{318}	—	November 20, 2003	Apache Point	SDSS	·	980 m	MPC · JPL
779461	2011 SW_{318}	—	September 23, 2011	Kitt Peak	Spacewatch	·	1.3 km	MPC · JPL
779462	2011 SQ_{319}	—	September 18, 2011	Mount Lemmon	Mount Lemmon Survey	·	1.4 km	MPC · JPL
779463	2011 SK_{320}	—	September 24, 2011	Haleakala	Pan-STARRS 1	·	1.9 km	MPC · JPL
779464	2011 SE_{321}	—	September 27, 2011	Mount Lemmon	Mount Lemmon Survey	·	830 m	MPC · JPL
779465	2011 SR_{321}	—	September 19, 2011	Catalina	CSS	EUN	870 m	MPC · JPL
779466	2011 SU_{321}	—	September 29, 2011	Mount Lemmon	Mount Lemmon Survey	·	860 m	MPC · JPL
779467	2011 SO_{322}	—	September 22, 2011	Kitt Peak	Spacewatch	MRX	700 m	MPC · JPL
779468	2011 SO_{323}	—	September 18, 2011	Mount Lemmon	Mount Lemmon Survey	VER	2.0 km	MPC · JPL
779469	2011 ST_{323}	—	September 25, 2011	Haleakala	Pan-STARRS 1	·	2.0 km	MPC · JPL
779470	2011 SU_{326}	—	September 21, 2011	Mount Lemmon	Mount Lemmon Survey	·	970 m	MPC · JPL
779471	2011 SU_{328}	—	September 21, 2011	Haleakala	Pan-STARRS 1	TIR	2.2 km	MPC · JPL
779472	2011 ST_{330}	—	September 21, 2011	Mount Lemmon	Mount Lemmon Survey	·	1.8 km	MPC · JPL
779473	2011 SB_{331}	—	September 24, 2011	Kitt Peak	Spacewatch	·	2.4 km	MPC · JPL
779474	2011 SR_{331}	—	September 23, 2011	Kitt Peak	Spacewatch	·	2.2 km	MPC · JPL
779475	2011 SL_{332}	—	September 25, 2011	Haleakala	Pan-STARRS 1	·	2.4 km	MPC · JPL
779476	2011 SK_{334}	—	September 28, 2011	Kitt Peak	Spacewatch	(5)	730 m	MPC · JPL
779477	2011 SL_{334}	—	September 24, 2011	Mount Lemmon	Mount Lemmon Survey	·	1.2 km	MPC · JPL
779478	2011 SM_{335}	—	September 27, 2011	Mount Lemmon	Mount Lemmon Survey	EOS	1.4 km	MPC · JPL
779479	2011 SQ_{338}	—	September 22, 2011	Kitt Peak	Spacewatch	(5)	680 m	MPC · JPL
779480	2011 SF_{346}	—	September 20, 2011	Kitt Peak	Spacewatch	·	2.3 km	MPC · JPL
779481	2011 SH_{346}	—	September 26, 2011	Mount Lemmon	Mount Lemmon Survey	·	1.8 km	MPC · JPL
779482	2011 SM_{346}	—	September 23, 2011	Kitt Peak	Spacewatch	·	2.1 km	MPC · JPL
779483	2011 SB_{347}	—	September 20, 2011	Haleakala	Pan-STARRS 1	·	1.7 km	MPC · JPL
779484	2011 SY_{347}	—	September 18, 2011	Mount Lemmon	Mount Lemmon Survey	·	3.0 km	MPC · JPL
779485	2011 SB_{350}	—	September 25, 2011	Haleakala	Pan-STARRS 1	·	1.8 km	MPC · JPL
779486	2011 SV_{350}	—	September 19, 2011	Haleakala	Pan-STARRS 1	·	2.2 km	MPC · JPL
779487	2011 SR_{352}	—	September 23, 2011	Haleakala	Pan-STARRS 1	·	2.3 km	MPC · JPL
779488	2011 SJ_{354}	—	September 29, 2011	Mount Lemmon	Mount Lemmon Survey	·	2.1 km	MPC · JPL
779489	2011 SS_{354}	—	February 12, 2008	Kitt Peak	Spacewatch	·	1.9 km	MPC · JPL
779490	2011 SZ_{354}	—	September 27, 2011	Mount Lemmon	Mount Lemmon Survey	·	2.3 km	MPC · JPL
779491	2011 SM_{355}	—	September 29, 2011	Kitt Peak	Spacewatch	EOS	1.5 km	MPC · JPL
779492	2011 SV_{358}	—	September 19, 2011	Mount Lemmon	Mount Lemmon Survey	·	2.7 km	MPC · JPL
779493	2011 SD_{360}	—	September 24, 2011	Mount Lemmon	Mount Lemmon Survey	·	1.9 km	MPC · JPL
779494	2011 SL_{360}	—	September 24, 2011	Haleakala	Pan-STARRS 1	·	2.2 km	MPC · JPL
779495	2011 SS_{363}	—	September 29, 2011	Mount Lemmon	Mount Lemmon Survey	·	1.0 km	MPC · JPL
779496	2011 TQ_{18}	—	March 14, 2013	Mount Lemmon	Mount Lemmon Survey	·	1.1 km	MPC · JPL
779497	2011 TX_{18}	—	October 4, 2011	Piszkés-tető	K. Sárneczky, S. Kürti	EOS	1.6 km	MPC · JPL
779498	2011 TH_{19}	—	October 5, 2011	Piszkéstető	K. Sárneczky	·	860 m	MPC · JPL
779499	2011 TU_{19}	—	February 28, 2014	Haleakala	Pan-STARRS 1	·	1.8 km	MPC · JPL
779500	2011 TY_{21}	—	October 3, 2011	Piszkés-tető	K. Sárneczky, S. Kürti	·	1.3 km	MPC · JPL

== 779501–779600 ==
back to top

Designation			Discovery			Properties		Ref
Permanent	Provisional	Named after	Date	Site	Discoverer(s)	Category	Diam.	Ref
779501	2011 UG	—	September 24, 2011	Haleakala	Pan-STARRS 1	·	880 m	MPC · JPL
779502	2011 UM_{9}	—	October 18, 2011	Mount Lemmon	Mount Lemmon Survey	·	940 m	MPC · JPL
779503	2011 UW_{15}	—	October 18, 2011	Kitt Peak	Spacewatch	·	2.8 km	MPC · JPL
779504	2011 UB_{16}	—	October 18, 2011	Mount Lemmon	Mount Lemmon Survey	·	1.9 km	MPC · JPL
779505	2011 UT_{18}	—	September 23, 2011	Haleakala	Pan-STARRS 1	·	2.4 km	MPC · JPL
779506	2011 UX_{30}	—	October 18, 2011	Mount Lemmon	Mount Lemmon Survey	·	1.2 km	MPC · JPL
779507	2011 UY_{33}	—	October 19, 2011	Haleakala	Pan-STARRS 1	·	810 m	MPC · JPL
779508	2011 UQ_{34}	—	September 28, 2011	Mount Lemmon	Mount Lemmon Survey	·	1.9 km	MPC · JPL
779509	2011 UD_{35}	—	October 19, 2011	Mount Lemmon	Mount Lemmon Survey	EOS	1.3 km	MPC · JPL
779510	2011 UN_{36}	—	October 19, 2011	Mount Lemmon	Mount Lemmon Survey	URS	2.6 km	MPC · JPL
779511	2011 UG_{42}	—	September 28, 2011	Mount Lemmon	Mount Lemmon Survey	(5)	960 m	MPC · JPL
779512	2011 UL_{42}	—	October 19, 2011	Mayhill-ISON	L. Elenin	URS	2.6 km	MPC · JPL
779513	2011 UP_{43}	—	September 22, 2011	Kitt Peak	Spacewatch	·	2.3 km	MPC · JPL
779514	2011 UA_{47}	—	October 18, 2011	Kitt Peak	Spacewatch	·	770 m	MPC · JPL
779515	2011 UT_{50}	—	October 18, 2011	Kitt Peak	Spacewatch	·	2.2 km	MPC · JPL
779516	2011 UV_{52}	—	October 18, 2011	Kitt Peak	Spacewatch	·	2.5 km	MPC · JPL
779517	2011 UA_{61}	—	October 21, 2011	Mount Lemmon	Mount Lemmon Survey	·	2.1 km	MPC · JPL
779518	2011 UB_{61}	—	October 21, 2011	Mount Lemmon	Mount Lemmon Survey	·	2.3 km	MPC · JPL
779519	2011 UO_{66}	—	October 20, 2011	Mount Lemmon	Mount Lemmon Survey	·	1.2 km	MPC · JPL
779520	2011 UC_{69}	—	September 29, 2011	Mount Lemmon	Mount Lemmon Survey	·	1.7 km	MPC · JPL
779521	2011 UX_{71}	—	November 1, 2007	Kitt Peak	Spacewatch	·	860 m	MPC · JPL
779522	2011 UD_{85}	—	October 19, 2011	Kitt Peak	Spacewatch	·	830 m	MPC · JPL
779523	2011 UA_{93}	—	September 30, 2011	Kitt Peak	Spacewatch	·	1.0 km	MPC · JPL
779524	2011 UO_{93}	—	October 18, 2011	Mount Lemmon	Mount Lemmon Survey	·	1.1 km	MPC · JPL
779525	2011 UG_{96}	—	October 19, 2011	Mount Lemmon	Mount Lemmon Survey	·	820 m	MPC · JPL
779526	2011 UP_{100}	—	October 20, 2011	Mount Lemmon	Mount Lemmon Survey	AGN	880 m	MPC · JPL
779527	2011 UB_{101}	—	October 20, 2011	Mount Lemmon	Mount Lemmon Survey	·	950 m	MPC · JPL
779528	2011 UY_{113}	—	October 30, 2002	Kitt Peak	Spacewatch	·	1.2 km	MPC · JPL
779529	2011 UR_{118}	—	October 11, 2007	Kitt Peak	Spacewatch	BRG	1.0 km	MPC · JPL
779530	2011 UA_{119}	—	November 18, 2007	Mount Lemmon	Mount Lemmon Survey	·	1 km	MPC · JPL
779531	2011 UR_{126}	—	October 20, 2011	Mount Lemmon	Mount Lemmon Survey	·	970 m	MPC · JPL
779532	2011 UF_{127}	—	October 20, 2011	Kitt Peak	Spacewatch	(5)	930 m	MPC · JPL
779533	2011 UQ_{133}	—	October 23, 2011	Haleakala	Pan-STARRS 1	·	760 m	MPC · JPL
779534	2011 UV_{137}	—	October 21, 2011	Kitt Peak	Spacewatch	·	2.3 km	MPC · JPL
779535	2011 UT_{141}	—	October 23, 2011	Kitt Peak	Spacewatch	LUT	3.3 km	MPC · JPL
779536	2011 UZ_{150}	—	October 18, 2011	Kitt Peak	Spacewatch	EUN	830 m	MPC · JPL
779537	2011 UR_{152}	—	October 21, 2011	Mount Lemmon	Mount Lemmon Survey	(5)	790 m	MPC · JPL
779538	2011 UL_{159}	—	November 3, 2007	Kitt Peak	Spacewatch	·	970 m	MPC · JPL
779539	2011 UQ_{163}	—	October 25, 2011	Haleakala	Pan-STARRS 1	·	2.7 km	MPC · JPL
779540	2011 UA_{165}	—	October 26, 2011	Haleakala	Pan-STARRS 1	·	1.1 km	MPC · JPL
779541	2011 UE_{167}	—	September 4, 2011	Haleakala	Pan-STARRS 1	·	1.4 km	MPC · JPL
779542	2011 UM_{170}	—	October 21, 2011	Mount Lemmon	Mount Lemmon Survey	TIR	2.0 km	MPC · JPL
779543	2011 UY_{176}	—	October 24, 2011	Kitt Peak	Spacewatch	HNS	790 m	MPC · JPL
779544	2011 UG_{182}	—	October 25, 2011	Mount Lemmon	Mount Lemmon Survey	VER	2.5 km	MPC · JPL
779545	2011 UV_{190}	—	October 19, 2011	Mount Lemmon	Mount Lemmon Survey	·	2.6 km	MPC · JPL
779546	2011 UK_{191}	—	October 21, 2011	Kitt Peak	Spacewatch	·	770 m	MPC · JPL
779547	2011 UV_{205}	—	September 24, 2011	Haleakala	Pan-STARRS 1	LIX	2.4 km	MPC · JPL
779548	2011 UY_{206}	—	November 8, 2007	Kitt Peak	Spacewatch	·	1.0 km	MPC · JPL
779549	2011 UD_{208}	—	September 23, 2011	Kitt Peak	Spacewatch	JUN	640 m	MPC · JPL
779550	2011 UK_{208}	—	October 24, 2011	Mount Lemmon	Mount Lemmon Survey	·	2.3 km	MPC · JPL
779551	2011 UR_{227}	—	October 24, 2011	Mount Lemmon	Mount Lemmon Survey	KOR	1.0 km	MPC · JPL
779552	2011 UA_{228}	—	October 24, 2011	Mount Lemmon	Mount Lemmon Survey	·	2.2 km	MPC · JPL
779553	2011 UU_{228}	—	October 24, 2011	Mount Lemmon	Mount Lemmon Survey	·	1.5 km	MPC · JPL
779554	2011 UC_{233}	—	November 18, 2007	Mount Lemmon	Mount Lemmon Survey	·	1.2 km	MPC · JPL
779555	2011 UG_{233}	—	December 1, 2005	Kitt Peak	Wasserman, L. H., Millis, R. L.	·	2.0 km	MPC · JPL
779556	2011 UA_{234}	—	October 24, 2011	Haleakala	Pan-STARRS 1	·	1.0 km	MPC · JPL
779557	2011 UT_{235}	—	October 24, 2011	Haleakala	Pan-STARRS 1	·	1.6 km	MPC · JPL
779558	2011 UL_{247}	—	October 26, 2011	Haleakala	Pan-STARRS 1	·	1.0 km	MPC · JPL
779559	2011 UB_{248}	—	October 26, 2011	Haleakala	Pan-STARRS 1	·	1.0 km	MPC · JPL
779560	2011 UA_{253}	—	October 26, 2011	Haleakala	Pan-STARRS 1	·	1.5 km	MPC · JPL
779561	2011 UE_{260}	—	September 27, 2011	Mount Lemmon	Mount Lemmon Survey	EUN	830 m	MPC · JPL
779562	2011 UR_{260}	—	October 25, 2011	Haleakala	Pan-STARRS 1	ADE	1.1 km	MPC · JPL
779563	2011 UL_{261}	—	October 23, 2011	Kitt Peak	Spacewatch	·	1.1 km	MPC · JPL
779564	2011 UK_{268}	—	October 1, 2011	Mount Lemmon	Mount Lemmon Survey	·	1.0 km	MPC · JPL
779565	2011 UZ_{276}	—	November 13, 2007	Kitt Peak	Spacewatch	·	1.0 km	MPC · JPL
779566	2011 UQ_{278}	—	October 25, 2011	Haleakala	Pan-STARRS 1	·	900 m	MPC · JPL
779567	2011 UB_{280}	—	October 24, 2011	Kitt Peak	Spacewatch	·	960 m	MPC · JPL
779568	2011 UK_{282}	—	September 23, 2011	Mount Lemmon	Mount Lemmon Survey	ADE	1.5 km	MPC · JPL
779569	2011 UM_{287}	—	October 31, 2011	Mount Lemmon	Mount Lemmon Survey	·	1.3 km	MPC · JPL
779570	2011 UO_{291}	—	September 24, 2011	Haleakala	Pan-STARRS 1	·	2.2 km	MPC · JPL
779571	2011 UT_{310}	—	October 30, 2011	Kitt Peak	Spacewatch	URS	2.2 km	MPC · JPL
779572	2011 UY_{310}	—	October 30, 2011	Kitt Peak	Spacewatch	·	1.2 km	MPC · JPL
779573	2011 UJ_{311}	—	October 22, 2011	Kitt Peak	Spacewatch	·	1.0 km	MPC · JPL
779574	2011 UK_{319}	—	October 30, 2011	Mount Lemmon	Mount Lemmon Survey	(1118)	2.7 km	MPC · JPL
779575	2011 UC_{329}	—	August 30, 2005	Kitt Peak	Spacewatch	·	2.4 km	MPC · JPL
779576	2011 UN_{334}	—	October 23, 2011	Mount Lemmon	Mount Lemmon Survey	·	2.3 km	MPC · JPL
779577	2011 UZ_{335}	—	September 20, 2011	Kitt Peak	Spacewatch	·	1.0 km	MPC · JPL
779578	2011 UQ_{345}	—	October 19, 2011	Kitt Peak	Spacewatch	VER	2.1 km	MPC · JPL
779579	2011 UR_{347}	—	October 19, 2011	Mount Lemmon	Mount Lemmon Survey	·	1.3 km	MPC · JPL
779580	2011 UF_{348}	—	October 19, 2011	Mount Lemmon	Mount Lemmon Survey	·	2.2 km	MPC · JPL
779581	2011 UP_{348}	—	October 19, 2011	Mount Lemmon	Mount Lemmon Survey	·	2.4 km	MPC · JPL
779582	2011 UK_{350}	—	October 19, 2011	Mount Lemmon	Mount Lemmon Survey	·	2.0 km	MPC · JPL
779583	2011 UD_{354}	—	October 20, 2011	Mount Lemmon	Mount Lemmon Survey	·	2.3 km	MPC · JPL
779584	2011 UU_{354}	—	October 20, 2011	Mount Lemmon	Mount Lemmon Survey	·	910 m	MPC · JPL
779585	2011 UD_{355}	—	October 20, 2011	Mount Lemmon	Mount Lemmon Survey	·	1.1 km	MPC · JPL
779586	2011 UP_{359}	—	October 20, 2011	Mount Lemmon	Mount Lemmon Survey	·	940 m	MPC · JPL
779587	2011 UD_{365}	—	October 22, 2011	Mount Lemmon	Mount Lemmon Survey	·	2.4 km	MPC · JPL
779588	2011 US_{370}	—	October 23, 2011	Mount Lemmon	Mount Lemmon Survey	HYG	2.4 km	MPC · JPL
779589	2011 UY_{370}	—	October 23, 2011	Mount Lemmon	Mount Lemmon Survey	·	1.6 km	MPC · JPL
779590	2011 UZ_{370}	—	September 24, 2011	Haleakala	Pan-STARRS 1	·	2.0 km	MPC · JPL
779591	2011 UL_{380}	—	October 24, 2011	Mount Lemmon	Mount Lemmon Survey	·	1.8 km	MPC · JPL
779592	2011 UQ_{386}	—	October 25, 2011	Haleakala	Pan-STARRS 1	·	1.5 km	MPC · JPL
779593	2011 UQ_{387}	—	October 25, 2011	Haleakala	Pan-STARRS 1	·	2.4 km	MPC · JPL
779594	2011 UN_{390}	—	October 26, 2011	Haleakala	Pan-STARRS 1	·	2.7 km	MPC · JPL
779595	2011 UP_{413}	—	November 1, 2007	Kitt Peak	Spacewatch	·	780 m	MPC · JPL
779596	2011 UM_{414}	—	October 24, 2011	Haleakala	Pan-STARRS 1	·	880 m	MPC · JPL
779597	2011 UB_{417}	—	October 25, 2011	Haleakala	Pan-STARRS 1	·	2.3 km	MPC · JPL
779598	2011 UE_{417}	—	October 25, 2011	Haleakala	Pan-STARRS 1	EOS	1.4 km	MPC · JPL
779599	2011 UK_{417}	—	October 26, 2011	Haleakala	Pan-STARRS 1	·	900 m	MPC · JPL
779600	2011 UU_{420}	—	October 23, 2011	Mount Lemmon	Mount Lemmon Survey	URS	2.3 km	MPC · JPL

== 779601–779700 ==
back to top

Designation			Discovery			Properties		Ref
Permanent	Provisional	Named after	Date	Site	Discoverer(s)	Category	Diam.	Ref
779601	2011 UQ_{421}	—	March 8, 2013	Haleakala	Pan-STARRS 1	·	980 m	MPC · JPL
779602	2011 UR_{422}	—	July 11, 2016	Haleakala	Pan-STARRS 1	·	2.5 km	MPC · JPL
779603	2011 UL_{424}	—	October 26, 2011	Haleakala	Pan-STARRS 1	EOS	1.5 km	MPC · JPL
779604	2011 US_{424}	—	August 7, 2016	Haleakala	Pan-STARRS 1	·	2.0 km	MPC · JPL
779605	2011 UW_{424}	—	October 21, 2011	Haleakala	Pan-STARRS 1	·	2.0 km	MPC · JPL
779606	2011 UX_{424}	—	August 2, 2016	Haleakala	Pan-STARRS 1	·	2.2 km	MPC · JPL
779607	2011 UA_{425}	—	October 21, 2011	Mount Lemmon	Mount Lemmon Survey	·	2.4 km	MPC · JPL
779608	2011 UR_{425}	—	September 8, 2011	Kitt Peak	Spacewatch	·	2.2 km	MPC · JPL
779609	2011 UQ_{426}	—	February 17, 2013	Kitt Peak	Spacewatch	·	1.3 km	MPC · JPL
779610	2011 UH_{431}	—	October 24, 2011	Haleakala	Pan-STARRS 1	·	1.3 km	MPC · JPL
779611	2011 UQ_{431}	—	October 26, 2011	Haleakala	Pan-STARRS 1	HNS	700 m	MPC · JPL
779612	2011 UO_{433}	—	June 24, 2015	Haleakala	Pan-STARRS 1	·	1.3 km	MPC · JPL
779613	2011 UN_{434}	—	October 11, 2015	ESA OGS	ESA OGS	·	1.0 km	MPC · JPL
779614	2011 UV_{435}	—	October 28, 2017	Haleakala	Pan-STARRS 1	·	2.3 km	MPC · JPL
779615	2011 UA_{436}	—	October 25, 2011	Haleakala	Pan-STARRS 1	·	780 m	MPC · JPL
779616	2011 UQ_{436}	—	April 23, 2014	Mount Lemmon	Mount Lemmon Survey	·	1.6 km	MPC · JPL
779617	2011 UF_{437}	—	October 15, 2015	Haleakala	Pan-STARRS 1	·	920 m	MPC · JPL
779618	2011 UJ_{437}	—	October 12, 2017	Mount Lemmon	Mount Lemmon Survey	·	2.4 km	MPC · JPL
779619	2011 UU_{437}	—	May 7, 2014	Haleakala	Pan-STARRS 1	·	2.0 km	MPC · JPL
779620	2011 UA_{438}	—	October 24, 2011	Haleakala	Pan-STARRS 1	T_{j} (2.99)	2.3 km	MPC · JPL
779621	2011 UL_{439}	—	November 1, 2015	Haleakala	Pan-STARRS 1	EUN	710 m	MPC · JPL
779622	2011 UM_{441}	—	April 29, 2014	Haleakala	Pan-STARRS 1	KOR	940 m	MPC · JPL
779623	2011 UX_{441}	—	August 10, 2015	Haleakala	Pan-STARRS 1	·	1.1 km	MPC · JPL
779624	2011 UG_{443}	—	October 25, 2011	Haleakala	Pan-STARRS 1	·	2.0 km	MPC · JPL
779625	2011 UG_{444}	—	May 4, 2014	Haleakala	Pan-STARRS 1	·	2.1 km	MPC · JPL
779626	2011 UK_{445}	—	October 25, 2011	Haleakala	Pan-STARRS 1	·	870 m	MPC · JPL
779627	2011 UM_{445}	—	October 10, 2015	Haleakala	Pan-STARRS 1	·	850 m	MPC · JPL
779628	2011 UO_{445}	—	September 12, 2016	Haleakala	Pan-STARRS 1	·	1.3 km	MPC · JPL
779629	2011 UR_{445}	—	October 21, 2011	Mount Lemmon	Mount Lemmon Survey	EOS	1.7 km	MPC · JPL
779630	2011 UU_{445}	—	May 21, 2015	Haleakala	Pan-STARRS 1	·	2.2 km	MPC · JPL
779631	2011 UB_{446}	—	October 23, 2011	Mount Lemmon	Mount Lemmon Survey	EOS	1.3 km	MPC · JPL
779632	2011 UG_{446}	—	October 24, 2011	Haleakala	Pan-STARRS 1	VER	1.8 km	MPC · JPL
779633	2011 UW_{446}	—	February 24, 2014	Haleakala	Pan-STARRS 1	·	2.3 km	MPC · JPL
779634	2011 UD_{449}	—	October 17, 2011	Kitt Peak	Spacewatch	·	1.6 km	MPC · JPL
779635	2011 UJ_{449}	—	October 19, 2011	Mount Lemmon	Mount Lemmon Survey	·	980 m	MPC · JPL
779636	2011 UM_{449}	—	October 24, 2011	Mount Lemmon	Mount Lemmon Survey	·	1.3 km	MPC · JPL
779637	2011 UY_{449}	—	October 26, 2011	Haleakala	Pan-STARRS 1	·	1.2 km	MPC · JPL
779638	2011 UK_{450}	—	October 18, 2011	Mount Lemmon	Mount Lemmon Survey	·	1.7 km	MPC · JPL
779639	2011 UP_{451}	—	October 23, 2011	Mount Lemmon	Mount Lemmon Survey	·	2.2 km	MPC · JPL
779640	2011 UP_{453}	—	October 20, 2011	Mount Lemmon	Mount Lemmon Survey	EOS	1.5 km	MPC · JPL
779641	2011 UR_{453}	—	October 25, 2011	Haleakala	Pan-STARRS 1	·	2.3 km	MPC · JPL
779642	2011 UL_{458}	—	October 23, 2011	Haleakala	Pan-STARRS 1	·	2.4 km	MPC · JPL
779643	2011 UD_{459}	—	October 24, 2011	Haleakala	Pan-STARRS 1	·	2.1 km	MPC · JPL
779644	2011 UW_{460}	—	October 25, 2011	Haleakala	Pan-STARRS 1	·	1.1 km	MPC · JPL
779645	2011 UH_{461}	—	October 25, 2011	Haleakala	Pan-STARRS 1	MAR	760 m	MPC · JPL
779646	2011 UZ_{462}	—	October 20, 2011	Mount Lemmon	Mount Lemmon Survey	·	980 m	MPC · JPL
779647	2011 UH_{463}	—	October 23, 2011	Haleakala	Pan-STARRS 1	(10654)	2.7 km	MPC · JPL
779648	2011 UZ_{464}	—	October 20, 2011	Mount Lemmon	Mount Lemmon Survey	·	1.1 km	MPC · JPL
779649	2011 UE_{465}	—	October 24, 2011	Haleakala	Pan-STARRS 1	GEF	720 m	MPC · JPL
779650	2011 UW_{465}	—	October 19, 2011	Mount Lemmon	Mount Lemmon Survey	·	2.1 km	MPC · JPL
779651	2011 UW_{466}	—	October 26, 2011	Haleakala	Pan-STARRS 1	NEM	1.6 km	MPC · JPL
779652	2011 UU_{467}	—	October 22, 2011	Mount Lemmon	Mount Lemmon Survey	·	1.1 km	MPC · JPL
779653	2011 UW_{467}	—	October 27, 2011	Mount Lemmon	Mount Lemmon Survey	·	1.4 km	MPC · JPL
779654	2011 UO_{468}	—	October 20, 2011	Mount Lemmon	Mount Lemmon Survey	EOS	1.5 km	MPC · JPL
779655	2011 UW_{468}	—	October 23, 2011	Mount Lemmon	Mount Lemmon Survey	·	1.1 km	MPC · JPL
779656	2011 UP_{469}	—	October 24, 2011	Haleakala	Pan-STARRS 1	·	1.4 km	MPC · JPL
779657	2011 UB_{470}	—	October 22, 2011	Mount Lemmon	Mount Lemmon Survey	·	1.1 km	MPC · JPL
779658	2011 UH_{470}	—	October 26, 2011	Haleakala	Pan-STARRS 1	·	890 m	MPC · JPL
779659	2011 UH_{471}	—	October 26, 2011	Haleakala	Pan-STARRS 1	·	960 m	MPC · JPL
779660	2011 UK_{473}	—	October 26, 2011	Haleakala	Pan-STARRS 1	·	2.2 km	MPC · JPL
779661	2011 UL_{473}	—	October 24, 2011	Mount Lemmon	Mount Lemmon Survey	·	2.1 km	MPC · JPL
779662	2011 UO_{473}	—	October 19, 2011	Mount Lemmon	Mount Lemmon Survey	·	2.0 km	MPC · JPL
779663	2011 UX_{476}	—	October 20, 2011	Mount Lemmon	Mount Lemmon Survey	·	2.1 km	MPC · JPL
779664	2011 UN_{478}	—	October 24, 2011	Haleakala	Pan-STARRS 1	·	2.5 km	MPC · JPL
779665	2011 UC_{480}	—	October 25, 2011	Haleakala	Pan-STARRS 1	EOS	1.2 km	MPC · JPL
779666	2011 UV_{480}	—	October 18, 2011	Mount Lemmon	Mount Lemmon Survey	·	1.4 km	MPC · JPL
779667	2011 UW_{480}	—	October 24, 2011	Haleakala	Pan-STARRS 1	·	1.3 km	MPC · JPL
779668	2011 UF_{481}	—	December 4, 2007	Mount Lemmon	Mount Lemmon Survey	EUN	740 m	MPC · JPL
779669	2011 UK_{484}	—	October 20, 2011	Mount Lemmon	Mount Lemmon Survey	·	1.3 km	MPC · JPL
779670	2011 UF_{486}	—	October 25, 2011	Haleakala	Pan-STARRS 1	·	2.3 km	MPC · JPL
779671	2011 UV_{486}	—	October 23, 2011	Mount Lemmon	Mount Lemmon Survey	·	2.2 km	MPC · JPL
779672	2011 UD_{488}	—	October 26, 2011	Haleakala	Pan-STARRS 1	·	1.4 km	MPC · JPL
779673	2011 UJ_{488}	—	March 5, 2017	Haleakala	Pan-STARRS 1	·	760 m	MPC · JPL
779674	2011 UD_{489}	—	March 21, 2009	Kitt Peak	Spacewatch	AEO	790 m	MPC · JPL
779675	2011 UJ_{489}	—	October 23, 2011	Haleakala	Pan-STARRS 1	EUN	760 m	MPC · JPL
779676	2011 UL_{489}	—	October 19, 2011	Mount Lemmon	Mount Lemmon Survey	·	730 m	MPC · JPL
779677	2011 UR_{489}	—	October 24, 2011	Haleakala	Pan-STARRS 1	·	1.3 km	MPC · JPL
779678	2011 UX_{491}	—	October 26, 2011	Haleakala	Pan-STARRS 1	·	1.3 km	MPC · JPL
779679	2011 UP_{492}	—	October 23, 2011	Mount Lemmon	Mount Lemmon Survey	·	1.2 km	MPC · JPL
779680	2011 UH_{493}	—	October 19, 2011	Mount Lemmon	Mount Lemmon Survey	·	2.3 km	MPC · JPL
779681	2011 UW_{494}	—	October 23, 2011	Mount Lemmon	Mount Lemmon Survey	·	2.3 km	MPC · JPL
779682	2011 UN_{495}	—	October 24, 2011	Haleakala	Pan-STARRS 1	·	2.3 km	MPC · JPL
779683	2011 UO_{495}	—	October 20, 2011	Mount Lemmon	Mount Lemmon Survey	HYG	1.7 km	MPC · JPL
779684	2011 UT_{499}	—	October 24, 2011	Haleakala	Pan-STARRS 1	(10654)	2.3 km	MPC · JPL
779685	2011 UA_{502}	—	October 24, 2011	Kitt Peak	Spacewatch	·	1.2 km	MPC · JPL
779686	2011 UH_{503}	—	October 23, 2011	Haleakala	Pan-STARRS 1	·	2.2 km	MPC · JPL
779687	2011 UQ_{504}	—	October 18, 2011	Kitt Peak	Spacewatch	·	890 m	MPC · JPL
779688	2011 UR_{504}	—	October 23, 2011	Mount Lemmon	Mount Lemmon Survey	EOS	1.4 km	MPC · JPL
779689	2011 VJ_{10}	—	November 15, 2011	Mount Lemmon	Mount Lemmon Survey	·	890 m	MPC · JPL
779690	2011 VD_{11}	—	November 2, 2011	Kitt Peak	Spacewatch	·	2.2 km	MPC · JPL
779691	2011 VG_{25}	—	November 3, 2011	Mount Lemmon	Mount Lemmon Survey	·	2.3 km	MPC · JPL
779692	2011 VT_{25}	—	November 15, 2011	Mount Lemmon	Mount Lemmon Survey	·	2.9 km	MPC · JPL
779693	2011 VB_{26}	—	November 1, 2011	Mount Lemmon	Mount Lemmon Survey	·	2.3 km	MPC · JPL
779694	2011 VN_{26}	—	November 1, 2011	Mount Lemmon	Mount Lemmon Survey	·	1.1 km	MPC · JPL
779695	2011 VO_{27}	—	September 9, 2015	Haleakala	Pan-STARRS 1	·	840 m	MPC · JPL
779696	2011 VY_{29}	—	September 9, 2015	Haleakala	Pan-STARRS 1	·	1.1 km	MPC · JPL
779697	2011 VN_{30}	—	November 2, 2011	Kitt Peak	Spacewatch	·	1.2 km	MPC · JPL
779698	2011 VK_{33}	—	November 3, 2011	Mount Lemmon	Mount Lemmon Survey	·	1.2 km	MPC · JPL
779699	2011 VN_{33}	—	November 2, 2011	Mount Lemmon	Mount Lemmon Survey	EUN	710 m	MPC · JPL
779700	2011 VA_{34}	—	November 2, 2011	Kitt Peak	Spacewatch	·	890 m	MPC · JPL

== 779701–779800 ==
back to top

Designation			Discovery			Properties		Ref
Permanent	Provisional	Named after	Date	Site	Discoverer(s)	Category	Diam.	Ref
779701	2011 VQ_{34}	—	November 2, 2011	Mount Lemmon	Mount Lemmon Survey	EUN	1.1 km	MPC · JPL
779702	2011 VU_{34}	—	November 2, 2011	Mount Lemmon	Mount Lemmon Survey	EOS	1.3 km	MPC · JPL
779703	2011 VZ_{34}	—	October 25, 2011	Haleakala	Pan-STARRS 1	·	920 m	MPC · JPL
779704	2011 VQ_{35}	—	November 2, 2011	Mount Lemmon	Mount Lemmon Survey	·	2.2 km	MPC · JPL
779705	2011 VX_{37}	—	November 2, 2011	Kitt Peak	Spacewatch	·	1.8 km	MPC · JPL
779706	2011 WW_{10}	—	November 16, 2011	Mount Lemmon	Mount Lemmon Survey	·	2.1 km	MPC · JPL
779707	2011 WC_{18}	—	September 20, 2011	Kitt Peak	Spacewatch	·	2.3 km	MPC · JPL
779708	2011 WJ_{19}	—	November 2, 2011	Zelenchukskaya	T. V. Krjačko, B. Satovski	·	1.1 km	MPC · JPL
779709	2011 WR_{22}	—	November 17, 2011	Mount Lemmon	Mount Lemmon Survey	ARM	2.1 km	MPC · JPL
779710	2011 WK_{23}	—	November 17, 2011	Mount Lemmon	Mount Lemmon Survey	·	1.3 km	MPC · JPL
779711	2011 WH_{24}	—	November 17, 2011	Mount Lemmon	Mount Lemmon Survey	·	1.3 km	MPC · JPL
779712	2011 WX_{27}	—	October 25, 2011	Haleakala	Pan-STARRS 1	·	2.1 km	MPC · JPL
779713	2011 WV_{30}	—	November 22, 2011	Piszkés-tető	K. Sárneczky, A. Pál	·	2.0 km	MPC · JPL
779714	2011 WU_{35}	—	October 24, 1998	Kitt Peak	Spacewatch	(5)	920 m	MPC · JPL
779715	2011 WV_{44}	—	November 23, 2011	Mount Lemmon	Mount Lemmon Survey	·	790 m	MPC · JPL
779716	2011 WB_{45}	—	October 26, 2011	Haleakala	Pan-STARRS 1	·	1.0 km	MPC · JPL
779717	2011 WN_{49}	—	November 2, 2011	Mount Lemmon	Mount Lemmon Survey	·	1.3 km	MPC · JPL
779718	2011 WW_{53}	—	October 30, 2011	Catalina	CSS	BRG	970 m	MPC · JPL
779719	2011 WK_{57}	—	October 25, 2011	Haleakala	Pan-STARRS 1	·	3.5 km	MPC · JPL
779720	2011 WH_{58}	—	October 21, 2011	Mount Lemmon	Mount Lemmon Survey	·	820 m	MPC · JPL
779721	2011 WH_{62}	—	November 15, 2011	Kitt Peak	Spacewatch	HNS	820 m	MPC · JPL
779722	2011 WF_{70}	—	November 23, 2011	Mount Lemmon	Mount Lemmon Survey	·	970 m	MPC · JPL
779723	2011 WA_{78}	—	November 23, 2011	Mount Lemmon	Mount Lemmon Survey	·	1.2 km	MPC · JPL
779724	2011 WY_{82}	—	November 24, 2011	Haleakala	Pan-STARRS 1	·	940 m	MPC · JPL
779725	2011 WH_{83}	—	October 21, 2011	Mount Lemmon	Mount Lemmon Survey	·	870 m	MPC · JPL
779726	2011 WE_{94}	—	October 26, 2011	Haleakala	Pan-STARRS 1	·	1.7 km	MPC · JPL
779727	2011 WL_{97}	—	November 17, 2011	Mayhill-ISON	L. Elenin	·	1.3 km	MPC · JPL
779728	2011 WT_{99}	—	November 26, 2011	Mount Lemmon	Mount Lemmon Survey	·	1.1 km	MPC · JPL
779729	2011 WX_{110}	—	August 30, 2002	Kitt Peak	Spacewatch	·	950 m	MPC · JPL
779730	2011 WK_{120}	—	November 23, 2011	Mount Lemmon	Mount Lemmon Survey	(1547)	1.2 km	MPC · JPL
779731	2011 WO_{123}	—	November 17, 2011	Mount Lemmon	Mount Lemmon Survey	·	2.3 km	MPC · JPL
779732	2011 WJ_{124}	—	November 18, 2011	Mount Lemmon	Mount Lemmon Survey	·	2.5 km	MPC · JPL
779733	2011 WA_{125}	—	November 18, 2011	Mount Lemmon	Mount Lemmon Survey	·	2.0 km	MPC · JPL
779734	2011 WT_{125}	—	November 22, 2011	Mount Lemmon	Mount Lemmon Survey	T_{j} (2.97)	2.9 km	MPC · JPL
779735	2011 WV_{127}	—	October 27, 2011	Mount Lemmon	Mount Lemmon Survey	·	1.5 km	MPC · JPL
779736	2011 WS_{132}	—	November 30, 2011	Mount Lemmon	Mount Lemmon Survey	·	1.3 km	MPC · JPL
779737	2011 WT_{138}	—	October 26, 2011	Haleakala	Pan-STARRS 1	·	2.0 km	MPC · JPL
779738	2011 WA_{139}	—	October 26, 2011	Haleakala	Pan-STARRS 1	·	1.3 km	MPC · JPL
779739	2011 WF_{140}	—	November 18, 2011	Mount Lemmon	Mount Lemmon Survey	(194)	1.1 km	MPC · JPL
779740	2011 WJ_{156}	—	October 25, 2011	Haleakala	Pan-STARRS 1	·	1.0 km	MPC · JPL
779741	2011 WU_{160}	—	November 18, 2011	Catalina	CSS	·	1.1 km	MPC · JPL
779742	2011 WE_{161}	—	April 19, 2013	Haleakala	Pan-STARRS 1	·	1.2 km	MPC · JPL
779743	2011 WE_{162}	—	September 22, 2011	Kitt Peak	Spacewatch	·	2.2 km	MPC · JPL
779744	2011 WP_{162}	—	October 2, 2016	Mount Lemmon	Mount Lemmon Survey	·	2.4 km	MPC · JPL
779745	2011 WL_{164}	—	November 18, 2011	Mount Lemmon	Mount Lemmon Survey	MAR	1.4 km	MPC · JPL
779746	2011 WV_{164}	—	April 9, 2014	Mount Lemmon	Mount Lemmon Survey	·	1.5 km	MPC · JPL
779747	2011 WY_{164}	—	November 24, 2011	Mount Lemmon	Mount Lemmon Survey	·	1.2 km	MPC · JPL
779748	2011 WM_{165}	—	November 18, 2011	Mount Lemmon	Mount Lemmon Survey	·	1.1 km	MPC · JPL
779749	2011 WE_{167}	—	November 29, 2011	Mount Lemmon	Mount Lemmon Survey	·	1.2 km	MPC · JPL
779750	2011 WK_{167}	—	September 9, 2015	Haleakala	Pan-STARRS 1	·	880 m	MPC · JPL
779751	2011 WX_{167}	—	March 19, 2017	Haleakala	Pan-STARRS 1	·	1.1 km	MPC · JPL
779752	2011 WA_{168}	—	September 19, 2015	Haleakala	Pan-STARRS 1	·	1.1 km	MPC · JPL
779753	2011 WV_{168}	—	December 23, 2016	Haleakala	Pan-STARRS 1	·	1.4 km	MPC · JPL
779754	2011 WW_{168}	—	November 29, 2011	Mount Lemmon	Mount Lemmon Survey	KON	1.8 km	MPC · JPL
779755	2011 WJ_{169}	—	November 18, 2011	Mount Lemmon	Mount Lemmon Survey	·	1.0 km	MPC · JPL
779756	2011 WL_{169}	—	March 6, 2013	Haleakala	Pan-STARRS 1	·	790 m	MPC · JPL
779757	2011 WT_{169}	—	February 24, 2017	Haleakala	Pan-STARRS 1	·	860 m	MPC · JPL
779758	2011 WX_{169}	—	November 24, 2011	Mount Lemmon	Mount Lemmon Survey	·	1.1 km	MPC · JPL
779759	2011 WB_{171}	—	September 8, 2015	Haleakala	Pan-STARRS 1	·	810 m	MPC · JPL
779760	2011 WG_{172}	—	November 16, 2011	Mount Lemmon	Mount Lemmon Survey	·	2.5 km	MPC · JPL
779761	2011 WH_{172}	—	February 8, 2013	Haleakala	Pan-STARRS 1	·	2.1 km	MPC · JPL
779762	2011 WW_{172}	—	May 6, 2014	Haleakala	Pan-STARRS 1	·	1.1 km	MPC · JPL
779763	2011 WG_{173}	—	January 13, 2013	Mount Lemmon	Mount Lemmon Survey	THB	2.2 km	MPC · JPL
779764	2011 WH_{173}	—	January 31, 2017	Haleakala	Pan-STARRS 1	·	990 m	MPC · JPL
779765	2011 WS_{173}	—	October 9, 2015	Haleakala	Pan-STARRS 1	EUN	820 m	MPC · JPL
779766	2011 WX_{173}	—	October 30, 2017	Haleakala	Pan-STARRS 1	·	2.2 km	MPC · JPL
779767	2011 WZ_{174}	—	November 28, 2011	Oukaïmeden	M. Ory	(5)	990 m	MPC · JPL
779768	2011 WC_{176}	—	November 18, 2011	Mount Lemmon	Mount Lemmon Survey	·	850 m	MPC · JPL
779769	2011 WD_{176}	—	November 24, 2011	Haleakala	Pan-STARRS 1	MAR	1.1 km	MPC · JPL
779770	2011 WW_{177}	—	November 28, 2011	Kitt Peak	Spacewatch	·	1.5 km	MPC · JPL
779771	2011 WU_{179}	—	November 22, 2011	Mount Lemmon	Mount Lemmon Survey	·	1.4 km	MPC · JPL
779772	2011 WA_{180}	—	November 30, 2011	Mount Lemmon	Mount Lemmon Survey	·	1.1 km	MPC · JPL
779773	2011 WC_{183}	—	November 24, 2011	Haleakala	Pan-STARRS 1	·	2.1 km	MPC · JPL
779774	2011 WD_{184}	—	November 24, 2011	Mount Lemmon	Mount Lemmon Survey	·	1.3 km	MPC · JPL
779775	2011 WG_{184}	—	November 24, 2011	Mount Lemmon	Mount Lemmon Survey	L4	6.0 km	MPC · JPL
779776	2011 WS_{184}	—	November 24, 2011	Haleakala	Pan-STARRS 1	L4	6.5 km	MPC · JPL
779777	2011 WB_{186}	—	November 22, 2011	Mount Lemmon	Mount Lemmon Survey	·	1.3 km	MPC · JPL
779778	2011 WQ_{187}	—	November 24, 2011	Haleakala	Pan-STARRS 1	·	2.3 km	MPC · JPL
779779	2011 WP_{189}	—	November 22, 2011	Mount Lemmon	Mount Lemmon Survey	·	1.4 km	MPC · JPL
779780	2011 WH_{190}	—	November 30, 2011	Mount Lemmon	Mount Lemmon Survey	·	900 m	MPC · JPL
779781	2011 XB_{4}	—	November 25, 2011	Haleakala	Pan-STARRS 1	·	1.3 km	MPC · JPL
779782	2011 XQ_{5}	—	October 24, 2015	Haleakala	Pan-STARRS 1	(5)	880 m	MPC · JPL
779783	2011 XT_{6}	—	December 6, 2011	Haleakala	Pan-STARRS 1	·	1.3 km	MPC · JPL
779784	2011 XZ_{6}	—	December 6, 2011	Haleakala	Pan-STARRS 1	·	1.6 km	MPC · JPL
779785	2011 XO_{7}	—	December 6, 2011	Haleakala	Pan-STARRS 1	·	1.5 km	MPC · JPL
779786	2011 YU_{9}	—	November 25, 2011	Haleakala	Pan-STARRS 1	·	1.4 km	MPC · JPL
779787	2011 YY_{18}	—	December 26, 2011	Mount Lemmon	Mount Lemmon Survey	·	1.1 km	MPC · JPL
779788	2011 YB_{31}	—	December 26, 2011	Piszkéstető	K. Sárneczky	·	1.3 km	MPC · JPL
779789	2011 YK_{36}	—	February 11, 2008	Mount Lemmon	Mount Lemmon Survey	·	890 m	MPC · JPL
779790	2011 YP_{36}	—	December 26, 2011	Mount Lemmon	Mount Lemmon Survey	·	1.4 km	MPC · JPL
779791	2011 YZ_{49}	—	November 26, 2011	Mount Lemmon	Mount Lemmon Survey	·	2.8 km	MPC · JPL
779792	2011 YN_{56}	—	December 29, 2011	Kitt Peak	Spacewatch	L4	5.9 km	MPC · JPL
779793	2011 YB_{58}	—	December 29, 2011	Kitt Peak	Spacewatch	·	1.1 km	MPC · JPL
779794	2011 YE_{71}	—	December 25, 2011	Kitt Peak	Spacewatch	·	890 m	MPC · JPL
779795	2011 YY_{73}	—	January 18, 1998	Kitt Peak	Spacewatch	·	1.5 km	MPC · JPL
779796	2011 YR_{80}	—	October 1, 2010	Mount Lemmon	Mount Lemmon Survey	·	1.6 km	MPC · JPL
779797	2011 YJ_{87}	—	June 24, 2014	Haleakala	Pan-STARRS 1	·	1.6 km	MPC · JPL
779798	2011 YR_{87}	—	December 31, 2011	Mount Lemmon	Mount Lemmon Survey	EUN	930 m	MPC · JPL
779799	2011 YB_{89}	—	January 14, 2018	Haleakala	Pan-STARRS 1	LIX	2.3 km	MPC · JPL
779800	2011 YY_{89}	—	December 12, 2015	Haleakala	Pan-STARRS 1	·	1.0 km	MPC · JPL

== 779801–779900 ==
back to top

Designation			Discovery			Properties		Ref
Permanent	Provisional	Named after	Date	Site	Discoverer(s)	Category	Diam.	Ref
779801	2011 YB_{90}	—	December 27, 2011	Kitt Peak	Spacewatch	·	2.3 km	MPC · JPL
779802	2011 YD_{90}	—	December 29, 2011	Mount Lemmon	Mount Lemmon Survey	·	880 m	MPC · JPL
779803	2011 YE_{90}	—	March 7, 2017	Haleakala	Pan-STARRS 1	·	1.1 km	MPC · JPL
779804	2011 YN_{91}	—	December 28, 2011	Mount Lemmon	Mount Lemmon Survey	MAR	840 m	MPC · JPL
779805	2011 YJ_{92}	—	December 29, 2011	Kitt Peak	Spacewatch	·	950 m	MPC · JPL
779806	2011 YZ_{93}	—	December 27, 2011	Mount Lemmon	Mount Lemmon Survey	GAL	1.2 km	MPC · JPL
779807	2011 YM_{94}	—	December 29, 2011	Mount Lemmon	Mount Lemmon Survey	ADE	1.2 km	MPC · JPL
779808	2011 YP_{94}	—	December 29, 2011	Mount Lemmon	Mount Lemmon Survey	·	1.1 km	MPC · JPL
779809	2011 YQ_{95}	—	December 27, 2011	Mount Lemmon	Mount Lemmon Survey	HOF	2.0 km	MPC · JPL
779810	2011 YZ_{95}	—	December 20, 2011	ESA OGS	ESA OGS	·	810 m	MPC · JPL
779811	2011 YK_{96}	—	December 24, 2011	Mount Lemmon	Mount Lemmon Survey	·	2.8 km	MPC · JPL
779812	2011 YM_{96}	—	December 27, 2011	Mount Lemmon	Mount Lemmon Survey	EOS	1.5 km	MPC · JPL
779813	2011 YW_{96}	—	December 28, 2011	Mount Lemmon	Mount Lemmon Survey	L4	6.0 km	MPC · JPL
779814	2011 YO_{97}	—	December 29, 2011	Mount Lemmon	Mount Lemmon Survey	L4	6.2 km	MPC · JPL
779815	2011 YF_{99}	—	December 27, 2011	Mount Lemmon	Mount Lemmon Survey	·	1.2 km	MPC · JPL
779816	2011 YT_{99}	—	December 27, 2011	Les Engarouines	L. Bernasconi	L4	6.0 km	MPC · JPL
779817	2012 AD_{3}	—	January 2, 2012	Mount Lemmon	Mount Lemmon Survey	APO · PHA	430 m	MPC · JPL
779818	2012 AX_{21}	—	December 29, 2011	Mount Lemmon	Mount Lemmon Survey	·	1.1 km	MPC · JPL
779819	2012 AG_{22}	—	December 29, 2011	Mount Lemmon	Mount Lemmon Survey	·	990 m	MPC · JPL
779820	2012 AF_{28}	—	November 30, 2011	Mount Lemmon	Mount Lemmon Survey	HNS	820 m	MPC · JPL
779821	2012 AE_{30}	—	January 2, 2012	Kitt Peak	Spacewatch	BAR	1.0 km	MPC · JPL
779822	2012 AO_{30}	—	June 7, 2013	Haleakala	Pan-STARRS 1	EUN	680 m	MPC · JPL
779823	2012 AA_{31}	—	January 2, 2012	Kitt Peak	Spacewatch	·	930 m	MPC · JPL
779824	2012 AL_{32}	—	January 2, 2012	Kitt Peak	Spacewatch	L4 · ERY	6.1 km	MPC · JPL
779825	2012 AG_{33}	—	January 3, 2012	Kitt Peak	Spacewatch	L4	6.5 km	MPC · JPL
779826	2012 AK_{34}	—	January 1, 2012	Mount Lemmon	Mount Lemmon Survey	·	1.7 km	MPC · JPL
779827	2012 AP_{34}	—	January 2, 2012	Mount Lemmon	Mount Lemmon Survey	L4 · ERY	5.7 km	MPC · JPL
779828	2012 AN_{35}	—	January 1, 2012	Mount Lemmon	Mount Lemmon Survey	L4	6.5 km	MPC · JPL
779829	2012 AP_{36}	—	January 1, 2012	Mount Lemmon	Mount Lemmon Survey	L4	6.3 km	MPC · JPL
779830	2012 AO_{37}	—	January 4, 2012	Mount Lemmon	Mount Lemmon Survey	L4 · ERY	5.6 km	MPC · JPL
779831	2012 BV_{5}	—	January 2, 2012	Kitt Peak	Spacewatch	·	1.2 km	MPC · JPL
779832	2012 BA_{6}	—	January 18, 2012	Mount Lemmon	Mount Lemmon Survey	·	1.8 km	MPC · JPL
779833	2012 BL_{12}	—	January 18, 2012	Kitt Peak	Spacewatch	·	2.2 km	MPC · JPL
779834	2012 BH_{16}	—	December 28, 2011	Mount Lemmon	Mount Lemmon Survey	ADE	1.3 km	MPC · JPL
779835	2012 BK_{22}	—	January 2, 2012	Mount Lemmon	Mount Lemmon Survey	·	2.0 km	MPC · JPL
779836	2012 BW_{26}	—	January 20, 2012	Haleakala	Pan-STARRS 1	·	1.2 km	MPC · JPL
779837	2012 BE_{38}	—	September 25, 2006	Mount Lemmon	Mount Lemmon Survey	·	810 m	MPC · JPL
779838	2012 BL_{42}	—	January 19, 2012	Mount Lemmon	Mount Lemmon Survey	·	1.1 km	MPC · JPL
779839	2012 BW_{46}	—	August 29, 2014	Mount Lemmon	Mount Lemmon Survey	·	1.1 km	MPC · JPL
779840	2012 BD_{49}	—	December 27, 2011	Mount Lemmon	Mount Lemmon Survey	AGN	810 m	MPC · JPL
779841	2012 BP_{58}	—	January 18, 2012	Mount Lemmon	Mount Lemmon Survey	·	920 m	MPC · JPL
779842	2012 BP_{63}	—	February 9, 2008	Mount Lemmon	Mount Lemmon Survey	·	1.1 km	MPC · JPL
779843	2012 BM_{65}	—	January 20, 2012	Mount Lemmon	Mount Lemmon Survey	·	980 m	MPC · JPL
779844	2012 BO_{79}	—	January 27, 2012	Mount Lemmon	Mount Lemmon Survey	·	930 m	MPC · JPL
779845	2012 BN_{80}	—	January 27, 2012	Mount Lemmon	Mount Lemmon Survey	EOS	1.2 km	MPC · JPL
779846	2012 BE_{84}	—	January 27, 2012	Mount Lemmon	Mount Lemmon Survey	·	1.0 km	MPC · JPL
779847	2012 BQ_{85}	—	January 27, 2012	Mount Lemmon	Mount Lemmon Survey	(194)	1.1 km	MPC · JPL
779848	2012 BZ_{86}	—	November 18, 2007	Mount Lemmon	Mount Lemmon Survey	·	1.2 km	MPC · JPL
779849	2012 BO_{94}	—	January 27, 2012	Mount Lemmon	Mount Lemmon Survey	·	1.5 km	MPC · JPL
779850	2012 BU_{96}	—	December 29, 2011	Mount Lemmon	Mount Lemmon Survey	L4	5.8 km	MPC · JPL
779851	2012 BB_{99}	—	January 26, 2012	Haleakala	Pan-STARRS 1	DOR	1.5 km	MPC · JPL
779852	2012 BX_{101}	—	January 30, 2012	Cordell-Lorenz	D. T. Durig, Liu, Z.	MIS	2.0 km	MPC · JPL
779853	2012 BQ_{105}	—	January 24, 2012	Haleakala	Pan-STARRS 1	GEF	800 m	MPC · JPL
779854	2012 BT_{105}	—	January 24, 2012	Haleakala	Pan-STARRS 1	KON	1.8 km	MPC · JPL
779855	2012 BE_{110}	—	January 27, 2012	Mount Lemmon	Mount Lemmon Survey	(1547)	1.0 km	MPC · JPL
779856	2012 BB_{114}	—	January 27, 2012	Mount Lemmon	Mount Lemmon Survey	·	910 m	MPC · JPL
779857	2012 BF_{114}	—	January 27, 2012	Mount Lemmon	Mount Lemmon Survey	THM	1.5 km	MPC · JPL
779858	2012 BD_{115}	—	February 2, 2008	Mount Lemmon	Mount Lemmon Survey	(5)	810 m	MPC · JPL
779859	2012 BG_{123}	—	January 31, 2012	Kitt Peak	Spacewatch	·	970 m	MPC · JPL
779860	2012 BV_{132}	—	October 30, 2011	Kitt Peak	Spacewatch	(1547)	1.8 km	MPC · JPL
779861	2012 BB_{149}	—	April 4, 2008	Junk Bond	D. Healy	·	1.1 km	MPC · JPL
779862	2012 BC_{150}	—	January 30, 2012	Mount Lemmon	Mount Lemmon Survey	·	790 m	MPC · JPL
779863	2012 BH_{152}	—	January 3, 2012	Mount Lemmon	Mount Lemmon Survey	·	1.4 km	MPC · JPL
779864	2012 BW_{156}	—	January 19, 2012	Haleakala	Pan-STARRS 1	·	1.1 km	MPC · JPL
779865	2012 BM_{157}	—	January 18, 2012	Kitt Peak	Spacewatch	·	1.1 km	MPC · JPL
779866	2012 BX_{157}	—	January 19, 2012	Haleakala	Pan-STARRS 1	·	1.0 km	MPC · JPL
779867	2012 BK_{158}	—	January 19, 2012	Haleakala	Pan-STARRS 1	·	1.3 km	MPC · JPL
779868	2012 BM_{158}	—	September 26, 2006	Mount Lemmon	Mount Lemmon Survey	·	940 m	MPC · JPL
779869	2012 BY_{158}	—	January 26, 2012	Mount Lemmon	Mount Lemmon Survey	·	2.9 km	MPC · JPL
779870	2012 BZ_{158}	—	March 15, 2004	Kitt Peak	Spacewatch	·	1.0 km	MPC · JPL
779871	2012 BA_{165}	—	January 19, 2012	Haleakala	Pan-STARRS 1	·	1.0 km	MPC · JPL
779872	2012 BV_{165}	—	January 26, 2012	Mount Lemmon	Mount Lemmon Survey	L4	5.1 km	MPC · JPL
779873	2012 BT_{167}	—	December 14, 2015	Haleakala	Pan-STARRS 1	·	1.1 km	MPC · JPL
779874	2012 BH_{168}	—	January 18, 2012	Kitt Peak	Spacewatch	·	1.4 km	MPC · JPL
779875	2012 BY_{168}	—	January 19, 2012	Haleakala	Pan-STARRS 1	·	940 m	MPC · JPL
779876	2012 BH_{169}	—	November 6, 2015	Mount Lemmon	Mount Lemmon Survey	JUN	820 m	MPC · JPL
779877	2012 BU_{170}	—	January 18, 2012	Mount Lemmon	Mount Lemmon Survey	·	1.6 km	MPC · JPL
779878	2012 BJ_{171}	—	January 27, 2012	Mount Lemmon	Mount Lemmon Survey	·	1.1 km	MPC · JPL
779879	2012 BT_{171}	—	May 16, 2018	Mount Lemmon	Mount Lemmon Survey	·	1.4 km	MPC · JPL
779880	2012 BK_{172}	—	January 19, 2012	Haleakala	Pan-STARRS 1	·	1.2 km	MPC · JPL
779881	2012 BS_{172}	—	January 25, 2012	Haleakala	Pan-STARRS 1	EUN	990 m	MPC · JPL
779882	2012 BC_{174}	—	January 18, 2012	Kitt Peak	Spacewatch	HNS	720 m	MPC · JPL
779883	2012 BY_{175}	—	January 19, 2012	Mount Lemmon	Mount Lemmon Survey	·	900 m	MPC · JPL
779884	2012 BB_{178}	—	January 26, 2012	Haleakala	Pan-STARRS 1	·	1.1 km	MPC · JPL
779885	2012 BQ_{178}	—	January 29, 2012	Kitt Peak	Spacewatch	·	1.7 km	MPC · JPL
779886	2012 BP_{179}	—	January 18, 2012	Mount Lemmon	Mount Lemmon Survey	L4	6.1 km	MPC · JPL
779887	2012 BA_{181}	—	January 19, 2012	Haleakala	Pan-STARRS 1	·	1.2 km	MPC · JPL
779888	2012 BC_{181}	—	January 19, 2012	Mount Lemmon	Mount Lemmon Survey	EUN	830 m	MPC · JPL
779889	2012 BE_{181}	—	January 29, 2012	Mount Lemmon	Mount Lemmon Survey	EUN	950 m	MPC · JPL
779890	2012 BG_{181}	—	January 26, 2012	Mount Lemmon	Mount Lemmon Survey	·	1.1 km	MPC · JPL
779891	2012 BO_{181}	—	January 30, 2012	Mount Lemmon	Mount Lemmon Survey	·	1.1 km	MPC · JPL
779892	2012 BP_{181}	—	January 20, 2012	Kitt Peak	Spacewatch	ADE	1.4 km	MPC · JPL
779893	2012 BH_{182}	—	January 26, 2012	Mount Lemmon	Mount Lemmon Survey	·	1.2 km	MPC · JPL
779894	2012 BT_{182}	—	January 18, 2012	Kitt Peak	Spacewatch	·	900 m	MPC · JPL
779895	2012 BJ_{183}	—	January 18, 2012	Mount Lemmon	Mount Lemmon Survey	·	980 m	MPC · JPL
779896	2012 BR_{184}	—	January 18, 2012	Kitt Peak	Spacewatch	EUN	750 m	MPC · JPL
779897	2012 BZ_{184}	—	January 18, 2012	Mount Lemmon	Mount Lemmon Survey	L4	5.5 km	MPC · JPL
779898	2012 BG_{186}	—	December 29, 2011	Kitt Peak	Spacewatch	L4 · ERY	5.5 km	MPC · JPL
779899	2012 BC_{188}	—	January 18, 2012	Mount Lemmon	Mount Lemmon Survey	·	2.0 km	MPC · JPL
779900	2012 BC_{189}	—	January 26, 2012	Mount Lemmon	Mount Lemmon Survey	·	1.1 km	MPC · JPL

== 779901–780000 ==
back to top

Designation			Discovery			Properties		Ref
Permanent	Provisional	Named after	Date	Site	Discoverer(s)	Category	Diam.	Ref
779901	2012 BN_{189}	—	January 19, 2012	Haleakala	Pan-STARRS 1	·	1.5 km	MPC · JPL
779902	2012 CA_{2}	—	January 19, 2012	Haleakala	Pan-STARRS 1	·	1.3 km	MPC · JPL
779903	2012 CU_{6}	—	October 9, 2010	Mount Lemmon	Mount Lemmon Survey	·	1.4 km	MPC · JPL
779904	2012 CN_{9}	—	February 3, 2012	Haleakala	Pan-STARRS 1	HNS	810 m	MPC · JPL
779905	2012 CO_{11}	—	December 27, 2011	Mount Lemmon	Mount Lemmon Survey	(1547)	880 m	MPC · JPL
779906	2012 CY_{20}	—	January 19, 2012	Haleakala	Pan-STARRS 1	·	1.2 km	MPC · JPL
779907	2012 CP_{22}	—	February 13, 2012	Haleakala	Pan-STARRS 1	·	910 m	MPC · JPL
779908	2012 CB_{25}	—	February 13, 2012	Haleakala	Pan-STARRS 1	·	940 m	MPC · JPL
779909	2012 CF_{35}	—	February 3, 2012	Haleakala	Pan-STARRS 1	·	1.2 km	MPC · JPL
779910	2012 CP_{39}	—	January 26, 2012	Mount Lemmon	Mount Lemmon Survey	EOS	1.4 km	MPC · JPL
779911	2012 CY_{48}	—	March 9, 2008	Mount Lemmon	Mount Lemmon Survey	HNS	760 m	MPC · JPL
779912	2012 CB_{59}	—	February 3, 2012	Haleakala	Pan-STARRS 1	·	1.4 km	MPC · JPL
779913	2012 CC_{59}	—	February 3, 2012	Haleakala	Pan-STARRS 1	·	1.3 km	MPC · JPL
779914	2012 CH_{59}	—	March 1, 2008	Kitt Peak	Spacewatch	·	890 m	MPC · JPL
779915	2012 CP_{60}	—	February 3, 2012	Mount Lemmon	Mount Lemmon Survey	·	1.0 km	MPC · JPL
779916	2012 CY_{60}	—	April 19, 2013	Haleakala	Pan-STARRS 1	·	2.0 km	MPC · JPL
779917	2012 CU_{61}	—	February 14, 2012	Haleakala	Pan-STARRS 1	·	1.1 km	MPC · JPL
779918	2012 CO_{62}	—	February 1, 2012	Kitt Peak	Spacewatch	·	1.4 km	MPC · JPL
779919	2012 CQ_{63}	—	May 16, 2018	Mount Lemmon	Mount Lemmon Survey	JUN	1 km	MPC · JPL
779920	2012 CV_{63}	—	June 29, 2014	Haleakala	Pan-STARRS 1	·	1.3 km	MPC · JPL
779921	2012 CB_{64}	—	February 15, 2012	Haleakala	Pan-STARRS 1	ADE	1.3 km	MPC · JPL
779922	2012 CM_{65}	—	February 14, 2012	Haleakala	Pan-STARRS 1	·	1.1 km	MPC · JPL
779923	2012 CW_{65}	—	March 18, 2017	Mount Lemmon	Mount Lemmon Survey	·	1.3 km	MPC · JPL
779924	2012 CX_{65}	—	January 3, 2016	Mount Lemmon	Mount Lemmon Survey	·	960 m	MPC · JPL
779925	2012 CP_{66}	—	February 1, 2012	Mount Lemmon	Mount Lemmon Survey	·	950 m	MPC · JPL
779926	2012 CT_{66}	—	February 3, 2012	Haleakala	Pan-STARRS 1	·	1.3 km	MPC · JPL
779927	2012 CY_{66}	—	February 14, 2012	Haleakala	Pan-STARRS 1	·	990 m	MPC · JPL
779928	2012 CA_{67}	—	February 3, 2012	Haleakala	Pan-STARRS 1	EUN	790 m	MPC · JPL
779929	2012 CS_{68}	—	February 3, 2012	Haleakala	Pan-STARRS 1	·	1.0 km	MPC · JPL
779930	2012 CJ_{69}	—	February 3, 2012	Mount Lemmon	Mount Lemmon Survey	·	1.3 km	MPC · JPL
779931	2012 CM_{69}	—	February 3, 2012	Haleakala	Pan-STARRS 1	·	1.2 km	MPC · JPL
779932	2012 CO_{69}	—	February 1, 2012	Kitt Peak	Spacewatch	·	960 m	MPC · JPL
779933	2012 CR_{69}	—	February 1, 2012	Kitt Peak	Spacewatch	·	1.1 km	MPC · JPL
779934	2012 CA_{70}	—	January 27, 2012	Mount Lemmon	Mount Lemmon Survey	·	970 m	MPC · JPL
779935	2012 CJ_{71}	—	February 11, 2012	Mount Lemmon	Mount Lemmon Survey	·	2.0 km	MPC · JPL
779936	2012 CL_{71}	—	February 15, 2012	Haleakala	Pan-STARRS 1	HNS	640 m	MPC · JPL
779937	2012 CQ_{71}	—	February 15, 2012	Haleakala	Pan-STARRS 1	·	1.9 km	MPC · JPL
779938	2012 CE_{72}	—	February 3, 2012	Haleakala	Pan-STARRS 1	·	810 m	MPC · JPL
779939	2012 CN_{73}	—	February 1, 2012	Kitt Peak	Spacewatch	KOR	950 m	MPC · JPL
779940	2012 CC_{74}	—	February 14, 2012	Haleakala	Pan-STARRS 1	HOF	1.7 km	MPC · JPL
779941	2012 CE_{74}	—	February 4, 2012	Haleakala	Pan-STARRS 1	·	1.4 km	MPC · JPL
779942	2012 CQ_{74}	—	February 14, 2012	Haleakala	Pan-STARRS 1	AGN	820 m	MPC · JPL
779943	2012 DJ_{2}	—	February 16, 2012	Haleakala	Pan-STARRS 1	·	1.3 km	MPC · JPL
779944	2012 DZ_{2}	—	April 12, 2005	Kitt Peak	Deep Ecliptic Survey	3:2 · SHU	4.1 km	MPC · JPL
779945	2012 DR_{19}	—	January 27, 2012	Mount Lemmon	Mount Lemmon Survey	JUN	870 m	MPC · JPL
779946	2012 DC_{25}	—	February 21, 2012	Kitt Peak	Spacewatch	·	1.4 km	MPC · JPL
779947	2012 DR_{46}	—	February 26, 2012	Marly	P. Kocher	·	1.2 km	MPC · JPL
779948	2012 DX_{57}	—	February 23, 1998	Kitt Peak	Spacewatch	·	1.4 km	MPC · JPL
779949	2012 DS_{60}	—	February 24, 2012	Catalina	CSS	·	1.3 km	MPC · JPL
779950	2012 DS_{63}	—	February 24, 2012	Mount Lemmon	Mount Lemmon Survey	·	1.2 km	MPC · JPL
779951	2012 DY_{64}	—	February 24, 2012	Mount Lemmon	Mount Lemmon Survey	·	1.1 km	MPC · JPL
779952	2012 DF_{69}	—	February 25, 2012	Mount Lemmon	Mount Lemmon Survey	·	1.2 km	MPC · JPL
779953	2012 DJ_{69}	—	January 21, 2012	Kitt Peak	Spacewatch	·	1.2 km	MPC · JPL
779954	2012 DN_{69}	—	February 15, 2012	Haleakala	Pan-STARRS 1	·	2.1 km	MPC · JPL
779955	2012 DG_{71}	—	January 19, 2012	Haleakala	Pan-STARRS 1	EOS	1.4 km	MPC · JPL
779956	2012 DV_{80}	—	February 24, 2012	Kitt Peak	Spacewatch	·	1.1 km	MPC · JPL
779957 Dolea	2012 DB_{86}	Dolea	February 26, 2012	Roque de los Muchachos	EURONEAR	·	1.1 km	MPC · JPL
779958	2012 DO_{87}	—	December 27, 2011	Mount Lemmon	Mount Lemmon Survey	·	1.4 km	MPC · JPL
779959	2012 DF_{91}	—	February 16, 2012	Haleakala	Pan-STARRS 1	EUN	850 m	MPC · JPL
779960	2012 DV_{96}	—	February 14, 2012	Haleakala	Pan-STARRS 1	HOF	1.5 km	MPC · JPL
779961	2012 DZ_{100}	—	April 5, 2008	Mount Lemmon	Mount Lemmon Survey	EUN	690 m	MPC · JPL
779962	2012 DF_{101}	—	February 23, 2012	Kitt Peak	Spacewatch	·	1.2 km	MPC · JPL
779963	2012 DN_{101}	—	February 24, 2012	Kitt Peak	Spacewatch	·	1.3 km	MPC · JPL
779964	2012 DR_{101}	—	August 31, 2008	Moletai	K. Černis, Zdanavicius, J.	·	3.4 km	MPC · JPL
779965	2012 DU_{101}	—	February 27, 2012	Haleakala	Pan-STARRS 1	·	1.1 km	MPC · JPL
779966	2012 DL_{102}	—	February 21, 2012	Mount Lemmon	Mount Lemmon Survey	·	1.5 km	MPC · JPL
779967	2012 DB_{103}	—	February 25, 2012	Kitt Peak	Spacewatch	·	1.4 km	MPC · JPL
779968	2012 DL_{103}	—	February 26, 2012	Haleakala	Pan-STARRS 1	·	1.2 km	MPC · JPL
779969	2012 DN_{103}	—	April 24, 2007	Kitt Peak	Spacewatch	·	1.9 km	MPC · JPL
779970	2012 DD_{105}	—	September 16, 2009	Kitt Peak	Spacewatch	ADE	1.6 km	MPC · JPL
779971	2012 DJ_{105}	—	February 28, 2012	Haleakala	Pan-STARRS 1	·	1.1 km	MPC · JPL
779972	2012 DE_{108}	—	February 21, 2012	Mount Lemmon	Mount Lemmon Survey	·	1.2 km	MPC · JPL
779973	2012 DB_{109}	—	February 27, 2012	Haleakala	Pan-STARRS 1	HNS	710 m	MPC · JPL
779974	2012 DH_{111}	—	February 27, 2012	Haleakala	Pan-STARRS 1	·	1.0 km	MPC · JPL
779975	2012 DL_{112}	—	February 28, 2012	Haleakala	Pan-STARRS 1	KOR	1.1 km	MPC · JPL
779976	2012 DN_{112}	—	February 18, 2012	Catalina	CSS	·	1.3 km	MPC · JPL
779977	2012 DP_{112}	—	July 28, 2014	Haleakala	Pan-STARRS 1	·	1.2 km	MPC · JPL
779978	2012 DF_{113}	—	February 16, 2012	Haleakala	Pan-STARRS 1	JUN	630 m	MPC · JPL
779979	2012 DW_{114}	—	February 27, 2012	Haleakala	Pan-STARRS 1	·	1.0 km	MPC · JPL
779980	2012 DN_{115}	—	February 27, 2012	Haleakala	Pan-STARRS 1	EOS	1.3 km	MPC · JPL
779981	2012 DW_{115}	—	February 20, 2012	Haleakala	Pan-STARRS 1	MAR	840 m	MPC · JPL
779982	2012 DS_{116}	—	February 28, 2012	Haleakala	Pan-STARRS 1	·	1.2 km	MPC · JPL
779983	2012 DG_{117}	—	February 23, 2012	Kitt Peak	Spacewatch	·	970 m	MPC · JPL
779984	2012 DP_{117}	—	February 25, 2012	Mount Lemmon	Mount Lemmon Survey	·	1.2 km	MPC · JPL
779985	2012 DU_{119}	—	February 26, 2012	Kitt Peak	Spacewatch	·	1.7 km	MPC · JPL
779986	2012 DQ_{120}	—	February 20, 2012	Haleakala	Pan-STARRS 1	·	2.8 km	MPC · JPL
779987	2012 DD_{121}	—	February 26, 2012	Haleakala	Pan-STARRS 1	·	1.0 km	MPC · JPL
779988	2012 DP_{123}	—	February 28, 2012	Haleakala	Pan-STARRS 1	NEM	1.7 km	MPC · JPL
779989	2012 DT_{123}	—	February 27, 2012	Haleakala	Pan-STARRS 1	·	1.3 km	MPC · JPL
779990	2012 DV_{123}	—	February 23, 2012	Mount Lemmon	Mount Lemmon Survey	·	1.1 km	MPC · JPL
779991	2012 DW_{123}	—	February 26, 2012	Mount Lemmon	Mount Lemmon Survey	·	1.2 km	MPC · JPL
779992	2012 DX_{123}	—	February 25, 2012	Mount Lemmon	Mount Lemmon Survey	·	1.0 km	MPC · JPL
779993	2012 DJ_{127}	—	February 21, 2012	Kitt Peak	Spacewatch	·	1.5 km	MPC · JPL
779994	2012 DC_{128}	—	February 28, 2012	Haleakala	Pan-STARRS 1	·	1.1 km	MPC · JPL
779995	2012 DU_{128}	—	February 26, 2012	Haleakala	Pan-STARRS 1	·	1.8 km	MPC · JPL
779996	2012 DY_{128}	—	February 27, 2012	Haleakala	Pan-STARRS 1	·	2.0 km	MPC · JPL
779997	2012 DN_{129}	—	January 23, 2006	Kitt Peak	Spacewatch	·	2.6 km	MPC · JPL
779998	2012 DV_{129}	—	February 23, 2012	Mount Lemmon	Mount Lemmon Survey	KOR	1.1 km	MPC · JPL
779999	2012 DL_{133}	—	February 23, 2012	Mount Lemmon	Mount Lemmon Survey	·	1.3 km	MPC · JPL
780000	2012 EN_{1}	—	February 22, 2012	Kitt Peak	Spacewatch	·	1.4 km	MPC · JPL

back to top

== Meaning of names ==
As minor planet discoveries are confirmed, they are given a permanent number by the IAU's Minor Planet Center (MPC), and the discoverers can then submit names for them, following the IAU's naming conventions. The list below concerns those minor planets in the specified number-range that have received names, and explains the meanings of those names.

Official naming citations of newly named small Solar System bodies are approved and published in a bulletin by IAU's Working Group for Small Bodies Nomenclature (WGSBN). Before May 2021, citations were published in MPC's Minor Planet Circulars for many decades. Recent citations can also be found on the JPL Small-Body Database (SBDB). Until his death in 2016, German astronomer Lutz D. Schmadel compiled these citations into the Dictionary of Minor Planet Names (DMP) and regularly updated the collection.

Based on Paul Herget's The Names of the Minor Planets, Schmadel also researched the unclear origin of numerous asteroids, most of which had been named prior to World War II. This article incorporates text from this source, which is in the public domain: SBDB New namings may only be added to this list below after official publication as the preannouncement of names is condemned. The WGSBN publishes a comprehensive guideline for the naming rules of non-cometary small Solar System bodies.

Named minor planet	Provisional	This minor planet was named for...	Ref · Catalog
779957 Dolea	2012 DB_{86}	Paul Dolea, Romanian physicist working in space sciences and technologies at the Technical University of Cluj-Napoca.	IAU · 779957
