= List of minor planets: 864001–865000 =

The following is a partial list of minor planets, running from minor-planet number 864001 through 865000, inclusive. The primary data for this and other partial lists is based on JPL's "Small-Body Orbital Elements" and data available from the Minor Planet Center. Critical list information is also provided by the MPC, unless otherwise specified from Lowell Observatory. A detailed description of the table's columns and additional sources are given on the main page including a complete list of every page in this series, and a statistical break-up on the dynamical classification of minor planets.

Also see the summary list of all named bodies in numerical and alphabetical order, and the corresponding naming citations for the number range of this particular list. New namings may only be added to this list after official publication, as the preannouncement of names is condemned by the Working Group for Small Bodies Nomenclature of the International Astronomical Union.

Near-Earth obj.	MBA (inner)	MBA (outer)	Centaur
Mars-crosser	MBA (middle)	Jupiter trojan	Trans-Neptunian obj.
Unclassified

== 864001–864100 ==
Designation			Discovery			Properties		Ref
Permanent	Provisional	Named after	Date	Site	Discoverer(s)	Category	Diam.	Ref
864001	2014 WJ_{234}	—	January 10, 2011	Mount Lemmon	Mount Lemmon Survey	JUN	770 m	MPC; JPL
864002	2014 WH_{237}	—	November 20, 2014	Mount Lemmon	Mount Lemmon Survey	·	1.7 km	MPC; JPL
864003	2014 WV_{237}	—	September 2, 2014	Haleakala	Pan-STARRS 1	V	460 m	MPC; JPL
864004	2014 WC_{238}	—	September 28, 2003	Kitt Peak	Spacewatch	·	1.7 km	MPC; JPL
864005	2014 WL_{238}	—	November 20, 2014	Haleakala	Pan-STARRS 1	·	1.0 km	MPC; JPL
864006	2014 WT_{240}	—	September 4, 2014	Haleakala	Pan-STARRS 1	·	2.0 km	MPC; JPL
864007	2014 WC_{241}	—	January 15, 2004	Kitt Peak	Spacewatch	THB	2.0 km	MPC; JPL
864008	2014 WL_{241}	—	May 12, 2012	Mount Lemmon	Mount Lemmon Survey	·	2.8 km	MPC; JPL
864009	2014 WQ_{241}	—	September 20, 2014	Haleakala	Pan-STARRS 1	THB	2.1 km	MPC; JPL
864010	2014 WZ_{241}	—	November 21, 2014	Kitt Peak	Spacewatch	H	400 m	MPC; JPL
864011	2014 WM_{242}	—	August 30, 2014	Mount Lemmon	Mount Lemmon Survey	·	1.7 km	MPC; JPL
864012	2014 WC_{245}	—	August 22, 2014	Haleakala	Pan-STARRS 1	THB	1.8 km	MPC; JPL
864013	2014 WO_{245}	—	September 24, 2014	Haleakala	Pan-STARRS 1	·	2.2 km	MPC; JPL
864014	2014 WZ_{245}	—	September 28, 2003	Kitt Peak	Spacewatch	·	880 m	MPC; JPL
864015	2014 WH_{247}	—	September 6, 2014	Mount Lemmon	Mount Lemmon Survey	·	900 m	MPC; JPL
864016	2014 WT_{247}	—	October 1, 2014	Haleakala	Pan-STARRS 1	·	2.1 km	MPC; JPL
864017	2014 WG_{249}	—	October 2, 2014	Mount Lemmon	Mount Lemmon Survey	·	1.9 km	MPC; JPL
864018	2014 WH_{249}	—	August 12, 2013	Haleakala	Pan-STARRS 1	VER	2.1 km	MPC; JPL
864019	2014 WL_{254}	—	September 20, 2014	Haleakala	Pan-STARRS 1	·	1.7 km	MPC; JPL
864020	2014 WM_{255}	—	November 21, 2014	Haleakala	Pan-STARRS 1	·	1.5 km	MPC; JPL
864021	2014 WS_{256}	—	December 27, 2011	Mount Lemmon	Mount Lemmon Survey	·	500 m	MPC; JPL
864022	2014 WV_{256}	—	November 21, 2014	Haleakala	Pan-STARRS 1	ERI	1 km	MPC; JPL
864023	2014 WK_{257}	—	November 21, 2014	Haleakala	Pan-STARRS 1	·	2.2 km	MPC; JPL
864024	2014 WL_{257}	—	October 18, 2014	Kitt Peak	Spacewatch	·	1.8 km	MPC; JPL
864025	2014 WS_{257}	—	November 16, 2014	Mount Lemmon	Mount Lemmon Survey	·	2.7 km	MPC; JPL
864026	2014 WF_{258}	—	October 30, 2014	Kitt Peak	Spacewatch	HYG	1.6 km	MPC; JPL
864027	2014 WC_{260}	—	September 20, 2014	Haleakala	Pan-STARRS 1	·	2.1 km	MPC; JPL
864028	2014 WM_{260}	—	November 21, 2014	Haleakala	Pan-STARRS 1	·	1.9 km	MPC; JPL
864029	2014 WP_{260}	—	September 4, 2014	Haleakala	Pan-STARRS 1	·	860 m	MPC; JPL
864030	2014 WT_{263}	—	November 21, 2014	Haleakala	Pan-STARRS 1	·	690 m	MPC; JPL
864031	2014 WM_{266}	—	October 28, 2010	Mount Lemmon	Mount Lemmon Survey	PHO	590 m	MPC; JPL
864032	2014 WN_{267}	—	August 9, 2013	Haleakala	Pan-STARRS 1	·	2.0 km	MPC; JPL
864033	2014 WT_{267}	—	November 21, 2014	Haleakala	Pan-STARRS 1	·	1.8 km	MPC; JPL
864034	2014 WP_{270}	—	September 28, 2009	Mount Lemmon	Mount Lemmon Survey	·	1.2 km	MPC; JPL
864035	2014 WG_{273}	—	November 20, 2000	Kitt Peak	Spacewatch	H	330 m	MPC; JPL
864036	2014 WX_{273}	—	February 1, 2012	Kitt Peak	Spacewatch	·	570 m	MPC; JPL
864037	2014 WP_{274}	—	September 20, 2014	Haleakala	Pan-STARRS 1	·	2.3 km	MPC; JPL
864038	2014 WL_{275}	—	September 20, 2014	Haleakala	Pan-STARRS 1	·	2.4 km	MPC; JPL
864039	2014 WO_{278}	—	November 21, 2014	Haleakala	Pan-STARRS 1	·	400 m	MPC; JPL
864040	2014 WF_{279}	—	November 21, 2014	Haleakala	Pan-STARRS 1	·	850 m	MPC; JPL
864041	2014 WZ_{280}	—	November 21, 2014	Haleakala	Pan-STARRS 1	(5)	790 m	MPC; JPL
864042	2014 WW_{285}	—	November 21, 2014	Haleakala	Pan-STARRS 1	·	430 m	MPC; JPL
864043	2014 WQ_{287}	—	November 21, 2014	Haleakala	Pan-STARRS 1	T_{j} (2.95) · EUP	2.4 km	MPC; JPL
864044	2014 WP_{289}	—	November 21, 2014	Haleakala	Pan-STARRS 1	·	2.1 km	MPC; JPL
864045	2014 WC_{291}	—	October 5, 2008	La Sagra	OAM	T_{j} (2.94)	2.5 km	MPC; JPL
864046	2014 WB_{292}	—	November 21, 2014	Haleakala	Pan-STARRS 1	·	1.6 km	MPC; JPL
864047	2014 WT_{292}	—	November 21, 2014	Haleakala	Pan-STARRS 1	·	2.1 km	MPC; JPL
864048	2014 WF_{293}	—	November 21, 2014	Haleakala	Pan-STARRS 1	·	1.3 km	MPC; JPL
864049	2014 WD_{295}	—	November 21, 2014	Haleakala	Pan-STARRS 1	·	2.3 km	MPC; JPL
864050	2014 WN_{299}	—	August 28, 2014	Haleakala	Pan-STARRS 1	·	2.1 km	MPC; JPL
864051	2014 WT_{300}	—	July 27, 2014	Haleakala	Pan-STARRS 1	CLO	1.6 km	MPC; JPL
864052	2014 WB_{303}	—	October 28, 2014	Haleakala	Pan-STARRS 1	·	2.1 km	MPC; JPL
864053	2014 WC_{304}	—	October 16, 2014	Nogales	M. Schwartz, P. R. Holvorcem	·	900 m	MPC; JPL
864054	2014 WL_{304}	—	September 17, 2010	Mount Lemmon	Mount Lemmon Survey	·	890 m	MPC; JPL
864055	2014 WE_{306}	—	October 30, 2014	Mount Lemmon	Mount Lemmon Survey	L5	6.7 km	MPC; JPL
864056	2014 WC_{308}	—	October 30, 2008	Mount Lemmon	Mount Lemmon Survey	·	2.0 km	MPC; JPL
864057	2014 WM_{308}	—	October 7, 2008	Mount Lemmon	Mount Lemmon Survey	T_{j} (2.97)	3.3 km	MPC; JPL
864058	2014 WJ_{310}	—	November 9, 2009	Kitt Peak	Spacewatch	·	1.6 km	MPC; JPL
864059	2014 WA_{312}	—	November 4, 2014	Mount Lemmon	Mount Lemmon Survey	·	830 m	MPC; JPL
864060	2014 WB_{312}	—	October 1, 2014	Haleakala	Pan-STARRS 1	·	860 m	MPC; JPL
864061	2014 WG_{312}	—	August 6, 2014	Haleakala	Pan-STARRS 1	·	540 m	MPC; JPL
864062	2014 WS_{312}	—	October 1, 2014	Haleakala	Pan-STARRS 1	·	1.0 km	MPC; JPL
864063	2014 WX_{314}	—	February 14, 2012	Haleakala	Pan-STARRS 1	V	450 m	MPC; JPL
864064	2014 WY_{315}	—	August 30, 2014	Haleakala	Pan-STARRS 1	LIX	2.2 km	MPC; JPL
864065	2014 WZ_{316}	—	October 30, 2014	Haleakala	Pan-STARRS 1	·	2.5 km	MPC; JPL
864066	2014 WG_{317}	—	October 30, 2014	Haleakala	Pan-STARRS 1	·	1.7 km	MPC; JPL
864067	2014 WP_{317}	—	November 22, 2014	Haleakala	Pan-STARRS 1	·	1.3 km	MPC; JPL
864068	2014 WV_{320}	—	August 31, 2014	Haleakala	Pan-STARRS 1	·	2.0 km	MPC; JPL
864069	2014 WW_{321}	—	November 22, 2014	Haleakala	Pan-STARRS 1	GEF	830 m	MPC; JPL
864070	2014 WB_{325}	—	October 29, 2014	Haleakala	Pan-STARRS 1	TIR	2.0 km	MPC; JPL
864071	2014 WH_{326}	—	January 11, 2010	Kitt Peak	Spacewatch	·	1.9 km	MPC; JPL
864072	2014 WY_{326}	—	October 29, 2014	Haleakala	Pan-STARRS 1	·	2.4 km	MPC; JPL
864073	2014 WU_{327}	—	October 29, 2014	Haleakala	Pan-STARRS 1	·	2.0 km	MPC; JPL
864074	2014 WY_{327}	—	November 22, 2014	Haleakala	Pan-STARRS 1	·	2.0 km	MPC; JPL
864075	2014 WE_{332}	—	November 22, 2014	Haleakala	Pan-STARRS 1	·	2.4 km	MPC; JPL
864076	2014 WW_{332}	—	September 24, 2008	Kitt Peak	Spacewatch	·	1.9 km	MPC; JPL
864077	2014 WJ_{333}	—	August 31, 2014	Haleakala	Pan-STARRS 1	·	1.8 km	MPC; JPL
864078	2014 WY_{333}	—	August 31, 2014	Haleakala	Pan-STARRS 1	·	2.4 km	MPC; JPL
864079	2014 WB_{336}	—	August 30, 2013	Haleakala	Pan-STARRS 1	·	2.1 km	MPC; JPL
864080	2014 WX_{336}	—	November 22, 2014	Haleakala	Pan-STARRS 1	·	2.5 km	MPC; JPL
864081	2014 WW_{337}	—	October 6, 2008	Mount Lemmon	Mount Lemmon Survey	·	1.9 km	MPC; JPL
864082	2014 WM_{338}	—	November 22, 2014	Haleakala	Pan-STARRS 1	·	2.1 km	MPC; JPL
864083	2014 WF_{339}	—	September 6, 2008	Mount Lemmon	Mount Lemmon Survey	·	1.7 km	MPC; JPL
864084	2014 WO_{342}	—	September 5, 2008	Kitt Peak	Spacewatch	·	2.0 km	MPC; JPL
864085	2014 WD_{345}	—	October 29, 2014	Haleakala	Pan-STARRS 1	LIX	2.0 km	MPC; JPL
864086	2014 WJ_{345}	—	November 22, 2014	Haleakala	Pan-STARRS 1	·	800 m	MPC; JPL
864087	2014 WP_{345}	—	September 6, 2014	Mount Lemmon	Mount Lemmon Survey	·	1.8 km	MPC; JPL
864088	2014 WY_{346}	—	October 30, 2014	Mount Lemmon	Mount Lemmon Survey	·	1.0 km	MPC; JPL
864089	2014 WD_{348}	—	November 22, 2014	Haleakala	Pan-STARRS 1	(1118)	2.2 km	MPC; JPL
864090	2014 WZ_{348}	—	November 22, 2014	Haleakala	Pan-STARRS 1	·	520 m	MPC; JPL
864091	2014 WP_{350}	—	September 11, 2010	Socorro	LINEAR	·	950 m	MPC; JPL
864092	2014 WU_{351}	—	November 23, 2014	Haleakala	Pan-STARRS 1	·	1.6 km	MPC; JPL
864093	2014 WV_{352}	—	November 23, 2014	Haleakala	Pan-STARRS 1	·	2.5 km	MPC; JPL
864094	2014 WU_{353}	—	November 23, 2014	Haleakala	Pan-STARRS 1	H	350 m	MPC; JPL
864095	2014 WO_{356}	—	December 1, 2003	Kitt Peak	Spacewatch	TIR	2.2 km	MPC; JPL
864096	2014 WK_{360}	—	October 27, 2008	Mount Lemmon	Mount Lemmon Survey	·	2.9 km	MPC; JPL
864097	2014 WG_{361}	—	January 15, 2010	Kitt Peak	Spacewatch	THB	1.9 km	MPC; JPL
864098	2014 WH_{363}	—	November 25, 2014	Haleakala	Pan-STARRS 1	·	1.3 km	MPC; JPL
864099	2014 WT_{364}	—	November 22, 2014	Haleakala	Pan-STARRS 1	H	370 m	MPC; JPL
864100	2014 WG_{366}	—	November 23, 2014	Haleakala	Pan-STARRS 1	H	420 m	MPC; JPL

== 864101–864200 ==
back to top

Designation			Discovery			Properties		Ref
Permanent	Provisional	Named after	Date	Site	Discoverer(s)	Category	Diam.	Ref
864101	2014 WL_{368}	—	April 29, 2011	Kitt Peak	Spacewatch	AMO	420 m	MPC; JPL
864102	2014 WO_{368}	—	August 26, 2005	Palomar	NEAT	·	1.1 km	MPC; JPL
864103	2014 WA_{369}	—	November 26, 2014	Mount Lemmon	Mount Lemmon Survey	L5	8.4 km	MPC; JPL
864104	2014 WJ_{369}	—	November 27, 2014	Mount Lemmon	Mount Lemmon Survey	H	470 m	MPC; JPL
864105	2014 WQ_{369}	—	November 27, 2014	Haleakala	Pan-STARRS 1	H	370 m	MPC; JPL
864106	2014 WW_{369}	—	November 29, 2014	Haleakala	Pan-STARRS 1	·	370 m	MPC; JPL
864107	2014 WE_{370}	—	November 27, 2014	Mount Lemmon	Mount Lemmon Survey	H	480 m	MPC; JPL
864108	2014 WD_{371}	—	December 20, 2001	Palomar	NEAT	·	1.6 km	MPC; JPL
864109	2014 WT_{372}	—	September 4, 2007	Mount Lemmon	Mount Lemmon Survey	(260)	2.4 km	MPC; JPL
864110	2014 WA_{373}	—	November 22, 2014	Mount Lemmon	Mount Lemmon Survey	EOS	1.4 km	MPC; JPL
864111	2014 WC_{379}	—	November 22, 2014	Haleakala	Pan-STARRS 1	·	2.2 km	MPC; JPL
864112	2014 WP_{381}	—	October 4, 2014	Haleakala	Pan-STARRS 1	·	2.4 km	MPC; JPL
864113	2014 WR_{381}	—	October 4, 2014	Haleakala	Pan-STARRS 1	·	1.7 km	MPC; JPL
864114	2014 WA_{382}	—	November 22, 2014	Haleakala	Pan-STARRS 1	·	890 m	MPC; JPL
864115	2014 WJ_{383}	—	October 26, 2014	Haleakala	Pan-STARRS 1	·	770 m	MPC; JPL
864116	2014 WO_{384}	—	November 23, 2014	Mount Lemmon	Mount Lemmon Survey	THB	2.0 km	MPC; JPL
864117	2014 WY_{387}	—	October 5, 2014	Mount Lemmon	Mount Lemmon Survey	·	480 m	MPC; JPL
864118	2014 WB_{389}	—	November 23, 2014	Haleakala	Pan-STARRS 1	·	2.2 km	MPC; JPL
864119	2014 WF_{390}	—	November 24, 2014	Mount Lemmon	Mount Lemmon Survey	·	2.3 km	MPC; JPL
864120	2014 WE_{391}	—	November 24, 2014	Mount Lemmon	Mount Lemmon Survey	·	2.0 km	MPC; JPL
864121	2014 WF_{391}	—	November 24, 2014	Mount Lemmon	Mount Lemmon Survey	·	2.2 km	MPC; JPL
864122	2014 WJ_{391}	—	October 9, 2008	Mount Lemmon	Mount Lemmon Survey	LIX	2.0 km	MPC; JPL
864123	2014 WM_{392}	—	October 22, 2003	Kitt Peak	Spacewatch	·	730 m	MPC; JPL
864124	2014 WX_{394}	—	October 4, 2014	Mount Lemmon	Mount Lemmon Survey	·	1.8 km	MPC; JPL
864125	2014 WL_{396}	—	September 30, 2003	Kitt Peak	Spacewatch	·	1.8 km	MPC; JPL
864126	2014 WY_{396}	—	October 30, 2014	Mount Lemmon	Mount Lemmon Survey	·	540 m	MPC; JPL
864127	2014 WE_{397}	—	August 25, 2014	Haleakala	Pan-STARRS 1	·	1.7 km	MPC; JPL
864128	2014 WS_{397}	—	October 30, 2014	Haleakala	Pan-STARRS 1	·	2.1 km	MPC; JPL
864129	2014 WZ_{397}	—	October 21, 2014	Catalina	CSS	PHO	670 m	MPC; JPL
864130	2014 WU_{402}	—	November 19, 2014	Catalina	CSS	H	600 m	MPC; JPL
864131	2014 WM_{403}	—	January 4, 2011	Mount Lemmon	Mount Lemmon Survey	(5)	860 m	MPC; JPL
864132	2014 WH_{405}	—	November 26, 2014	Haleakala	Pan-STARRS 1	·	1.6 km	MPC; JPL
864133	2014 WG_{409}	—	October 2, 2010	Kitt Peak	Spacewatch	MAS	480 m	MPC; JPL
864134	2014 WF_{410}	—	November 26, 2014	Haleakala	Pan-STARRS 1	·	2.1 km	MPC; JPL
864135	2014 WS_{414}	—	November 26, 2014	Haleakala	Pan-STARRS 1	·	720 m	MPC; JPL
864136	2014 WO_{415}	—	September 23, 2008	Mount Lemmon	Mount Lemmon Survey	·	1.8 km	MPC; JPL
864137	2014 WR_{415}	—	November 26, 2014	Haleakala	Pan-STARRS 1	·	2.4 km	MPC; JPL
864138	2014 WT_{415}	—	July 14, 2013	Haleakala	Pan-STARRS 1	·	1.8 km	MPC; JPL
864139	2014 WG_{416}	—	November 26, 2014	Haleakala	Pan-STARRS 1	·	990 m	MPC; JPL
864140	2014 WM_{417}	—	November 26, 2014	Haleakala	Pan-STARRS 1	V	500 m	MPC; JPL
864141	2014 WO_{417}	—	November 26, 2014	Haleakala	Pan-STARRS 1	·	1.8 km	MPC; JPL
864142	2014 WP_{420}	—	November 26, 2014	Haleakala	Pan-STARRS 1	·	980 m	MPC; JPL
864143	2014 WZ_{421}	—	January 23, 2011	Mount Lemmon	Mount Lemmon Survey	·	980 m	MPC; JPL
864144	2014 WA_{422}	—	September 28, 2006	Kitt Peak	Spacewatch	·	870 m	MPC; JPL
864145	2014 WF_{424}	—	November 26, 2014	Haleakala	Pan-STARRS 1	·	700 m	MPC; JPL
864146	2014 WK_{424}	—	February 2, 2011	Piszkés-tető	K. Sárneczky, Z. Kuli	·	860 m	MPC; JPL
864147	2014 WC_{430}	—	November 4, 2014	Mount Lemmon	Mount Lemmon Survey	·	2.1 km	MPC; JPL
864148	2014 WR_{430}	—	April 10, 2013	Haleakala	Pan-STARRS 1	·	950 m	MPC; JPL
864149	2014 WW_{431}	—	July 16, 2004	Campo Imperatore	CINEOS	·	540 m	MPC; JPL
864150	2014 WE_{433}	—	November 27, 2014	Mount Lemmon	Mount Lemmon Survey	·	760 m	MPC; JPL
864151	2014 WK_{443}	—	October 31, 2014	Mount Lemmon	Mount Lemmon Survey	·	970 m	MPC; JPL
864152	2014 WQ_{443}	—	November 27, 2014	Haleakala	Pan-STARRS 1	VER	2.1 km	MPC; JPL
864153	2014 WP_{445}	—	October 1, 2010	Kitt Peak	Spacewatch	NYS	770 m	MPC; JPL
864154	2014 WR_{445}	—	November 27, 2014	Haleakala	Pan-STARRS 1	·	580 m	MPC; JPL
864155	2014 WT_{445}	—	October 16, 2014	Mount Lemmon	Mount Lemmon Survey	·	2.4 km	MPC; JPL
864156	2014 WX_{446}	—	September 14, 2010	Kitt Peak	Spacewatch	·	840 m	MPC; JPL
864157	2014 WY_{446}	—	November 1, 2008	Mount Lemmon	Mount Lemmon Survey	URS	2.7 km	MPC; JPL
864158	2014 WE_{448}	—	November 14, 2014	Kitt Peak	Spacewatch	·	570 m	MPC; JPL
864159	2014 WJ_{449}	—	November 27, 2014	Haleakala	Pan-STARRS 1	·	1.0 km	MPC; JPL
864160	2014 WO_{449}	—	November 27, 2014	Haleakala	Pan-STARRS 1	·	2.3 km	MPC; JPL
864161	2014 WG_{450}	—	November 22, 2014	Mount Lemmon	Mount Lemmon Survey	·	1.9 km	MPC; JPL
864162	2014 WV_{455}	—	January 8, 2010	Kitt Peak	Spacewatch	TIR	1.8 km	MPC; JPL
864163	2014 WH_{456}	—	September 4, 2014	Haleakala	Pan-STARRS 1	·	1.8 km	MPC; JPL
864164	2014 WX_{456}	—	November 17, 2014	Haleakala	Pan-STARRS 1	·	480 m	MPC; JPL
864165	2014 WE_{458}	—	September 28, 2008	Mount Lemmon	Mount Lemmon Survey	·	2.1 km	MPC; JPL
864166	2014 WM_{462}	—	November 27, 2014	Haleakala	Pan-STARRS 1	·	1.0 km	MPC; JPL
864167	2014 WH_{463}	—	November 17, 2014	Haleakala	Pan-STARRS 1	·	1.9 km	MPC; JPL
864168	2014 WL_{463}	—	October 10, 2008	Mount Lemmon	Mount Lemmon Survey	·	1.9 km	MPC; JPL
864169	2014 WU_{466}	—	November 16, 2003	Kitt Peak	Spacewatch	·	780 m	MPC; JPL
864170	2014 WW_{469}	—	October 29, 2014	Kitt Peak	Spacewatch	·	410 m	MPC; JPL
864171	2014 WF_{471}	—	November 22, 2014	Mount Lemmon	Mount Lemmon Survey	L5	7.4 km	MPC; JPL
864172	2014 WU_{471}	—	November 24, 2014	Kitt Peak	Spacewatch	·	770 m	MPC; JPL
864173	2014 WK_{473}	—	November 21, 2014	Haleakala	Pan-STARRS 1	·	1.7 km	MPC; JPL
864174	2014 WA_{476}	—	September 9, 2007	Mount Lemmon	Mount Lemmon Survey	·	470 m	MPC; JPL
864175	2014 WL_{476}	—	August 1, 2009	Kitt Peak	Spacewatch	·	1.2 km	MPC; JPL
864176	2014 WM_{476}	—	November 28, 2014	Haleakala	Pan-STARRS 1	·	650 m	MPC; JPL
864177	2014 WX_{477}	—	November 28, 2014	Haleakala	Pan-STARRS 1	PHO	800 m	MPC; JPL
864178	2014 WC_{478}	—	November 28, 2014	Haleakala	Pan-STARRS 1	·	1.9 km	MPC; JPL
864179	2014 WK_{486}	—	October 10, 2010	Mount Lemmon	Mount Lemmon Survey	·	860 m	MPC; JPL
864180	2014 WW_{488}	—	October 31, 2014	Mount Lemmon	Mount Lemmon Survey	·	410 m	MPC; JPL
864181	2014 WK_{489}	—	November 18, 2014	Haleakala	Pan-STARRS 1	H	480 m	MPC; JPL
864182	2014 WL_{493}	—	November 25, 2014	Haleakala	Pan-STARRS 1	·	1.9 km	MPC; JPL
864183	2014 WQ_{497}	—	August 28, 2006	Catalina	CSS	MAS	590 m	MPC; JPL
864184	2014 WJ_{499}	—	September 18, 2014	Haleakala	Pan-STARRS 1	·	2.2 km	MPC; JPL
864185	2014 WD_{511}	—	November 17, 2014	Haleakala	Pan-STARRS 1	L5	6.5 km	MPC; JPL
864186	2014 WG_{511}	—	November 21, 2014	Haleakala	Pan-STARRS 1	L5	6.2 km	MPC; JPL
864187	2014 WH_{511}	—	November 22, 2014	Mount Lemmon	Mount Lemmon Survey	L5	6.6 km	MPC; JPL
864188	2014 WP_{512}	—	June 9, 2013	Haleakala	Pan-STARRS 1	H	410 m	MPC; JPL
864189	2014 WZ_{512}	—	November 21, 2014	Haleakala	Pan-STARRS 1	·	770 m	MPC; JPL
864190	2014 WC_{513}	—	April 10, 2013	Catalina	CSS	H	530 m	MPC; JPL
864191	2014 WZ_{513}	—	November 21, 2014	Haleakala	Pan-STARRS 1	·	2.2 km	MPC; JPL
864192	2014 WL_{514}	—	November 22, 2014	Haleakala	Pan-STARRS 1	·	1.1 km	MPC; JPL
864193	2014 WX_{518}	—	October 27, 2008	Mount Lemmon	Mount Lemmon Survey	HYG	2.0 km	MPC; JPL
864194	2014 WZ_{518}	—	November 14, 2014	Kitt Peak	Spacewatch	·	2.3 km	MPC; JPL
864195	2014 WL_{523}	—	January 15, 2004	Kitt Peak	Spacewatch	·	830 m	MPC; JPL
864196	2014 WJ_{524}	—	September 29, 2008	Mount Lemmon	Mount Lemmon Survey	·	2.1 km	MPC; JPL
864197	2014 WJ_{526}	—	June 18, 2013	Haleakala	Pan-STARRS 1	·	2.0 km	MPC; JPL
864198	2014 WY_{526}	—	November 21, 2014	Haleakala	Pan-STARRS 1	LUT	2.7 km	MPC; JPL
864199	2014 WN_{528}	—	November 22, 2014	Haleakala	Pan-STARRS 1	·	910 m	MPC; JPL
864200	2014 WR_{528}	—	November 22, 2014	Haleakala	Pan-STARRS 1	LIX	2.2 km	MPC; JPL

== 864201–864300 ==
back to top

Designation			Discovery			Properties		Ref
Permanent	Provisional	Named after	Date	Site	Discoverer(s)	Category	Diam.	Ref
864201	2014 WW_{529}	—	November 23, 2014	Haleakala	Pan-STARRS 1	·	2.1 km	MPC; JPL
864202	2014 WO_{531}	—	August 12, 2013	Haleakala	Pan-STARRS 1	·	2.0 km	MPC; JPL
864203	2014 WX_{531}	—	February 18, 2010	Kitt Peak	Spacewatch	·	1.9 km	MPC; JPL
864204	2014 WF_{532}	—	November 27, 2014	Mount Lemmon	Mount Lemmon Survey	THB	1.8 km	MPC; JPL
864205	2014 WO_{532}	—	November 27, 2014	Haleakala	Pan-STARRS 1	·	3.2 km	MPC; JPL
864206	2014 WS_{532}	—	November 27, 2014	Haleakala	Pan-STARRS 1	·	1.9 km	MPC; JPL
864207	2014 WR_{533}	—	November 28, 2014	Haleakala	Pan-STARRS 1	·	2.3 km	MPC; JPL
864208	2014 WO_{535}	—	November 17, 2014	Haleakala	Pan-STARRS 1	·	510 m	MPC; JPL
864209	2014 WC_{537}	—	November 27, 2014	Haleakala	Pan-STARRS 1	PHO	650 m	MPC; JPL
864210	2014 WJ_{537}	—	November 28, 2014	Haleakala	Pan-STARRS 1	·	470 m	MPC; JPL
864211	2014 WS_{537}	—	November 20, 2014	Haleakala	Pan-STARRS 1	H	440 m	MPC; JPL
864212	2014 WV_{537}	—	November 19, 2014	Mount Lemmon	Mount Lemmon Survey	·	2.4 km	MPC; JPL
864213	2014 WA_{538}	—	November 26, 2014	Haleakala	Pan-STARRS 1	H	440 m	MPC; JPL
864214	2014 WV_{539}	—	November 21, 2014	Haleakala	Pan-STARRS 1	·	490 m	MPC; JPL
864215	2014 WK_{540}	—	November 20, 2014	Haleakala	Pan-STARRS 1	·	2.5 km	MPC; JPL
864216	2014 WA_{541}	—	November 16, 2014	Haleakala	Pan-STARRS 1	·	2.0 km	MPC; JPL
864217	2014 WM_{541}	—	November 22, 2014	Haleakala	Pan-STARRS 1	TEL	900 m	MPC; JPL
864218	2014 WP_{543}	—	November 26, 2014	Mount Lemmon	Mount Lemmon Survey	T_{j} (2.96)	2.6 km	MPC; JPL
864219	2014 WT_{543}	—	November 17, 2014	Haleakala	Pan-STARRS 1	EUP	3.2 km	MPC; JPL
864220	2014 WB_{544}	—	November 21, 2014	Haleakala	Pan-STARRS 1	·	1.4 km	MPC; JPL
864221	2014 WH_{544}	—	November 30, 2014	Mount Lemmon	Mount Lemmon Survey	·	2.4 km	MPC; JPL
864222	2014 WU_{544}	—	November 28, 2014	Kitt Peak	Spacewatch	·	2.0 km	MPC; JPL
864223	2014 WG_{545}	—	November 26, 2014	Haleakala	Pan-STARRS 1	ULA	3.7 km	MPC; JPL
864224	2014 WK_{545}	—	November 17, 2014	Haleakala	Pan-STARRS 1	·	2.5 km	MPC; JPL
864225	2014 WO_{545}	—	January 4, 2016	Haleakala	Pan-STARRS 1	BRA	1.2 km	MPC; JPL
864226	2014 WP_{545}	—	November 30, 2014	Mount Lemmon	Mount Lemmon Survey	·	2.4 km	MPC; JPL
864227	2014 WC_{546}	—	November 20, 2014	Haleakala	Pan-STARRS 1	·	2.1 km	MPC; JPL
864228	2014 WH_{546}	—	November 17, 2014	Mount Lemmon	Mount Lemmon Survey	·	2.0 km	MPC; JPL
864229	2014 WK_{546}	—	November 28, 2014	Haleakala	Pan-STARRS 1	·	2.3 km	MPC; JPL
864230	2014 WR_{546}	—	November 27, 2014	Haleakala	Pan-STARRS 1	EOS	1.2 km	MPC; JPL
864231	2014 WT_{546}	—	November 29, 2014	Mount Lemmon	Mount Lemmon Survey	·	1.6 km	MPC; JPL
864232	2014 WE_{547}	—	December 3, 2008	Kitt Peak	Spacewatch	·	2.5 km	MPC; JPL
864233	2014 WL_{548}	—	November 21, 2014	Haleakala	Pan-STARRS 1	·	2.3 km	MPC; JPL
864234	2014 WS_{549}	—	October 30, 2008	Mount Lemmon	Mount Lemmon Survey	THB	1.5 km	MPC; JPL
864235	2014 WV_{549}	—	May 16, 2018	Mount Lemmon	Mount Lemmon Survey	·	2.2 km	MPC; JPL
864236	2014 WT_{550}	—	November 21, 2014	Haleakala	Pan-STARRS 1	·	1.9 km	MPC; JPL
864237	2014 WZ_{551}	—	November 22, 2014	Haleakala	Pan-STARRS 1	·	1.3 km	MPC; JPL
864238	2014 WB_{552}	—	November 22, 2014	Haleakala	Pan-STARRS 1	EUP	2.2 km	MPC; JPL
864239	2014 WT_{554}	—	November 4, 2014	Mount Lemmon	Mount Lemmon Survey	·	2.4 km	MPC; JPL
864240	2014 WY_{554}	—	November 28, 2014	Mount Lemmon	Mount Lemmon Survey	·	1.3 km	MPC; JPL
864241	2014 WG_{555}	—	November 27, 2014	Mount Lemmon	Mount Lemmon Survey	·	860 m	MPC; JPL
864242	2014 WV_{555}	—	October 26, 2008	Kitt Peak	Spacewatch	·	2.3 km	MPC; JPL
864243	2014 WG_{556}	—	November 20, 2014	Haleakala	Pan-STARRS 1	·	2.7 km	MPC; JPL
864244	2014 WQ_{556}	—	November 30, 2014	Mount Lemmon	Mount Lemmon Survey	·	530 m	MPC; JPL
864245	2014 WU_{556}	—	November 16, 2014	Haleakala	Pan-STARRS 1	·	1.7 km	MPC; JPL
864246	2014 WV_{556}	—	November 21, 2014	Haleakala	Pan-STARRS 1	·	1.9 km	MPC; JPL
864247	2014 WQ_{558}	—	January 7, 2016	Haleakala	Pan-STARRS 1	·	2.4 km	MPC; JPL
864248	2014 WV_{558}	—	November 17, 2014	Kitt Peak	Spacewatch	HNS	930 m	MPC; JPL
864249	2014 WX_{558}	—	January 7, 2016	Haleakala	Pan-STARRS 1	·	2.4 km	MPC; JPL
864250	2014 WY_{558}	—	November 27, 2014	Mount Lemmon	Mount Lemmon Survey	EUP	2.8 km	MPC; JPL
864251	2014 WU_{559}	—	November 22, 2014	Haleakala	Pan-STARRS 1	EOS	1.4 km	MPC; JPL
864252	2014 WZ_{560}	—	April 14, 2010	WISE	WISE	T_{j} (2.97)	2.8 km	MPC; JPL
864253	2014 WS_{562}	—	November 27, 2014	Haleakala	Pan-STARRS 1	·	2.2 km	MPC; JPL
864254	2014 WU_{562}	—	November 21, 2014	Haleakala	Pan-STARRS 1	·	2.2 km	MPC; JPL
864255	2014 WY_{564}	—	November 16, 2014	Mount Lemmon	Mount Lemmon Survey	·	2.1 km	MPC; JPL
864256	2014 WD_{565}	—	November 22, 2014	Mount Lemmon	Mount Lemmon Survey	·	2.2 km	MPC; JPL
864257	2014 WF_{565}	—	November 17, 2014	Kitt Peak	Spacewatch	·	1.3 km	MPC; JPL
864258	2014 WM_{565}	—	November 12, 2001	Sacramento Peak	SDSS	L5	7.4 km	MPC; JPL
864259	2014 WL_{566}	—	November 20, 2014	Haleakala	Pan-STARRS 1	·	1.3 km	MPC; JPL
864260	2014 WN_{566}	—	November 23, 2014	Haleakala	Pan-STARRS 1	·	2.6 km	MPC; JPL
864261	2014 WO_{568}	—	November 26, 2014	Haleakala	Pan-STARRS 1	·	790 m	MPC; JPL
864262	2014 WR_{568}	—	November 26, 2014	Haleakala	Pan-STARRS 1	GEF	960 m	MPC; JPL
864263	2014 WK_{569}	—	November 22, 2014	Mount Lemmon	Mount Lemmon Survey	EOS	1.4 km	MPC; JPL
864264	2014 WN_{569}	—	November 28, 2014	Haleakala	Pan-STARRS 1	EUN	750 m	MPC; JPL
864265	2014 WH_{570}	—	November 20, 2014	Mount Lemmon	Mount Lemmon Survey	LIX	2.4 km	MPC; JPL
864266	2014 WL_{570}	—	November 26, 2014	Haleakala	Pan-STARRS 1	·	2.2 km	MPC; JPL
864267	2014 WA_{571}	—	November 21, 2014	Haleakala	Pan-STARRS 1	·	2.5 km	MPC; JPL
864268	2014 WO_{571}	—	November 22, 2014	Mount Lemmon	Mount Lemmon Survey	·	1.0 km	MPC; JPL
864269	2014 WV_{571}	—	November 28, 2014	Haleakala	Pan-STARRS 1	·	2.0 km	MPC; JPL
864270	2014 WF_{572}	—	November 20, 2014	Mount Lemmon	Mount Lemmon Survey	LUT	3.1 km	MPC; JPL
864271	2014 WU_{572}	—	November 28, 2014	Haleakala	Pan-STARRS 1	·	1.2 km	MPC; JPL
864272	2014 WC_{573}	—	November 20, 2014	Mount Lemmon	Mount Lemmon Survey	GAL	1.4 km	MPC; JPL
864273	2014 WH_{573}	—	November 30, 2014	Haleakala	Pan-STARRS 1	·	2.0 km	MPC; JPL
864274	2014 WK_{573}	—	November 24, 2014	Haleakala	Pan-STARRS 1	VER	1.8 km	MPC; JPL
864275	2014 WK_{574}	—	November 17, 2014	Haleakala	Pan-STARRS 1	L5	8.6 km	MPC; JPL
864276	2014 WR_{574}	—	November 20, 2014	Haleakala	Pan-STARRS 1	·	960 m	MPC; JPL
864277	2014 WJ_{575}	—	November 26, 2014	Mount Lemmon	Mount Lemmon Survey	·	1.3 km	MPC; JPL
864278	2014 WE_{577}	—	November 28, 2014	Haleakala	Pan-STARRS 1	·	1.4 km	MPC; JPL
864279	2014 WR_{578}	—	November 21, 2014	Haleakala	Pan-STARRS 1	·	910 m	MPC; JPL
864280	2014 WY_{578}	—	November 27, 2014	Haleakala	Pan-STARRS 1	L5	7.7 km	MPC; JPL
864281	2014 WE_{579}	—	November 29, 2014	Mount Lemmon	Mount Lemmon Survey	·	2.1 km	MPC; JPL
864282	2014 WF_{580}	—	November 17, 2014	Haleakala	Pan-STARRS 1	L5	6.8 km	MPC; JPL
864283	2014 WJ_{580}	—	November 21, 2014	Haleakala	Pan-STARRS 1	L5	6.2 km	MPC; JPL
864284	2014 WV_{581}	—	November 22, 2014	Haleakala	Pan-STARRS 1	·	1.2 km	MPC; JPL
864285	2014 WD_{582}	—	November 22, 2014	Mount Lemmon	Mount Lemmon Survey	·	1.2 km	MPC; JPL
864286	2014 WE_{583}	—	November 19, 2014	Haleakala	Pan-STARRS 1	·	2.5 km	MPC; JPL
864287	2014 WA_{584}	—	November 29, 2014	Mount Lemmon	Mount Lemmon Survey	·	880 m	MPC; JPL
864288	2014 WB_{584}	—	November 27, 2014	Haleakala	Pan-STARRS 1	·	1.8 km	MPC; JPL
864289	2014 WU_{585}	—	November 29, 2014	Haleakala	Pan-STARRS 1	·	1.1 km	MPC; JPL
864290	2014 WV_{585}	—	November 23, 2014	Haleakala	Pan-STARRS 1	L5	7.2 km	MPC; JPL
864291	2014 WC_{586}	—	November 17, 2014	Haleakala	Pan-STARRS 1	·	2.0 km	MPC; JPL
864292	2014 WH_{586}	—	November 17, 2014	Haleakala	Pan-STARRS 1	·	2.6 km	MPC; JPL
864293	2014 WQ_{587}	—	November 29, 2014	Haleakala	Pan-STARRS 1	·	690 m	MPC; JPL
864294	2014 WG_{588}	—	November 24, 2014	Mount Lemmon	Mount Lemmon Survey	·	780 m	MPC; JPL
864295	2014 WK_{588}	—	November 17, 2014	Mount Lemmon	Mount Lemmon Survey	·	500 m	MPC; JPL
864296	2014 WM_{588}	—	November 24, 2014	Haleakala	Pan-STARRS 1	L5	7.1 km	MPC; JPL
864297	2014 WN_{588}	—	November 16, 2014	Mount Lemmon	Mount Lemmon Survey	·	880 m	MPC; JPL
864298	2014 WO_{588}	—	November 20, 2014	Haleakala	Pan-STARRS 1	THB	1.5 km	MPC; JPL
864299	2014 WP_{588}	—	November 28, 2014	Mount Lemmon	Mount Lemmon Survey	L5	5.8 km	MPC; JPL
864300	2014 WD_{589}	—	November 27, 2014	Haleakala	Pan-STARRS 1	·	2.0 km	MPC; JPL

== 864301–864400 ==
back to top

Designation			Discovery			Properties		Ref
Permanent	Provisional	Named after	Date	Site	Discoverer(s)	Category	Diam.	Ref
864301	2014 WW_{589}	—	November 21, 2014	Haleakala	Pan-STARRS 1	·	1.4 km	MPC; JPL
864302	2014 WA_{590}	—	November 17, 2014	Haleakala	Pan-STARRS 1	·	1.1 km	MPC; JPL
864303	2014 WX_{590}	—	November 26, 2014	Haleakala	Pan-STARRS 1	VER	2.0 km	MPC; JPL
864304	2014 WJ_{592}	—	November 26, 2014	Mount Lemmon	Mount Lemmon Survey	·	2.3 km	MPC; JPL
864305	2014 WF_{593}	—	April 18, 2013	Mount Lemmon	Mount Lemmon Survey	·	1.2 km	MPC; JPL
864306	2014 WX_{593}	—	November 17, 2014	Mount Lemmon	Mount Lemmon Survey	·	990 m	MPC; JPL
864307	2014 WH_{594}	—	November 16, 2014	Mount Lemmon	Mount Lemmon Survey	·	670 m	MPC; JPL
864308	2014 WQ_{594}	—	November 26, 2014	Mount Lemmon	Mount Lemmon Survey	·	2.3 km	MPC; JPL
864309	2014 WY_{595}	—	November 23, 2014	Haleakala	Pan-STARRS 1	L5	7.1 km	MPC; JPL
864310	2014 WA_{596}	—	November 17, 2014	Mount Lemmon	Mount Lemmon Survey	·	470 m	MPC; JPL
864311	2014 WG_{596}	—	November 22, 2014	Haleakala	Pan-STARRS 1	·	430 m	MPC; JPL
864312	2014 WJ_{597}	—	November 28, 2014	Haleakala	Pan-STARRS 1	·	900 m	MPC; JPL
864313	2014 WS_{597}	—	November 26, 2014	Haleakala	Pan-STARRS 1	·	670 m	MPC; JPL
864314	2014 WL_{598}	—	November 26, 2014	Mount Lemmon	Mount Lemmon Survey	·	2.6 km	MPC; JPL
864315	2014 WQ_{598}	—	July 31, 2006	Siding Spring	SSS	·	1.0 km	MPC; JPL
864316	2014 WB_{599}	—	November 27, 2014	Haleakala	Pan-STARRS 1	·	2.2 km	MPC; JPL
864317	2014 WR_{601}	—	November 21, 2014	Haleakala	Pan-STARRS 1	PHO	650 m	MPC; JPL
864318	2014 WU_{601}	—	November 20, 2014	Haleakala	Pan-STARRS 1	·	890 m	MPC; JPL
864319	2014 WS_{602}	—	October 21, 2003	Kitt Peak	Spacewatch	MAS	500 m	MPC; JPL
864320	2014 WP_{604}	—	November 27, 2014	Haleakala	Pan-STARRS 1	·	790 m	MPC; JPL
864321	2014 WG_{605}	—	November 17, 2014	Mount Lemmon	Mount Lemmon Survey	·	520 m	MPC; JPL
864322	2014 WB_{607}	—	November 22, 2014	Mount Lemmon	Mount Lemmon Survey	·	1.4 km	MPC; JPL
864323	2014 WU_{607}	—	November 26, 2014	Mount Lemmon	Mount Lemmon Survey	ADE	1.3 km	MPC; JPL
864324	2014 WE_{608}	—	November 20, 2014	Haleakala	Pan-STARRS 1	V	480 m	MPC; JPL
864325	2014 WJ_{608}	—	November 22, 2014	Haleakala	Pan-STARRS 1	L5	6.5 km	MPC; JPL
864326	2014 WP_{608}	—	November 20, 2014	Haleakala	Pan-STARRS 1	PHO	640 m	MPC; JPL
864327	2014 WU_{609}	—	October 24, 2014	Mount Lemmon	Mount Lemmon Survey	·	680 m	MPC; JPL
864328	2014 WZ_{609}	—	November 17, 2014	Haleakala	Pan-STARRS 1	·	470 m	MPC; JPL
864329	2014 WN_{614}	—	September 29, 2008	Kitt Peak	Spacewatch	·	2.5 km	MPC; JPL
864330	2014 WN_{616}	—	November 29, 2014	Mount Lemmon	Mount Lemmon Survey	L5	7.4 km	MPC; JPL
864331	2014 WO_{616}	—	November 20, 2014	Haleakala	Pan-STARRS 1	L5	7.5 km	MPC; JPL
864332	2014 XW_{1}	—	November 21, 2014	Haleakala	Pan-STARRS 1	·	1.0 km	MPC; JPL
864333	2014 XY_{4}	—	September 7, 2008	Catalina	CSS	·	2.2 km	MPC; JPL
864334	2014 XO_{5}	—	November 27, 2014	Kitt Peak	Spacewatch	·	2.0 km	MPC; JPL
864335	2014 XT_{5}	—	November 13, 2010	Mount Lemmon	Mount Lemmon Survey	·	1.2 km	MPC; JPL
864336	2014 XG_{7}	—	December 12, 2014	Haleakala	Pan-STARRS 1	H	430 m	MPC; JPL
864337	2014 XP_{8}	—	January 4, 2011	Mount Lemmon	Mount Lemmon Survey	JUN	840 m	MPC; JPL
864338	2014 XZ_{8}	—	September 30, 2014	Mount Lemmon	Mount Lemmon Survey	TIR	2.3 km	MPC; JPL
864339	2014 XE_{10}	—	November 20, 2014	Catalina	CSS	H	650 m	MPC; JPL
864340	2014 XK_{10}	—	October 22, 2005	Kitt Peak	Spacewatch	·	1.3 km	MPC; JPL
864341	2014 XA_{13}	—	November 12, 2014	Haleakala	Pan-STARRS 1	·	2.2 km	MPC; JPL
864342	2014 XO_{15}	—	December 10, 2014	Mount Lemmon	Mount Lemmon Survey	·	1.3 km	MPC; JPL
864343	2014 XR_{15}	—	November 26, 2014	Haleakala	Pan-STARRS 1	·	2.1 km	MPC; JPL
864344	2014 XX_{15}	—	November 26, 2014	Haleakala	Pan-STARRS 1	·	2.0 km	MPC; JPL
864345	2014 XG_{16}	—	March 29, 2012	Mount Lemmon	Mount Lemmon Survey	·	560 m	MPC; JPL
864346	2014 XU_{16}	—	October 12, 2010	Bergisch Gladbach	W. Bickel	NYS	830 m	MPC; JPL
864347	2014 XJ_{17}	—	September 29, 2008	Mount Lemmon	Mount Lemmon Survey	·	2.3 km	MPC; JPL
864348	2014 XM_{17}	—	October 9, 2008	Mount Lemmon	Mount Lemmon Survey	·	2.1 km	MPC; JPL
864349	2014 XP_{18}	—	December 20, 2009	Kitt Peak	Spacewatch	·	1.9 km	MPC; JPL
864350	2014 XF_{20}	—	August 31, 2014	Haleakala	Pan-STARRS 1	·	1.9 km	MPC; JPL
864351	2014 XL_{23}	—	November 26, 2014	Haleakala	Pan-STARRS 1	THM	1.6 km	MPC; JPL
864352	2014 XE_{25}	—	December 11, 2014	Mount Lemmon	Mount Lemmon Survey	·	2.4 km	MPC; JPL
864353	2014 XY_{27}	—	October 6, 2008	Kitt Peak	Spacewatch	THM	1.6 km	MPC; JPL
864354	2014 XV_{29}	—	November 29, 2014	Mount Lemmon	Mount Lemmon Survey	·	2.1 km	MPC; JPL
864355	2014 XX_{29}	—	November 29, 2014	Mount Lemmon	Mount Lemmon Survey	·	910 m	MPC; JPL
864356	2014 XX_{30}	—	November 26, 2014	Mount Lemmon	Mount Lemmon Survey	THB	1.9 km	MPC; JPL
864357	2014 XB_{32}	—	December 15, 2014	Catalina	CSS	·	1.3 km	MPC; JPL
864358	2014 XU_{33}	—	February 27, 2012	Haleakala	Pan-STARRS 1	·	890 m	MPC; JPL
864359	2014 XM_{34}	—	September 30, 2010	Mount Lemmon	Mount Lemmon Survey	·	640 m	MPC; JPL
864360	2014 XN_{34}	—	November 27, 2014	Haleakala	Pan-STARRS 1	·	790 m	MPC; JPL
864361	2014 XT_{41}	—	December 15, 2014	Mount Lemmon	Mount Lemmon Survey	·	1.9 km	MPC; JPL
864362	2014 XF_{42}	—	December 18, 2009	Kitt Peak	Spacewatch	·	2.3 km	MPC; JPL
864363	2014 XW_{43}	—	November 12, 2010	Kitt Peak	Spacewatch	·	900 m	MPC; JPL
864364	2014 XY_{43}	—	December 11, 2014	Mount Lemmon	Mount Lemmon Survey	·	3.0 km	MPC; JPL
864365	2014 XC_{44}	—	July 13, 2013	Haleakala	Pan-STARRS 1	T_{j} (2.99)	3.0 km	MPC; JPL
864366	2014 XO_{44}	—	December 3, 2014	Haleakala	Pan-STARRS 1	·	1.1 km	MPC; JPL
864367	2014 XN_{45}	—	December 11, 2014	Mount Lemmon	Mount Lemmon Survey	·	1.9 km	MPC; JPL
864368	2014 XQ_{45}	—	December 15, 2014	Haleakala	Pan-STARRS 1	TIR	2.0 km	MPC; JPL
864369	2014 XS_{45}	—	October 29, 2005	Catalina	CSS	·	1.2 km	MPC; JPL
864370	2014 XT_{45}	—	December 10, 2014	Haleakala	Pan-STARRS 1	·	2.6 km	MPC; JPL
864371	2014 XW_{45}	—	February 10, 2016	Haleakala	Pan-STARRS 1	EOS	1.3 km	MPC; JPL
864372	2014 XE_{46}	—	September 20, 2008	Kitt Peak	Spacewatch	·	1.8 km	MPC; JPL
864373	2014 XL_{47}	—	December 10, 2014	Mount Lemmon	Mount Lemmon Survey	KON	1.7 km	MPC; JPL
864374	2014 XS_{47}	—	December 10, 2014	Mount Lemmon	Mount Lemmon Survey	·	700 m	MPC; JPL
864375	2014 XJ_{48}	—	December 1, 2014	Mount Lemmon	Mount Lemmon Survey	·	2.0 km	MPC; JPL
864376	2014 XN_{48}	—	June 17, 2018	Haleakala	Pan-STARRS 1	EOS	1.3 km	MPC; JPL
864377	2014 XG_{49}	—	November 24, 2014	Mount Lemmon	Mount Lemmon Survey	L5	6.3 km	MPC; JPL
864378	2014 XK_{51}	—	December 10, 2014	Mount Lemmon	Mount Lemmon Survey	·	1.2 km	MPC; JPL
864379	2014 XX_{52}	—	December 11, 2014	Mount Lemmon	Mount Lemmon Survey	·	2.3 km	MPC; JPL
864380	2014 XC_{53}	—	December 15, 2014	Mount Lemmon	Mount Lemmon Survey	·	750 m	MPC; JPL
864381	2014 XD_{53}	—	December 1, 2014	Mount Lemmon	Mount Lemmon Survey	·	3.0 km	MPC; JPL
864382	2014 XE_{53}	—	December 11, 2014	Haleakala	Pan-STARRS 1	·	2.0 km	MPC; JPL
864383	2014 XC_{54}	—	December 10, 2014	Mount Lemmon	Mount Lemmon Survey	·	670 m	MPC; JPL
864384	2014 XM_{54}	—	October 7, 2010	Catalina	CSS	·	960 m	MPC; JPL
864385	2014 XE_{55}	—	December 10, 2014	Mount Lemmon	Mount Lemmon Survey	·	810 m	MPC; JPL
864386	2014 XG_{56}	—	December 11, 2014	Mount Lemmon	Mount Lemmon Survey	EOS	1.2 km	MPC; JPL
864387	2014 YC_{1}	—	November 22, 2014	Haleakala	Pan-STARRS 1	H	450 m	MPC; JPL
864388	2014 YO_{1}	—	August 15, 2013	Haleakala	Pan-STARRS 1	TIR	2.1 km	MPC; JPL
864389	2014 YO_{5}	—	January 30, 2011	Mount Lemmon	Mount Lemmon Survey	·	900 m	MPC; JPL
864390	2014 YX_{8}	—	May 29, 2011	Nogales	M. Schwartz, P. R. Holvorcem	BAR	980 m	MPC; JPL
864391	2014 YW_{13}	—	October 4, 2014	Haleakala	Pan-STARRS 1	PHO	980 m	MPC; JPL
864392	2014 YU_{14}	—	November 25, 2014	Haleakala	Pan-STARRS 1	H	360 m	MPC; JPL
864393	2014 YC_{15}	—	October 28, 2014	Haleakala	Pan-STARRS 1	AMO	650 m	MPC; JPL
864394	2014 YB_{16}	—	December 21, 2014	Mount Lemmon	Mount Lemmon Survey	TIR	2.5 km	MPC; JPL
864395	2014 YU_{18}	—	December 20, 2014	Haleakala	Pan-STARRS 1	TIR	2.2 km	MPC; JPL
864396	2014 YN_{19}	—	January 26, 2012	Mount Lemmon	Mount Lemmon Survey	·	530 m	MPC; JPL
864397	2014 YO_{20}	—	November 3, 2014	Mount Lemmon	Mount Lemmon Survey	·	2.4 km	MPC; JPL
864398	2014 YG_{30}	—	December 30, 2007	Kitt Peak	Spacewatch	·	790 m	MPC; JPL
864399	2014 YK_{34}	—	November 28, 2014	Mount Lemmon	Mount Lemmon Survey	·	570 m	MPC; JPL
864400	2014 YY_{36}	—	December 26, 2014	Haleakala	Pan-STARRS 1	·	2.4 km	MPC; JPL

== 864401–864500 ==
back to top

Designation			Discovery			Properties		Ref
Permanent	Provisional	Named after	Date	Site	Discoverer(s)	Category	Diam.	Ref
864401	2014 YQ_{39}	—	December 27, 2014	Haleakala	Pan-STARRS 1	·	830 m	MPC; JPL
864402	2014 YD_{40}	—	December 11, 2014	Mount Lemmon	Mount Lemmon Survey	TIR	2.1 km	MPC; JPL
864403	2014 YW_{41}	—	December 29, 2014	Haleakala	Pan-STARRS 1	H	480 m	MPC; JPL
864404 Paulmueller	2014 YB_{43}	Paulmueller	December 27, 2014	Mount Graham	K. Černis, R. P. Boyle	·	1.0 km	MPC; JPL
864405	2014 YV_{43}	—	December 30, 2014	Haleakala	Pan-STARRS 1	T_{j} (2.55) · APO +1km	850 m	MPC; JPL
864406	2014 YW_{46}	—	October 20, 2014	Mount Lemmon	Mount Lemmon Survey	H	430 m	MPC; JPL
864407	2014 YC_{49}	—	December 28, 2003	Kitt Peak	Spacewatch	·	710 m	MPC; JPL
864408	2014 YD_{49}	—	August 9, 2013	Haleakala	Pan-STARRS 1	THB	2.1 km	MPC; JPL
864409	2014 YA_{51}	—	July 18, 2005	Palomar	NEAT	H	460 m	MPC; JPL
864410	2014 YP_{51}	—	August 13, 2006	Lulin	LUSS	H	410 m	MPC; JPL
864411	2014 YZ_{51}	—	December 29, 2014	Haleakala	Pan-STARRS 1	H	440 m	MPC; JPL
864412	2014 YC_{52}	—	December 16, 2014	Haleakala	Pan-STARRS 1	H	430 m	MPC; JPL
864413	2014 YK_{52}	—	December 27, 2014	Haleakala	Pan-STARRS 1	H	530 m	MPC; JPL
864414	2014 YS_{52}	—	December 21, 2014	Haleakala	Pan-STARRS 1	·	2.0 km	MPC; JPL
864415	2014 YX_{52}	—	December 10, 2010	Kitt Peak	Spacewatch	·	880 m	MPC; JPL
864416	2014 YJ_{53}	—	August 1, 2013	Westfield	International Astronomical Search Collaboration	·	2.6 km	MPC; JPL
864417	2014 YA_{59}	—	January 30, 2011	Mount Lemmon	Mount Lemmon Survey	RAF	680 m	MPC; JPL
864418	2014 YU_{59}	—	August 15, 2013	Haleakala	Pan-STARRS 1	·	560 m	MPC; JPL
864419	2014 YG_{60}	—	December 21, 2014	Haleakala	Pan-STARRS 1	CLA	1.2 km	MPC; JPL
864420	2014 YL_{62}	—	July 14, 2013	Haleakala	Pan-STARRS 1	·	410 m	MPC; JPL
864421	2014 YG_{64}	—	December 21, 2014	Haleakala	Pan-STARRS 1	·	420 m	MPC; JPL
864422	2014 YN_{64}	—	December 20, 2014	Haleakala	Pan-STARRS 1	·	1.0 km	MPC; JPL
864423	2014 YX_{64}	—	December 25, 2014	Haleakala	Pan-STARRS 1	·	380 m	MPC; JPL
864424	2014 YQ_{65}	—	December 29, 2014	Mount Lemmon	Mount Lemmon Survey	·	980 m	MPC; JPL
864425	2014 YT_{65}	—	December 21, 2014	Mount Lemmon	Mount Lemmon Survey	·	460 m	MPC; JPL
864426	2014 YK_{66}	—	December 29, 2014	Haleakala	Pan-STARRS 1	·	2.8 km	MPC; JPL
864427	2014 YM_{67}	—	August 9, 2016	Haleakala	Pan-STARRS 1	H	440 m	MPC; JPL
864428	2014 YN_{67}	—	August 28, 2013	Mount Lemmon	Mount Lemmon Survey	·	2.0 km	MPC; JPL
864429	2014 YB_{68}	—	December 27, 2014	Haleakala	Pan-STARRS 1	·	2.1 km	MPC; JPL
864430	2014 YH_{68}	—	December 21, 2014	Haleakala	Pan-STARRS 1	URS	2.3 km	MPC; JPL
864431	2014 YO_{68}	—	December 21, 2014	Mount Lemmon	Mount Lemmon Survey	·	2.1 km	MPC; JPL
864432	2014 YP_{68}	—	December 16, 2014	Haleakala	Pan-STARRS 1	·	2.5 km	MPC; JPL
864433	2014 YA_{69}	—	July 10, 2018	Haleakala	Pan-STARRS 1	·	2.4 km	MPC; JPL
864434	2014 YR_{69}	—	December 21, 2014	Haleakala	Pan-STARRS 1	·	2.0 km	MPC; JPL
864435	2014 YZ_{69}	—	December 21, 2014	Haleakala	Pan-STARRS 1	·	2.4 km	MPC; JPL
864436	2014 YC_{70}	—	November 30, 2008	Kitt Peak	Spacewatch	THB	1.8 km	MPC; JPL
864437	2014 YG_{72}	—	July 14, 2013	Haleakala	Pan-STARRS 1	THB	1.8 km	MPC; JPL
864438	2014 YQ_{72}	—	December 10, 2019	Haleakala	Pan-STARRS 1	H	380 m	MPC; JPL
864439	2014 YN_{73}	—	December 29, 2014	Haleakala	Pan-STARRS 1	·	2.3 km	MPC; JPL
864440	2014 YS_{73}	—	December 24, 2014	Mount Lemmon	Mount Lemmon Survey	·	2.7 km	MPC; JPL
864441	2014 YX_{73}	—	December 29, 2014	Mount Lemmon	Mount Lemmon Survey	BRA	890 m	MPC; JPL
864442	2014 YH_{74}	—	December 23, 2014	Mount Lemmon	Mount Lemmon Survey	·	890 m	MPC; JPL
864443	2014 YG_{75}	—	December 29, 2014	Haleakala	Pan-STARRS 1	·	2.5 km	MPC; JPL
864444	2014 YG_{76}	—	December 21, 2014	Haleakala	Pan-STARRS 1	·	2.6 km	MPC; JPL
864445	2014 YK_{76}	—	December 26, 2014	Haleakala	Pan-STARRS 1	·	1.5 km	MPC; JPL
864446	2014 YF_{78}	—	December 26, 2014	Haleakala	Pan-STARRS 1	H	380 m	MPC; JPL
864447	2014 YR_{78}	—	December 21, 2014	Haleakala	Pan-STARRS 1	·	1.1 km	MPC; JPL
864448	2014 YS_{78}	—	December 28, 2014	Mount Lemmon	Mount Lemmon Survey	·	1.0 km	MPC; JPL
864449	2014 YV_{78}	—	December 22, 2014	Haleakala	Pan-STARRS 1	H	350 m	MPC; JPL
864450	2014 YV_{79}	—	December 18, 2014	Haleakala	Pan-STARRS 1	·	1.1 km	MPC; JPL
864451	2014 YE_{80}	—	December 16, 2014	Haleakala	Pan-STARRS 1	·	580 m	MPC; JPL
864452	2014 YR_{82}	—	December 21, 2014	Haleakala	Pan-STARRS 1	·	2.4 km	MPC; JPL
864453	2014 YZ_{82}	—	February 12, 2012	Mount Lemmon	Mount Lemmon Survey	·	440 m	MPC; JPL
864454	2014 YF_{83}	—	December 29, 2014	Mount Lemmon	Mount Lemmon Survey	THM	1.9 km	MPC; JPL
864455	2014 YG_{83}	—	December 21, 2014	Haleakala	Pan-STARRS 1	·	520 m	MPC; JPL
864456	2014 YP_{83}	—	December 20, 2014	Haleakala	Pan-STARRS 1	·	2.5 km	MPC; JPL
864457	2014 YP_{85}	—	December 29, 2014	Haleakala	Pan-STARRS 1	EOS	1.3 km	MPC; JPL
864458	2014 YT_{90}	—	December 26, 2014	Haleakala	Pan-STARRS 1	·	1.2 km	MPC; JPL
864459	2014 YX_{90}	—	December 16, 2014	Haleakala	Pan-STARRS 1	·	2.1 km	MPC; JPL
864460	2014 YB_{91}	—	December 20, 2014	Haleakala	Pan-STARRS 1	·	2.0 km	MPC; JPL
864461	2014 YN_{91}	—	October 9, 2010	Mount Lemmon	Mount Lemmon Survey	·	900 m	MPC; JPL
864462	2014 YU_{92}	—	December 26, 2014	Haleakala	Pan-STARRS 1	·	830 m	MPC; JPL
864463	2014 YW_{93}	—	December 18, 2014	Haleakala	Pan-STARRS 1	·	2.6 km	MPC; JPL
864464	2014 YE_{95}	—	October 14, 2013	Mount Lemmon	Mount Lemmon Survey	L5	6.1 km	MPC; JPL
864465	2014 YS_{95}	—	December 29, 2014	Haleakala	Pan-STARRS 1	PHO	660 m	MPC; JPL
864466	2014 YS_{96}	—	December 21, 2014	Haleakala	Pan-STARRS 1	·	1.5 km	MPC; JPL
864467	2014 YV_{97}	—	December 26, 2014	Haleakala	Pan-STARRS 1	·	2.7 km	MPC; JPL
864468	2014 YS_{102}	—	November 22, 2014	Haleakala	Pan-STARRS 1	L5	7.7 km	MPC; JPL
864469	2015 AJ_{2}	—	May 14, 2012	Haleakala	Pan-STARRS 1	BAR	1.1 km	MPC; JPL
864470	2015 AN_{2}	—	March 21, 2010	Mount Lemmon	Mount Lemmon Survey	·	2.3 km	MPC; JPL
864471	2015 AH_{4}	—	September 18, 2014	Haleakala	Pan-STARRS 1	·	1.7 km	MPC; JPL
864472	2015 AS_{4}	—	September 23, 2008	Mount Lemmon	Mount Lemmon Survey	·	2.0 km	MPC; JPL
864473	2015 AH_{5}	—	December 1, 2014	Haleakala	Pan-STARRS 1	H	410 m	MPC; JPL
864474	2015 AK_{5}	—	November 23, 2014	Haleakala	Pan-STARRS 1	·	2.0 km	MPC; JPL
864475	2015 AA_{6}	—	November 27, 2014	Catalina	CSS	·	2.0 km	MPC; JPL
864476	2015 AU_{6}	—	September 17, 2009	Mount Lemmon	Mount Lemmon Survey	·	1.2 km	MPC; JPL
864477	2015 AJ_{8}	—	December 25, 2014	Haleakala	Pan-STARRS 1	EUN	1.0 km	MPC; JPL
864478	2015 AX_{10}	—	September 14, 2007	Kitt Peak	Spacewatch	LUT	2.5 km	MPC; JPL
864479	2015 AB_{12}	—	December 29, 2014	Haleakala	Pan-STARRS 1	HNS	620 m	MPC; JPL
864480	2015 AJ_{12}	—	July 14, 2013	Haleakala	Pan-STARRS 1	PHO	720 m	MPC; JPL
864481	2015 AP_{12}	—	December 29, 2014	Haleakala	Pan-STARRS 1	·	1.8 km	MPC; JPL
864482	2015 AY_{12}	—	December 26, 2014	Haleakala	Pan-STARRS 1	·	1.9 km	MPC; JPL
864483	2015 AY_{13}	—	October 5, 2013	Haleakala	Pan-STARRS 1	BRG	1.3 km	MPC; JPL
864484	2015 AC_{14}	—	November 13, 2006	Catalina	CSS	PHO	770 m	MPC; JPL
864485	2015 AZ_{15}	—	December 26, 2014	Haleakala	Pan-STARRS 1	GAL	1.1 km	MPC; JPL
864486	2015 AD_{16}	—	December 27, 2014	Haleakala	Pan-STARRS 1	THB	2.3 km	MPC; JPL
864487	2015 AJ_{19}	—	May 21, 2013	Mount Lemmon	Mount Lemmon Survey	BAR	1.2 km	MPC; JPL
864488	2015 AN_{19}	—	December 25, 2005	Mount Lemmon	Mount Lemmon Survey	(18466)	1.6 km	MPC; JPL
864489	2015 AO_{19}	—	November 28, 2014	Kitt Peak	Spacewatch	·	820 m	MPC; JPL
864490	2015 AA_{20}	—	November 27, 2014	Haleakala	Pan-STARRS 1	H	430 m	MPC; JPL
864491	2015 AO_{20}	—	November 26, 2014	Haleakala	Pan-STARRS 1	H	440 m	MPC; JPL
864492	2015 AU_{20}	—	January 12, 2015	Haleakala	Pan-STARRS 1	·	1.7 km	MPC; JPL
864493	2015 AS_{21}	—	October 30, 2008	Catalina	CSS	·	2.5 km	MPC; JPL
864494	2015 AT_{23}	—	November 30, 2014	Haleakala	Pan-STARRS 1	·	2.0 km	MPC; JPL
864495	2015 AU_{24}	—	September 20, 2014	Haleakala	Pan-STARRS 1	H	380 m	MPC; JPL
864496	2015 AH_{28}	—	January 25, 2009	Kitt Peak	Spacewatch	·	710 m	MPC; JPL
864497	2015 AX_{28}	—	September 14, 2007	Mount Lemmon	Mount Lemmon Survey	·	500 m	MPC; JPL
864498	2015 AP_{31}	—	December 21, 2014	Haleakala	Pan-STARRS 1	·	990 m	MPC; JPL
864499	2015 AE_{36}	—	September 30, 2006	Mount Lemmon	Mount Lemmon Survey	·	710 m	MPC; JPL
864500	2015 AR_{36}	—	February 13, 2008	Kitt Peak	Spacewatch	·	690 m	MPC; JPL

== 864501–864600 ==
back to top

Designation			Discovery			Properties		Ref
Permanent	Provisional	Named after	Date	Site	Discoverer(s)	Category	Diam.	Ref
864501	2015 AK_{43}	—	October 16, 2006	Kitt Peak	Spacewatch	MAS	430 m	MPC; JPL
864502	2015 AE_{46}	—	September 29, 2005	Kitt Peak	Spacewatch	JUN	630 m	MPC; JPL
864503	2015 AP_{46}	—	October 29, 2014	Haleakala	Pan-STARRS 1	·	2.2 km	MPC; JPL
864504	2015 AM_{47}	—	October 1, 2005	Catalina	CSS	·	1.3 km	MPC; JPL
864505	2015 AC_{50}	—	January 13, 2015	Haleakala	Pan-STARRS 1	·	1.5 km	MPC; JPL
864506	2015 AO_{52}	—	December 29, 2014	Mount Lemmon	Mount Lemmon Survey	TIR	2.0 km	MPC; JPL
864507	2015 AS_{52}	—	December 15, 2014	Mount Lemmon	Mount Lemmon Survey	·	450 m	MPC; JPL
864508	2015 AC_{53}	—	September 1, 2013	Haleakala	Pan-STARRS 1	·	1.2 km	MPC; JPL
864509	2015 AP_{58}	—	January 13, 2015	Haleakala	Pan-STARRS 1	·	2.2 km	MPC; JPL
864510	2015 AE_{59}	—	September 6, 2013	Mount Lemmon	Mount Lemmon Survey	·	1.7 km	MPC; JPL
864511	2015 AV_{60}	—	October 27, 2006	Mount Lemmon	Mount Lemmon Survey	NYS	780 m	MPC; JPL
864512	2015 AG_{69}	—	January 13, 2015	Haleakala	Pan-STARRS 1	·	1.2 km	MPC; JPL
864513	2015 AD_{71}	—	January 13, 2015	Haleakala	Pan-STARRS 1	·	470 m	MPC; JPL
864514	2015 AX_{71}	—	January 13, 2015	Haleakala	Pan-STARRS 1	·	2.0 km	MPC; JPL
864515	2015 AA_{79}	—	December 3, 2010	Mount Lemmon	Mount Lemmon Survey	NYS	830 m	MPC; JPL
864516	2015 AT_{80}	—	December 21, 2014	Haleakala	Pan-STARRS 1	·	1.0 km	MPC; JPL
864517	2015 AX_{80}	—	January 13, 2015	Haleakala	Pan-STARRS 1	·	420 m	MPC; JPL
864518	2015 AB_{85}	—	January 13, 2015	Haleakala	Pan-STARRS 1	·	1.1 km	MPC; JPL
864519	2015 AE_{86}	—	February 13, 2008	Mount Lemmon	Mount Lemmon Survey	·	830 m	MPC; JPL
864520	2015 AZ_{91}	—	January 13, 2015	Haleakala	Pan-STARRS 1	·	470 m	MPC; JPL
864521	2015 AH_{93}	—	February 23, 2012	Mount Lemmon	Mount Lemmon Survey	·	440 m	MPC; JPL
864522	2015 AL_{93}	—	July 14, 2013	Haleakala	Pan-STARRS 1	·	420 m	MPC; JPL
864523	2015 AE_{94}	—	November 26, 2014	Haleakala	Pan-STARRS 1	TIR	2.4 km	MPC; JPL
864524	2015 AD_{101}	—	August 30, 2005	Kitt Peak	Spacewatch	·	930 m	MPC; JPL
864525	2015 AQ_{103}	—	August 28, 2006	Catalina	CSS	NYS	820 m	MPC; JPL
864526	2015 AS_{103}	—	August 13, 2013	Kitt Peak	Spacewatch	LIX	2.1 km	MPC; JPL
864527	2015 AN_{106}	—	January 14, 2015	Haleakala	Pan-STARRS 1	·	1.1 km	MPC; JPL
864528	2015 AB_{107}	—	January 14, 2015	Haleakala	Pan-STARRS 1	·	1.7 km	MPC; JPL
864529	2015 AU_{107}	—	August 10, 2007	Kitt Peak	Spacewatch	THM	1.6 km	MPC; JPL
864530	2015 AV_{107}	—	December 21, 2014	Haleakala	Pan-STARRS 1	V	420 m	MPC; JPL
864531	2015 AM_{109}	—	December 21, 2014	Mount Lemmon	Mount Lemmon Survey	·	740 m	MPC; JPL
864532	2015 AB_{111}	—	August 10, 2007	Kitt Peak	Spacewatch	·	1.7 km	MPC; JPL
864533	2015 AB_{112}	—	February 9, 2010	Mount Lemmon	Mount Lemmon Survey	·	1.4 km	MPC; JPL
864534	2015 AN_{115}	—	December 21, 2014	Haleakala	Pan-STARRS 1	·	880 m	MPC; JPL
864535	2015 AT_{118}	—	January 14, 2015	Haleakala	Pan-STARRS 1	·	780 m	MPC; JPL
864536	2015 AK_{119}	—	October 31, 2006	Mount Lemmon	Mount Lemmon Survey	NYS	810 m	MPC; JPL
864537	2015 AH_{123}	—	January 14, 2015	Haleakala	Pan-STARRS 1	·	2.4 km	MPC; JPL
864538	2015 AR_{123}	—	October 2, 2013	Mount Lemmon	Mount Lemmon Survey	·	1.1 km	MPC; JPL
864539	2015 AH_{127}	—	December 21, 2014	Haleakala	Pan-STARRS 1	·	910 m	MPC; JPL
864540	2015 AJ_{130}	—	October 5, 2013	Haleakala	Pan-STARRS 1	·	1.5 km	MPC; JPL
864541	2015 AB_{131}	—	December 21, 2014	Haleakala	Pan-STARRS 1	·	2.4 km	MPC; JPL
864542	2015 AD_{131}	—	November 19, 2003	Kitt Peak	Spacewatch	NYS	700 m	MPC; JPL
864543	2015 AR_{137}	—	January 14, 2015	Haleakala	Pan-STARRS 1	NYS	860 m	MPC; JPL
864544	2015 AR_{138}	—	October 16, 2009	Mount Lemmon	Mount Lemmon Survey	·	890 m	MPC; JPL
864545	2015 AD_{150}	—	April 27, 2011	Mount Lemmon	Mount Lemmon Survey	EOS	1.4 km	MPC; JPL
864546	2015 AN_{153}	—	November 6, 2010	Mount Lemmon	Mount Lemmon Survey	(2076)	520 m	MPC; JPL
864547	2015 AH_{172}	—	December 21, 2014	Haleakala	Pan-STARRS 1	·	1.7 km	MPC; JPL
864548	2015 AW_{177}	—	April 21, 2009	Kitt Peak	Spacewatch	·	380 m	MPC; JPL
864549	2015 AA_{178}	—	January 14, 2015	Haleakala	Pan-STARRS 1	EOS	1.3 km	MPC; JPL
864550	2015 AG_{180}	—	October 15, 2009	Mount Lemmon	Mount Lemmon Survey	MIS	1.4 km	MPC; JPL
864551	2015 AO_{184}	—	December 21, 2014	Haleakala	Pan-STARRS 1	AGN	890 m	MPC; JPL
864552	2015 AN_{185}	—	July 12, 2013	Haleakala	Pan-STARRS 1	·	720 m	MPC; JPL
864553	2015 AQ_{187}	—	October 3, 2013	Haleakala	Pan-STARRS 1	·	1.1 km	MPC; JPL
864554	2015 AA_{188}	—	January 14, 2015	Haleakala	Pan-STARRS 1	·	1.3 km	MPC; JPL
864555	2015 AC_{189}	—	December 21, 2014	Haleakala	Pan-STARRS 1	·	2.3 km	MPC; JPL
864556	2015 AF_{189}	—	January 14, 2015	Haleakala	Pan-STARRS 1	·	1.3 km	MPC; JPL
864557	2015 AF_{190}	—	December 21, 2014	Haleakala	Pan-STARRS 1	VER	2.1 km	MPC; JPL
864558	2015 AU_{190}	—	April 28, 2012	Mount Lemmon	Mount Lemmon Survey	NYS	850 m	MPC; JPL
864559	2015 AC_{194}	—	January 14, 2015	Haleakala	Pan-STARRS 1	·	600 m	MPC; JPL
864560	2015 AZ_{195}	—	September 20, 2007	Kitt Peak	Spacewatch	·	2.0 km	MPC; JPL
864561	2015 AT_{197}	—	March 5, 2011	Mount Lemmon	Mount Lemmon Survey	·	1.1 km	MPC; JPL
864562	2015 AR_{201}	—	December 26, 2014	Haleakala	Pan-STARRS 1	·	2.0 km	MPC; JPL
864563	2015 AO_{205}	—	August 15, 2013	Haleakala	Pan-STARRS 1	·	2.6 km	MPC; JPL
864564	2015 AZ_{206}	—	October 10, 2008	Mount Lemmon	Mount Lemmon Survey	·	2.3 km	MPC; JPL
864565	2015 AQ_{207}	—	September 20, 2014	Haleakala	Pan-STARRS 1	EOS	1.2 km	MPC; JPL
864566	2015 AC_{209}	—	September 22, 2014	Haleakala	Pan-STARRS 1	H	410 m	MPC; JPL
864567	2015 AU_{211}	—	November 22, 2014	Haleakala	Pan-STARRS 1	·	1.4 km	MPC; JPL
864568	2015 AU_{212}	—	July 13, 2013	Haleakala	Pan-STARRS 1	·	2.7 km	MPC; JPL
864569	2015 AU_{214}	—	December 16, 2014	Haleakala	Pan-STARRS 1	·	2.2 km	MPC; JPL
864570	2015 AX_{217}	—	January 15, 2015	Haleakala	Pan-STARRS 1	·	630 m	MPC; JPL
864571	2015 AU_{221}	—	March 12, 2005	Kitt Peak	Deep Ecliptic Survey	·	1.7 km	MPC; JPL
864572	2015 AC_{222}	—	August 16, 2013	Mauna Kea	D. J. Tholen, M. Micheli	·	1.1 km	MPC; JPL
864573	2015 AN_{225}	—	January 15, 2015	Haleakala	Pan-STARRS 1	·	2.2 km	MPC; JPL
864574	2015 AH_{228}	—	January 15, 2015	Haleakala	Pan-STARRS 1	·	2.5 km	MPC; JPL
864575	2015 AJ_{229}	—	January 15, 2015	Haleakala	Pan-STARRS 1	·	830 m	MPC; JPL
864576	2015 AS_{230}	—	October 19, 2003	Kitt Peak	Spacewatch	·	570 m	MPC; JPL
864577	2015 AA_{231}	—	January 15, 2015	Haleakala	Pan-STARRS 1	·	2.2 km	MPC; JPL
864578	2015 AL_{231}	—	January 15, 2015	Haleakala	Pan-STARRS 1	·	530 m	MPC; JPL
864579	2015 AE_{235}	—	January 15, 2015	Haleakala	Pan-STARRS 1	MAR	800 m	MPC; JPL
864580	2015 AW_{236}	—	January 15, 2015	Haleakala	Pan-STARRS 1	·	1.0 km	MPC; JPL
864581	2015 AM_{237}	—	November 9, 2013	Mount Lemmon	Mount Lemmon Survey	EOS	1.5 km	MPC; JPL
864582	2015 AX_{237}	—	September 25, 2006	Mount Lemmon	Mount Lemmon Survey	·	870 m	MPC; JPL
864583	2015 AC_{239}	—	January 15, 2015	Haleakala	Pan-STARRS 1	KON	2.1 km	MPC; JPL
864584	2015 AF_{239}	—	November 29, 2014	Haleakala	Pan-STARRS 1	H	550 m	MPC; JPL
864585	2015 AG_{240}	—	September 16, 2006	Catalina	CSS	·	950 m	MPC; JPL
864586	2015 AN_{243}	—	January 15, 2015	Haleakala	Pan-STARRS 1	·	1.1 km	MPC; JPL
864587	2015 AP_{244}	—	April 29, 2011	Catalina	CSS	(1547)	1.1 km	MPC; JPL
864588	2015 AU_{247}	—	December 15, 2014	Mount Lemmon	Mount Lemmon Survey	·	1.0 km	MPC; JPL
864589	2015 AA_{248}	—	January 13, 2015	Haleakala	Pan-STARRS 1	·	880 m	MPC; JPL
864590	2015 AE_{248}	—	January 13, 2015	Haleakala	Pan-STARRS 1	·	2.5 km	MPC; JPL
864591	2015 AM_{249}	—	January 13, 2015	Haleakala	Pan-STARRS 1	·	1.6 km	MPC; JPL
864592	2015 AH_{250}	—	December 1, 2010	Mount Lemmon	Mount Lemmon Survey	PHO	590 m	MPC; JPL
864593	2015 AG_{256}	—	January 15, 2015	Haleakala	Pan-STARRS 1	L5	7.1 km	MPC; JPL
864594	2015 AR_{256}	—	December 21, 2014	Haleakala	Pan-STARRS 1	·	530 m	MPC; JPL
864595	2015 AW_{257}	—	December 21, 2014	Haleakala	Pan-STARRS 1	·	630 m	MPC; JPL
864596	2015 AO_{263}	—	January 13, 2002	Palomar	NEAT	·	1.3 km	MPC; JPL
864597	2015 AY_{267}	—	January 13, 2015	Haleakala	Pan-STARRS 1	·	2.2 km	MPC; JPL
864598	2015 AE_{268}	—	January 13, 2015	Haleakala	Pan-STARRS 1	V	400 m	MPC; JPL
864599	2015 AL_{271}	—	January 13, 2015	Haleakala	Pan-STARRS 1	·	650 m	MPC; JPL
864600	2015 AS_{271}	—	September 17, 2006	Kitt Peak	Spacewatch	·	800 m	MPC; JPL

== 864601–864700 ==
back to top

Designation			Discovery			Properties		Ref
Permanent	Provisional	Named after	Date	Site	Discoverer(s)	Category	Diam.	Ref
864601	2015 AE_{272}	—	December 21, 2014	Haleakala	Pan-STARRS 1	·	840 m	MPC; JPL
864602	2015 AG_{273}	—	January 13, 2015	Haleakala	Pan-STARRS 1	·	410 m	MPC; JPL
864603	2015 AV_{274}	—	October 25, 2013	Mount Lemmon	Mount Lemmon Survey	AGN	860 m	MPC; JPL
864604	2015 AO_{275}	—	January 15, 2015	Kitt Peak	Spacewatch	·	1.1 km	MPC; JPL
864605	2015 AR_{277}	—	January 15, 2015	Haleakala	Pan-STARRS 1	EOS	1.2 km	MPC; JPL
864606	2015 AE_{278}	—	January 15, 2015	Haleakala	Pan-STARRS 1	·	1.1 km	MPC; JPL
864607	2015 AR_{279}	—	January 15, 2015	Mount Lemmon	Mount Lemmon Survey	H	450 m	MPC; JPL
864608	2015 AX_{280}	—	January 7, 2006	Kitt Peak	Spacewatch	AEO	720 m	MPC; JPL
864609	2015 AL_{282}	—	February 13, 2002	Palomar	NEAT	H	400 m	MPC; JPL
864610	2015 AB_{283}	—	November 22, 2014	Mount Lemmon	Mount Lemmon Survey	·	2.0 km	MPC; JPL
864611	2015 AF_{283}	—	January 14, 2015	Haleakala	Pan-STARRS 1	·	1.3 km	MPC; JPL
864612	2015 AO_{285}	—	October 26, 2008	Kitt Peak	Spacewatch	EOS	1.3 km	MPC; JPL
864613	2015 AT_{285}	—	January 14, 2015	Haleakala	Pan-STARRS 1	MAS	620 m	MPC; JPL
864614	2015 AB_{286}	—	January 14, 2011	Mount Lemmon	Mount Lemmon Survey	·	1.1 km	MPC; JPL
864615	2015 AE_{293}	—	January 15, 2015	Haleakala	Pan-STARRS 1	·	1.3 km	MPC; JPL
864616	2015 AV_{295}	—	January 11, 2015	Haleakala	Pan-STARRS 1	H	450 m	MPC; JPL
864617	2015 AC_{296}	—	January 15, 2015	Haleakala	Pan-STARRS 1	·	560 m	MPC; JPL
864618	2015 AH_{296}	—	January 13, 2015	Haleakala	Pan-STARRS 1	·	2.5 km	MPC; JPL
864619	2015 AD_{299}	—	January 15, 2015	Haleakala	Pan-STARRS 1	H	360 m	MPC; JPL
864620	2015 AQ_{299}	—	January 12, 2015	Haleakala	Pan-STARRS 1	L5	7.2 km	MPC; JPL
864621	2015 AO_{300}	—	January 15, 2015	Haleakala	Pan-STARRS 1	·	530 m	MPC; JPL
864622	2015 AN_{302}	—	January 15, 2015	Haleakala	Pan-STARRS 1	·	2.0 km	MPC; JPL
864623	2015 AP_{304}	—	January 13, 2015	Haleakala	Pan-STARRS 1	·	2.1 km	MPC; JPL
864624	2015 AN_{305}	—	February 13, 2008	Mount Lemmon	Mount Lemmon Survey	·	690 m	MPC; JPL
864625	2015 BN_{3}	—	December 21, 2014	Mount Lemmon	Mount Lemmon Survey	H	480 m	MPC; JPL
864626	2015 BZ_{12}	—	January 16, 2015	Mount Lemmon	Mount Lemmon Survey	·	550 m	MPC; JPL
864627	2015 BU_{13}	—	January 16, 2015	Mount Lemmon	Mount Lemmon Survey	·	2.1 km	MPC; JPL
864628	2015 BA_{14}	—	October 8, 2008	Mount Lemmon	Mount Lemmon Survey	EOS	1.4 km	MPC; JPL
864629	2015 BV_{14}	—	December 26, 2014	Haleakala	Pan-STARRS 1	PHO	810 m	MPC; JPL
864630	2015 BZ_{18}	—	December 26, 2014	Haleakala	Pan-STARRS 1	·	440 m	MPC; JPL
864631	2015 BL_{32}	—	January 16, 2015	Haleakala	Pan-STARRS 1	EUP	2.7 km	MPC; JPL
864632	2015 BC_{35}	—	January 16, 2015	Haleakala	Pan-STARRS 1	·	970 m	MPC; JPL
864633	2015 BM_{39}	—	November 21, 2014	Haleakala	Pan-STARRS 1	·	1.5 km	MPC; JPL
864634	2015 BE_{42}	—	October 17, 2009	Mount Lemmon	Mount Lemmon Survey	·	1.1 km	MPC; JPL
864635	2015 BH_{43}	—	November 26, 2014	Haleakala	Pan-STARRS 1	EUN	970 m	MPC; JPL
864636	2015 BG_{46}	—	November 2, 2010	Mount Lemmon	Mount Lemmon Survey	·	730 m	MPC; JPL
864637	2015 BN_{46}	—	January 17, 2015	Haleakala	Pan-STARRS 1	·	1.7 km	MPC; JPL
864638	2015 BD_{49}	—	January 17, 2015	Haleakala	Pan-STARRS 1	PHO	740 m	MPC; JPL
864639	2015 BP_{50}	—	January 17, 2015	Haleakala	Pan-STARRS 1	·	680 m	MPC; JPL
864640	2015 BR_{51}	—	October 24, 2008	Kitt Peak	Spacewatch	·	2.0 km	MPC; JPL
864641	2015 BK_{52}	—	November 28, 2014	Haleakala	Pan-STARRS 1	·	860 m	MPC; JPL
864642	2015 BK_{55}	—	September 18, 2006	Kitt Peak	Spacewatch	·	690 m	MPC; JPL
864643	2015 BP_{60}	—	January 17, 2015	Haleakala	Pan-STARRS 1	MAS	520 m	MPC; JPL
864644	2015 BS_{67}	—	December 19, 2004	Mount Lemmon	Mount Lemmon Survey	·	400 m	MPC; JPL
864645	2015 BZ_{70}	—	March 12, 2010	Mount Lemmon	Mount Lemmon Survey	·	1.8 km	MPC; JPL
864646	2015 BF_{75}	—	January 17, 2015	Haleakala	Pan-STARRS 1	T_{j} (2.99) · EUP	2.6 km	MPC; JPL
864647	2015 BT_{75}	—	January 17, 2015	Haleakala	Pan-STARRS 1	MRX	680 m	MPC; JPL
864648	2015 BL_{77}	—	January 17, 2015	Haleakala	Pan-STARRS 1	·	2.0 km	MPC; JPL
864649	2015 BL_{79}	—	December 26, 2014	Haleakala	Pan-STARRS 1	KON	1.8 km	MPC; JPL
864650	2015 BH_{81}	—	December 21, 2014	Haleakala	Pan-STARRS 1	·	2.7 km	MPC; JPL
864651	2015 BT_{82}	—	January 18, 2015	Mount Lemmon	Mount Lemmon Survey	·	710 m	MPC; JPL
864652	2015 BA_{85}	—	February 27, 2008	Kitt Peak	Spacewatch	ERI	1 km	MPC; JPL
864653	2015 BH_{91}	—	January 18, 2015	Haleakala	Pan-STARRS 1	·	610 m	MPC; JPL
864654	2015 BT_{94}	—	December 21, 2014	Haleakala	Pan-STARRS 1	NYS	980 m	MPC; JPL
864655	2015 BS_{95}	—	January 16, 2015	Mount Lemmon	Mount Lemmon Survey	·	2.5 km	MPC; JPL
864656	2015 BR_{99}	—	January 16, 2015	Mount Lemmon	Mount Lemmon Survey	THM	1.5 km	MPC; JPL
864657	2015 BG_{100}	—	November 15, 2006	Mount Lemmon	Mount Lemmon Survey	·	900 m	MPC; JPL
864658	2015 BR_{112}	—	April 16, 2012	Kitt Peak	Spacewatch	·	810 m	MPC; JPL
864659	2015 BG_{116}	—	January 17, 2015	Mount Lemmon	Mount Lemmon Survey	·	780 m	MPC; JPL
864660	2015 BH_{116}	—	October 5, 2013	Haleakala	Pan-STARRS 1	·	2.2 km	MPC; JPL
864661	2015 BT_{117}	—	January 17, 2015	Mount Lemmon	Mount Lemmon Survey	·	1 km	MPC; JPL
864662	2015 BC_{126}	—	January 17, 2015	Haleakala	Pan-STARRS 1	·	490 m	MPC; JPL
864663	2015 BR_{127}	—	March 23, 2012	Mount Lemmon	Mount Lemmon Survey	·	490 m	MPC; JPL
864664	2015 BO_{128}	—	January 17, 2015	Haleakala	Pan-STARRS 1	·	820 m	MPC; JPL
864665	2015 BW_{129}	—	January 17, 2015	Haleakala	Pan-STARRS 1	·	770 m	MPC; JPL
864666	2015 BB_{130}	—	January 17, 2015	Haleakala	Pan-STARRS 1	·	1.3 km	MPC; JPL
864667	2015 BP_{131}	—	January 17, 2015	Haleakala	Pan-STARRS 1	·	1.0 km	MPC; JPL
864668	2015 BR_{132}	—	January 17, 2015	Haleakala	Pan-STARRS 1	·	980 m	MPC; JPL
864669	2015 BO_{135}	—	April 27, 2012	Haleakala	Pan-STARRS 1	·	460 m	MPC; JPL
864670	2015 BG_{140}	—	October 11, 2006	Palomar	NEAT	ERI	960 m	MPC; JPL
864671	2015 BB_{141}	—	January 17, 2015	Haleakala	Pan-STARRS 1	·	1 km	MPC; JPL
864672	2015 BZ_{142}	—	April 13, 2008	Mount Lemmon	Mount Lemmon Survey	·	900 m	MPC; JPL
864673	2015 BS_{151}	—	October 3, 2013	Mount Lemmon	Mount Lemmon Survey	·	1.4 km	MPC; JPL
864674	2015 BO_{152}	—	January 17, 2015	Haleakala	Pan-STARRS 1	VER	2.0 km	MPC; JPL
864675	2015 BX_{154}	—	January 17, 2015	Haleakala	Pan-STARRS 1	·	550 m	MPC; JPL
864676	2015 BM_{159}	—	July 19, 2013	Haleakala	Pan-STARRS 1	PHO	750 m	MPC; JPL
864677	2015 BY_{161}	—	July 13, 2013	Haleakala	Pan-STARRS 1	·	1.2 km	MPC; JPL
864678	2015 BW_{169}	—	January 17, 2015	Haleakala	Pan-STARRS 1	·	940 m	MPC; JPL
864679	2015 BN_{170}	—	January 17, 2015	Haleakala	Pan-STARRS 1	·	460 m	MPC; JPL
864680	2015 BY_{171}	—	November 1, 2005	Mount Lemmon	Mount Lemmon Survey	·	830 m	MPC; JPL
864681	2015 BB_{179}	—	January 17, 2015	Haleakala	Pan-STARRS 1	·	2.1 km	MPC; JPL
864682	2015 BK_{179}	—	January 17, 2015	Haleakala	Pan-STARRS 1	·	840 m	MPC; JPL
864683	2015 BA_{180}	—	September 9, 2007	Kitt Peak	Spacewatch	LIX	2.7 km	MPC; JPL
864684	2015 BB_{181}	—	April 1, 2008	Mount Lemmon	Mount Lemmon Survey	·	870 m	MPC; JPL
864685	2015 BL_{186}	—	January 17, 2015	Haleakala	Pan-STARRS 1	·	820 m	MPC; JPL
864686	2015 BQ_{188}	—	September 16, 2009	Mount Lemmon	Mount Lemmon Survey	·	970 m	MPC; JPL
864687	2015 BU_{190}	—	July 27, 2001	Anderson Mesa	LONEOS	·	2.2 km	MPC; JPL
864688	2015 BX_{190}	—	August 12, 2013	Haleakala	Pan-STARRS 1	·	910 m	MPC; JPL
864689	2015 BY_{194}	—	March 14, 2010	Mount Lemmon	Mount Lemmon Survey	·	1.7 km	MPC; JPL
864690	2015 BP_{197}	—	January 17, 2015	Haleakala	Pan-STARRS 1	PHO	530 m	MPC; JPL
864691	2015 BU_{202}	—	January 28, 2007	Kitt Peak	Spacewatch	·	910 m	MPC; JPL
864692	2015 BC_{203}	—	December 6, 1997	Caussols	ODAS	·	880 m	MPC; JPL
864693	2015 BL_{203}	—	December 8, 2010	Mount Lemmon	Mount Lemmon Survey	·	860 m	MPC; JPL
864694	2015 BR_{203}	—	January 18, 2015	Kitt Peak	Spacewatch	NYS	800 m	MPC; JPL
864695	2015 BX_{203}	—	January 18, 2015	Kitt Peak	Spacewatch	·	490 m	MPC; JPL
864696	2015 BZ_{203}	—	January 27, 2004	Anderson Mesa	LONEOS	H	470 m	MPC; JPL
864697	2015 BA_{206}	—	December 18, 2007	Mount Lemmon	Mount Lemmon Survey	NYS	630 m	MPC; JPL
864698	2015 BD_{206}	—	January 30, 2006	Kitt Peak	Spacewatch	·	1.2 km	MPC; JPL
864699	2015 BU_{207}	—	December 12, 2014	Haleakala	Pan-STARRS 1	·	2.0 km	MPC; JPL
864700	2015 BW_{208}	—	January 18, 2015	Haleakala	Pan-STARRS 1	·	580 m	MPC; JPL

== 864701–864800 ==
back to top

Designation			Discovery			Properties		Ref
Permanent	Provisional	Named after	Date	Site	Discoverer(s)	Category	Diam.	Ref
864701	2015 BP_{209}	—	October 2, 2006	Mount Lemmon	Mount Lemmon Survey	NYS	790 m	MPC; JPL
864702	2015 BQ_{210}	—	October 24, 2009	Kitt Peak	Spacewatch	·	1.1 km	MPC; JPL
864703	2015 BV_{210}	—	December 12, 2014	Haleakala	Pan-STARRS 1	·	710 m	MPC; JPL
864704	2015 BR_{213}	—	January 18, 2015	Mount Lemmon	Mount Lemmon Survey	·	1.4 km	MPC; JPL
864705	2015 BR_{214}	—	July 16, 2013	Haleakala	Pan-STARRS 1	·	2.8 km	MPC; JPL
864706	2015 BR_{216}	—	December 26, 2014	Haleakala	Pan-STARRS 1	·	1.4 km	MPC; JPL
864707	2015 BJ_{217}	—	January 18, 2015	Haleakala	Pan-STARRS 1	·	1.4 km	MPC; JPL
864708	2015 BA_{219}	—	February 10, 2008	Kitt Peak	Spacewatch	·	890 m	MPC; JPL
864709	2015 BE_{219}	—	December 26, 2014	Haleakala	Pan-STARRS 1	·	2.8 km	MPC; JPL
864710	2015 BO_{219}	—	December 26, 2014	Haleakala	Pan-STARRS 1	·	1.4 km	MPC; JPL
864711	2015 BF_{220}	—	September 9, 2007	Kitt Peak	Spacewatch	·	520 m	MPC; JPL
864712	2015 BH_{222}	—	December 26, 2014	Haleakala	Pan-STARRS 1	·	2.1 km	MPC; JPL
864713	2015 BM_{225}	—	December 26, 2014	Haleakala	Pan-STARRS 1	·	2.5 km	MPC; JPL
864714	2015 BW_{230}	—	December 29, 2014	Haleakala	Pan-STARRS 1	·	400 m	MPC; JPL
864715	2015 BL_{231}	—	January 26, 2011	Mount Lemmon	Mount Lemmon Survey	·	830 m	MPC; JPL
864716	2015 BB_{232}	—	December 29, 2014	Haleakala	Pan-STARRS 1	HNS	760 m	MPC; JPL
864717	2015 BL_{232}	—	October 29, 2010	Mount Lemmon	Mount Lemmon Survey	·	690 m	MPC; JPL
864718	2015 BR_{242}	—	January 18, 2015	Haleakala	Pan-STARRS 1	·	840 m	MPC; JPL
864719	2015 BJ_{245}	—	January 28, 2011	Mount Lemmon	Mount Lemmon Survey	·	790 m	MPC; JPL
864720	2015 BL_{245}	—	January 2, 2011	Mount Lemmon	Mount Lemmon Survey	·	820 m	MPC; JPL
864721	2015 BS_{247}	—	May 10, 2007	Mount Lemmon	Mount Lemmon Survey	·	1.2 km	MPC; JPL
864722	2015 BZ_{253}	—	January 18, 2015	Haleakala	Pan-STARRS 1	·	1.2 km	MPC; JPL
864723	2015 BT_{257}	—	January 18, 2015	Haleakala	Pan-STARRS 1	·	940 m	MPC; JPL
864724	2015 BP_{259}	—	February 9, 2008	Kitt Peak	Spacewatch	·	670 m	MPC; JPL
864725	2015 BU_{259}	—	March 13, 2010	Mount Lemmon	Mount Lemmon Survey	·	1.6 km	MPC; JPL
864726	2015 BF_{261}	—	November 14, 2010	Catalina	CSS	·	670 m	MPC; JPL
864727	2015 BO_{261}	—	August 27, 2013	Haleakala	Pan-STARRS 1	·	2.2 km	MPC; JPL
864728	2015 BQ_{264}	—	January 18, 2015	Haleakala	Pan-STARRS 1	·	1.2 km	MPC; JPL
864729	2015 BK_{265}	—	January 18, 2015	Mount Lemmon	Mount Lemmon Survey	MAR	700 m	MPC; JPL
864730	2015 BT_{267}	—	November 28, 2014	Haleakala	Pan-STARRS 1	TIR	1.8 km	MPC; JPL
864731	2015 BB_{268}	—	July 15, 2013	Haleakala	Pan-STARRS 1	·	2.0 km	MPC; JPL
864732	2015 BL_{268}	—	July 15, 2013	Haleakala	Pan-STARRS 1	·	2.0 km	MPC; JPL
864733	2015 BV_{269}	—	September 30, 2014	Mount Lemmon	Mount Lemmon Survey	TIR	2.1 km	MPC; JPL
864734	2015 BQ_{270}	—	October 26, 2014	Mount Lemmon	Mount Lemmon Survey	·	1.9 km	MPC; JPL
864735	2015 BL_{272}	—	November 11, 2014	Kitt Peak	Spacewatch	·	700 m	MPC; JPL
864736	2015 BO_{272}	—	November 26, 2014	Mount Lemmon	Mount Lemmon Survey	·	2.3 km	MPC; JPL
864737	2015 BS_{272}	—	August 28, 2006	Kitt Peak	Spacewatch	·	850 m	MPC; JPL
864738	2015 BW_{272}	—	December 16, 2014	Haleakala	Pan-STARRS 1	H	340 m	MPC; JPL
864739	2015 BF_{274}	—	January 18, 2008	Mount Lemmon	Mount Lemmon Survey	·	820 m	MPC; JPL
864740	2015 BD_{278}	—	February 8, 2002	Kitt Peak	Spacewatch	·	1.3 km	MPC; JPL
864741	2015 BS_{280}	—	January 19, 2015	Haleakala	Pan-STARRS 1	·	2.3 km	MPC; JPL
864742	2015 BK_{282}	—	January 19, 2015	Haleakala	Pan-STARRS 1	·	1.7 km	MPC; JPL
864743	2015 BZ_{284}	—	October 20, 2008	Mount Lemmon	Mount Lemmon Survey	·	1.4 km	MPC; JPL
864744	2015 BW_{289}	—	January 19, 2015	Haleakala	Pan-STARRS 1	·	960 m	MPC; JPL
864745	2015 BK_{292}	—	January 19, 2015	Kitt Peak	Spacewatch	(5)	830 m	MPC; JPL
864746	2015 BA_{293}	—	January 19, 2015	Haleakala	Pan-STARRS 1	EUN	800 m	MPC; JPL
864747	2015 BO_{293}	—	January 19, 2015	Haleakala	Pan-STARRS 1	EUP	2.5 km	MPC; JPL
864748	2015 BJ_{294}	—	January 19, 2015	Haleakala	Pan-STARRS 1	T_{j} (2.99)	2.8 km	MPC; JPL
864749	2015 BN_{294}	—	November 30, 2014	Haleakala	Pan-STARRS 1	PHO	850 m	MPC; JPL
864750	2015 BN_{303}	—	January 20, 2006	Kitt Peak	Spacewatch	·	1.3 km	MPC; JPL
864751	2015 BF_{307}	—	January 20, 2015	Mount Lemmon	Mount Lemmon Survey	·	1.3 km	MPC; JPL
864752	2015 BM_{311}	—	December 21, 2014	Mount Lemmon	Mount Lemmon Survey	·	710 m	MPC; JPL
864753	2015 BE_{312}	—	January 16, 2015	Haleakala	Pan-STARRS 1	·	1.2 km	MPC; JPL
864754	2015 BD_{315}	—	October 23, 2008	Mount Lemmon	Mount Lemmon Survey	·	1.1 km	MPC; JPL
864755	2015 BX_{316}	—	July 13, 2013	Haleakala	Pan-STARRS 1	·	450 m	MPC; JPL
864756	2015 BJ_{321}	—	January 17, 2015	Haleakala	Pan-STARRS 1	HYG	2.0 km	MPC; JPL
864757	2015 BF_{324}	—	January 17, 2015	Haleakala	Pan-STARRS 1	·	550 m	MPC; JPL
864758	2015 BU_{324}	—	December 22, 2005	Kitt Peak	Spacewatch	·	1.1 km	MPC; JPL
864759	2015 BR_{325}	—	September 18, 2006	Kitt Peak	Spacewatch	·	530 m	MPC; JPL
864760	2015 BC_{329}	—	August 23, 2001	Kitt Peak	Spacewatch	V	480 m	MPC; JPL
864761	2015 BS_{329}	—	February 8, 2011	Mount Lemmon	Mount Lemmon Survey	·	880 m	MPC; JPL
864762	2015 BM_{330}	—	January 17, 2015	Haleakala	Pan-STARRS 1	·	530 m	MPC; JPL
864763	2015 BY_{330}	—	March 5, 2011	Mount Lemmon	Mount Lemmon Survey	·	1.2 km	MPC; JPL
864764	2015 BK_{331}	—	January 17, 2015	Haleakala	Pan-STARRS 1	·	1.1 km	MPC; JPL
864765	2015 BD_{333}	—	January 17, 2015	Haleakala	Pan-STARRS 1	·	1.4 km	MPC; JPL
864766	2015 BK_{338}	—	January 17, 2015	Haleakala	Pan-STARRS 1	·	1.4 km	MPC; JPL
864767	2015 BW_{338}	—	January 17, 2015	Haleakala	Pan-STARRS 1	V	470 m	MPC; JPL
864768	2015 BX_{338}	—	January 17, 2015	Haleakala	Pan-STARRS 1	·	2.2 km	MPC; JPL
864769	2015 BE_{345}	—	December 26, 2014	Haleakala	Pan-STARRS 1	·	2.3 km	MPC; JPL
864770	2015 BR_{345}	—	March 12, 2008	Kitt Peak	Spacewatch	·	870 m	MPC; JPL
864771	2015 BE_{347}	—	September 15, 2010	Kitt Peak	Spacewatch	·	500 m	MPC; JPL
864772	2015 BM_{349}	—	December 21, 2014	Haleakala	Pan-STARRS 1	·	610 m	MPC; JPL
864773	2015 BZ_{349}	—	January 18, 2015	Haleakala	Pan-STARRS 1	·	2.7 km	MPC; JPL
864774	2015 BF_{360}	—	October 5, 2013	Haleakala	Pan-STARRS 1	·	1.9 km	MPC; JPL
864775	2015 BG_{361}	—	September 24, 2006	Kitt Peak	Spacewatch	·	720 m	MPC; JPL
864776	2015 BW_{361}	—	January 20, 2015	Haleakala	Pan-STARRS 1	·	1.4 km	MPC; JPL
864777	2015 BG_{362}	—	April 13, 2012	Haleakala	Pan-STARRS 1	·	920 m	MPC; JPL
864778	2015 BD_{364}	—	December 26, 2014	Haleakala	Pan-STARRS 1	·	2.2 km	MPC; JPL
864779	2015 BE_{368}	—	December 29, 2014	Haleakala	Pan-STARRS 1	·	670 m	MPC; JPL
864780	2015 BN_{373}	—	January 20, 2015	Haleakala	Pan-STARRS 1	·	440 m	MPC; JPL
864781	2015 BG_{375}	—	January 20, 2015	Haleakala	Pan-STARRS 1	·	750 m	MPC; JPL
864782	2015 BM_{375}	—	December 29, 2014	Mount Lemmon	Mount Lemmon Survey	·	830 m	MPC; JPL
864783	2015 BK_{377}	—	August 31, 2013	Haleakala	Pan-STARRS 1	·	1.2 km	MPC; JPL
864784	2015 BU_{389}	—	March 14, 2007	Kitt Peak	Spacewatch	·	1.1 km	MPC; JPL
864785	2015 BM_{390}	—	February 17, 2004	Kitt Peak	Spacewatch	NYS	770 m	MPC; JPL
864786	2015 BP_{390}	—	January 20, 2015	Haleakala	Pan-STARRS 1	·	1.1 km	MPC; JPL
864787	2015 BD_{394}	—	February 9, 2011	Mount Lemmon	Mount Lemmon Survey	BAR	910 m	MPC; JPL
864788	2015 BZ_{397}	—	January 20, 2015	Haleakala	Pan-STARRS 1	·	1.7 km	MPC; JPL
864789	2015 BO_{398}	—	January 8, 2011	Mount Lemmon	Mount Lemmon Survey	·	880 m	MPC; JPL
864790	2015 BN_{399}	—	January 20, 2015	Haleakala	Pan-STARRS 1	·	2.7 km	MPC; JPL
864791	2015 BW_{401}	—	January 20, 2015	Haleakala	Pan-STARRS 1	HOF	2.0 km	MPC; JPL
864792	2015 BB_{403}	—	January 20, 2015	Haleakala	Pan-STARRS 1	·	1.7 km	MPC; JPL
864793	2015 BE_{403}	—	September 1, 2010	Mount Lemmon	Mount Lemmon Survey	·	530 m	MPC; JPL
864794	2015 BU_{405}	—	October 23, 2013	Mount Lemmon	Mount Lemmon Survey	·	1.5 km	MPC; JPL
864795	2015 BE_{418}	—	November 11, 2010	Mount Lemmon	Mount Lemmon Survey	NYS	550 m	MPC; JPL
864796	2015 BB_{421}	—	September 1, 2013	Mount Lemmon	Mount Lemmon Survey	·	1.2 km	MPC; JPL
864797	2015 BW_{425}	—	January 20, 2015	Haleakala	Pan-STARRS 1	·	840 m	MPC; JPL
864798	2015 BQ_{427}	—	January 20, 2015	Haleakala	Pan-STARRS 1	·	570 m	MPC; JPL
864799	2015 BU_{429}	—	March 10, 2011	Mount Lemmon	Mount Lemmon Survey	·	810 m	MPC; JPL
864800	2015 BL_{431}	—	January 20, 2015	Haleakala	Pan-STARRS 1	·	550 m	MPC; JPL

== 864801–864900 ==
back to top

Designation			Discovery			Properties		Ref
Permanent	Provisional	Named after	Date	Site	Discoverer(s)	Category	Diam.	Ref
864801	2015 BM_{431}	—	January 20, 2015	Haleakala	Pan-STARRS 1	EOS	1.4 km	MPC; JPL
864802	2015 BV_{431}	—	January 16, 2011	Mount Lemmon	Mount Lemmon Survey	·	890 m	MPC; JPL
864803	2015 BW_{434}	—	November 4, 2013	Mount Lemmon	Mount Lemmon Survey	·	1.2 km	MPC; JPL
864804	2015 BS_{435}	—	January 30, 2011	Mount Lemmon	Mount Lemmon Survey	·	910 m	MPC; JPL
864805	2015 BF_{437}	—	January 20, 2015	Haleakala	Pan-STARRS 1	·	550 m	MPC; JPL
864806	2015 BR_{438}	—	December 6, 2010	Mount Lemmon	Mount Lemmon Survey	·	870 m	MPC; JPL
864807	2015 BQ_{441}	—	January 20, 2015	Haleakala	Pan-STARRS 1	·	780 m	MPC; JPL
864808	2015 BW_{443}	—	January 20, 2015	Haleakala	Pan-STARRS 1	·	730 m	MPC; JPL
864809	2015 BT_{444}	—	January 20, 2015	Haleakala	Pan-STARRS 1	·	880 m	MPC; JPL
864810	2015 BK_{445}	—	April 14, 2008	Kitt Peak	Spacewatch	·	830 m	MPC; JPL
864811	2015 BC_{451}	—	January 20, 2015	Haleakala	Pan-STARRS 1	·	880 m	MPC; JPL
864812	2015 BB_{455}	—	January 20, 2015	Haleakala	Pan-STARRS 1	·	490 m	MPC; JPL
864813	2015 BO_{455}	—	January 20, 2015	Haleakala	Pan-STARRS 1	·	650 m	MPC; JPL
864814	2015 BS_{458}	—	January 20, 2015	Haleakala	Pan-STARRS 1	·	2.0 km	MPC; JPL
864815	2015 BS_{460}	—	January 20, 2015	Kitt Peak	Spacewatch	TIR	1.9 km	MPC; JPL
864816	2015 BN_{461}	—	December 22, 2008	Kitt Peak	Spacewatch	·	2.1 km	MPC; JPL
864817	2015 BE_{462}	—	January 20, 2015	Haleakala	Pan-STARRS 1	·	1.0 km	MPC; JPL
864818	2015 BG_{463}	—	February 14, 2004	Kitt Peak	Spacewatch	H	440 m	MPC; JPL
864819	2015 BJ_{464}	—	January 20, 2015	Haleakala	Pan-STARRS 1	·	2.4 km	MPC; JPL
864820	2015 BZ_{465}	—	January 20, 2015	Haleakala	Pan-STARRS 1	·	2.7 km	MPC; JPL
864821	2015 BW_{466}	—	January 20, 2015	Haleakala	Pan-STARRS 1	PHO	750 m	MPC; JPL
864822	2015 BY_{471}	—	November 2, 2010	Mount Lemmon	Mount Lemmon Survey	·	420 m	MPC; JPL
864823	2015 BR_{473}	—	January 30, 2011	Haleakala	Pan-STARRS 1	·	880 m	MPC; JPL
864824	2015 BD_{474}	—	March 4, 2005	Mount Lemmon	Mount Lemmon Survey	·	440 m	MPC; JPL
864825	2015 BM_{476}	—	March 30, 2008	Kitt Peak	Spacewatch	·	880 m	MPC; JPL
864826	2015 BM_{480}	—	August 13, 2012	Haleakala	Pan-STARRS 1	·	2.0 km	MPC; JPL
864827	2015 BU_{481}	—	November 30, 1999	Kitt Peak	Spacewatch	NYS	680 m	MPC; JPL
864828	2015 BU_{482}	—	October 10, 2013	Haleakala	Pan-STARRS 1	·	1.5 km	MPC; JPL
864829	2015 BG_{486}	—	January 20, 2015	Haleakala	Pan-STARRS 1	·	2.8 km	MPC; JPL
864830	2015 BT_{490}	—	March 30, 2011	Mount Lemmon	Mount Lemmon Survey	·	1.2 km	MPC; JPL
864831	2015 BV_{494}	—	January 20, 2015	Haleakala	Pan-STARRS 1	·	1.4 km	MPC; JPL
864832	2015 BQ_{495}	—	April 9, 2008	Kitt Peak	Spacewatch	MAS	500 m	MPC; JPL
864833	2015 BJ_{497}	—	December 14, 2010	Mount Lemmon	Mount Lemmon Survey	MAS	500 m	MPC; JPL
864834	2015 BL_{501}	—	January 20, 2015	Haleakala	Pan-STARRS 1	·	1.4 km	MPC; JPL
864835	2015 BX_{504}	—	November 7, 2010	Kitt Peak	Spacewatch	·	630 m	MPC; JPL
864836	2015 BZ_{504}	—	January 20, 2015	Haleakala	Pan-STARRS 1	MAS	470 m	MPC; JPL
864837	2015 BP_{506}	—	January 20, 2015	Haleakala	Pan-STARRS 1	·	810 m	MPC; JPL
864838	2015 BY_{506}	—	January 20, 2015	Haleakala	Pan-STARRS 1	·	490 m	MPC; JPL
864839	2015 BF_{508}	—	February 7, 2008	Mount Lemmon	Mount Lemmon Survey	·	550 m	MPC; JPL
864840	2015 BM_{517}	—	June 27, 2011	Mount Lemmon	Mount Lemmon Survey	·	2.0 km	MPC; JPL
864841	2015 BL_{520}	—	January 21, 2015	Haleakala	Pan-STARRS 1	H	320 m	MPC; JPL
864842	2015 BX_{520}	—	January 16, 2015	Mount Lemmon	Mount Lemmon Survey	H	410 m	MPC; JPL
864843	2015 BB_{521}	—	January 2, 2012	Mount Lemmon	Mount Lemmon Survey	H	330 m	MPC; JPL
864844	2015 BF_{521}	—	February 26, 2004	Kitt Peak	Deep Ecliptic Survey	H	330 m	MPC; JPL
864845	2015 BE_{527}	—	January 24, 2015	Haleakala	Pan-STARRS 1	H	400 m	MPC; JPL
864846	2015 BR_{527}	—	January 20, 2015	Haleakala	Pan-STARRS 1	H	410 m	MPC; JPL
864847	2015 BP_{528}	—	January 25, 2015	Haleakala	Pan-STARRS 1	·	610 m	MPC; JPL
864848	2015 BE_{529}	—	September 14, 2013	Haleakala	Pan-STARRS 1	·	1.4 km	MPC; JPL
864849	2015 BR_{531}	—	January 23, 2015	Haleakala	Pan-STARRS 1	·	1.1 km	MPC; JPL
864850	2015 BQ_{546}	—	January 20, 2015	Mount Lemmon	Mount Lemmon Survey	·	1.0 km	MPC; JPL
864851	2015 BT_{546}	—	January 20, 2015	Haleakala	Pan-STARRS 1	·	2.6 km	MPC; JPL
864852	2015 BD_{548}	—	March 25, 2007	Mount Lemmon	Mount Lemmon Survey	·	1.1 km	MPC; JPL
864853	2015 BH_{551}	—	January 23, 2015	Haleakala	Pan-STARRS 1	MAR	670 m	MPC; JPL
864854	2015 BJ_{552}	—	January 17, 2015	Haleakala	Pan-STARRS 1	·	1.2 km	MPC; JPL
864855	2015 BN_{553}	—	December 29, 2014	Haleakala	Pan-STARRS 1	EUN	840 m	MPC; JPL
864856	2015 BS_{553}	—	December 29, 2014	Mount Lemmon	Mount Lemmon Survey	·	460 m	MPC; JPL
864857	2015 BV_{554}	—	October 13, 2010	Mount Lemmon	Mount Lemmon Survey	V	430 m	MPC; JPL
864858	2015 BY_{556}	—	January 17, 2015	Haleakala	Pan-STARRS 1	·	920 m	MPC; JPL
864859	2015 BS_{557}	—	January 17, 2015	Haleakala	Pan-STARRS 1	·	1.4 km	MPC; JPL
864860	2015 BG_{558}	—	November 6, 2010	Mount Lemmon	Mount Lemmon Survey	·	810 m	MPC; JPL
864861	2015 BT_{564}	—	December 29, 2014	Haleakala	Pan-STARRS 1	·	2.3 km	MPC; JPL
864862	2015 BN_{565}	—	January 23, 2015	Haleakala	Pan-STARRS 1	·	430 m	MPC; JPL
864863	2015 BU_{565}	—	September 22, 2014	Roque de los Muchachos	EURONEAR	PHO	900 m	MPC; JPL
864864	2015 BZ_{568}	—	August 14, 2010	Kitt Peak	Spacewatch	·	530 m	MPC; JPL
864865	2015 BB_{569}	—	January 22, 2015	Haleakala	Pan-STARRS 1	·	740 m	MPC; JPL
864866	2015 BL_{569}	—	January 23, 2015	Haleakala	Pan-STARRS 1	·	490 m	MPC; JPL
864867	2015 BU_{570}	—	January 28, 2015	Haleakala	Pan-STARRS 1	·	1.1 km	MPC; JPL
864868	2015 BX_{571}	—	January 22, 2015	Haleakala	Pan-STARRS 1	·	2.1 km	MPC; JPL
864869	2015 BA_{573}	—	January 20, 2015	Haleakala	Pan-STARRS 1	·	900 m	MPC; JPL
864870	2015 BM_{573}	—	January 17, 2015	Haleakala	Pan-STARRS 1	·	410 m	MPC; JPL
864871	2015 BU_{574}	—	January 25, 2015	Haleakala	Pan-STARRS 1	·	690 m	MPC; JPL
864872	2015 BF_{575}	—	January 28, 2015	Haleakala	Pan-STARRS 1	·	2.3 km	MPC; JPL
864873	2015 BW_{576}	—	January 17, 2015	Haleakala	Pan-STARRS 1	·	1.0 km	MPC; JPL
864874	2015 BY_{577}	—	December 23, 2014	Kitt Peak	Spacewatch	·	2.0 km	MPC; JPL
864875	2015 BL_{579}	—	March 28, 2004	Socorro	LINEAR	·	960 m	MPC; JPL
864876	2015 BS_{579}	—	January 16, 2015	Haleakala	Pan-STARRS 1	·	1.8 km	MPC; JPL
864877	2015 BJ_{580}	—	December 27, 2005	Kitt Peak	Spacewatch	·	1.1 km	MPC; JPL
864878	2015 BU_{588}	—	January 23, 2015	Mount Lemmon	Mount Lemmon Survey	·	2.4 km	MPC; JPL
864879	2015 BN_{589}	—	January 20, 2015	Haleakala	Pan-STARRS 1	·	1.2 km	MPC; JPL
864880	2015 BL_{591}	—	January 23, 2015	Haleakala	Pan-STARRS 1	·	2.3 km	MPC; JPL
864881	2015 BE_{595}	—	January 17, 2015	Mount Lemmon	Mount Lemmon Survey	·	2.1 km	MPC; JPL
864882	2015 BU_{596}	—	January 17, 2015	Haleakala	Pan-STARRS 1	·	1.4 km	MPC; JPL
864883	2015 BK_{597}	—	January 28, 2015	Haleakala	Pan-STARRS 1	·	1.6 km	MPC; JPL
864884	2015 BR_{598}	—	January 26, 2015	Haleakala	Pan-STARRS 1	GEF	860 m	MPC; JPL
864885	2015 BB_{601}	—	January 28, 2015	Haleakala	Pan-STARRS 1	·	580 m	MPC; JPL
864886	2015 BT_{601}	—	January 29, 2015	Haleakala	Pan-STARRS 1	·	600 m	MPC; JPL
864887	2015 BF_{603}	—	January 17, 2015	Haleakala	Pan-STARRS 1	·	2.0 km	MPC; JPL
864888	2015 BQ_{604}	—	January 27, 2015	Haleakala	Pan-STARRS 1	·	1.0 km	MPC; JPL
864889	2015 BV_{608}	—	January 22, 2015	Haleakala	Pan-STARRS 1	·	1.3 km	MPC; JPL
864890	2015 BZ_{608}	—	January 20, 2015	Haleakala	Pan-STARRS 1	H	350 m	MPC; JPL
864891	2015 BM_{615}	—	January 19, 2015	Mount Lemmon	Mount Lemmon Survey	·	1.5 km	MPC; JPL
864892	2015 BH_{617}	—	January 22, 2015	Haleakala	Pan-STARRS 1	·	510 m	MPC; JPL
864893	2015 BJ_{618}	—	January 25, 2015	Haleakala	Pan-STARRS 1	HNS	760 m	MPC; JPL
864894	2015 BN_{619}	—	January 17, 2015	Mount Lemmon	Mount Lemmon Survey	·	470 m	MPC; JPL
864895	2015 CW	—	December 22, 2003	Kitt Peak	Spacewatch	H	450 m	MPC; JPL
864896	2015 CG_{6}	—	January 19, 2015	Mount Lemmon	Mount Lemmon Survey	NYS	600 m	MPC; JPL
864897	2015 CE_{8}	—	January 18, 2015	Mount Lemmon	Mount Lemmon Survey	·	1.1 km	MPC; JPL
864898	2015 CS_{9}	—	January 16, 2015	Haleakala	Pan-STARRS 1	HYG	1.8 km	MPC; JPL
864899	2015 CW_{11}	—	February 10, 2015	Mount Lemmon	Mount Lemmon Survey	MAS	510 m	MPC; JPL
864900	2015 CF_{15}	—	November 25, 2014	Haleakala	Pan-STARRS 1	EUP	2.6 km	MPC; JPL

== 864901–865000 ==
back to top

Designation			Discovery			Properties		Ref
Permanent	Provisional	Named after	Date	Site	Discoverer(s)	Category	Diam.	Ref
864901	2015 CK_{18}	—	November 6, 2010	Mount Lemmon	Mount Lemmon Survey	·	740 m	MPC; JPL
864902	2015 CL_{20}	—	January 14, 2015	Haleakala	Pan-STARRS 1	·	1.8 km	MPC; JPL
864903	2015 CT_{24}	—	February 10, 2015	Mount Lemmon	Mount Lemmon Survey	·	720 m	MPC; JPL
864904	2015 CS_{27}	—	December 29, 2008	Mount Lemmon	Mount Lemmon Survey	·	2.6 km	MPC; JPL
864905	2015 CM_{29}	—	April 5, 2005	Mount Lemmon	Mount Lemmon Survey	·	540 m	MPC; JPL
864906	2015 CA_{32}	—	December 11, 2009	Mount Lemmon	Mount Lemmon Survey	·	1.1 km	MPC; JPL
864907	2015 CJ_{32}	—	January 13, 2008	Kitt Peak	Spacewatch	·	540 m	MPC; JPL
864908	2015 CP_{33}	—	January 23, 2015	Haleakala	Pan-STARRS 1	·	1.1 km	MPC; JPL
864909	2015 CU_{34}	—	January 11, 2015	Haleakala	Pan-STARRS 1	T_{j} (2.89)	1.8 km	MPC; JPL
864910	2015 CX_{34}	—	November 23, 2014	Haleakala	Pan-STARRS 1	H	440 m	MPC; JPL
864911	2015 CH_{35}	—	January 17, 2004	Palomar	NEAT	·	2.8 km	MPC; JPL
864912	2015 CD_{36}	—	February 12, 2015	Haleakala	Pan-STARRS 1	EUN	930 m	MPC; JPL
864913	2015 CK_{37}	—	August 5, 2005	Palomar	NEAT	H	540 m	MPC; JPL
864914	2015 CZ_{38}	—	January 25, 2015	Haleakala	Pan-STARRS 1	·	1.2 km	MPC; JPL
864915	2015 CV_{41}	—	January 22, 2015	Haleakala	Pan-STARRS 1	MAS	570 m	MPC; JPL
864916	2015 CL_{45}	—	February 8, 2002	Kitt Peak	Spacewatch	·	920 m	MPC; JPL
864917	2015 CZ_{48}	—	January 27, 2015	Haleakala	Pan-STARRS 1	PHO	930 m	MPC; JPL
864918	2015 CU_{49}	—	September 17, 2012	Mount Lemmon	Mount Lemmon Survey	T_{j} (2.98) · 3:2	4.3 km	MPC; JPL
864919	2015 CU_{52}	—	January 25, 2015	Haleakala	Pan-STARRS 1	EUN	940 m	MPC; JPL
864920	2015 CF_{57}	—	February 2, 2006	Kitt Peak	Spacewatch	JUN	750 m	MPC; JPL
864921	2015 CU_{59}	—	January 29, 2015	Haleakala	Pan-STARRS 1	·	550 m	MPC; JPL
864922	2015 CC_{67}	—	January 13, 2011	Kitt Peak	Spacewatch	MAS	470 m	MPC; JPL
864923	2015 CZ_{68}	—	January 22, 2015	Haleakala	Pan-STARRS 1	·	490 m	MPC; JPL
864924	2015 CM_{69}	—	January 25, 2015	Haleakala	Pan-STARRS 1	·	820 m	MPC; JPL
864925	2015 CF_{70}	—	September 25, 2013	Mount Lemmon	Mount Lemmon Survey	V	380 m	MPC; JPL
864926	2015 CJ_{72}	—	February 11, 2015	Haleakala	Pan-STARRS 1	EOS	1.7 km	MPC; JPL
864927	2015 CY_{78}	—	January 23, 2015	Haleakala	Pan-STARRS 1	·	820 m	MPC; JPL
864928	2015 CL_{82}	—	February 12, 2015	Haleakala	Pan-STARRS 1	V	400 m	MPC; JPL
864929	2015 CM_{82}	—	February 12, 2015	Haleakala	Pan-STARRS 1	LEO	1.0 km	MPC; JPL
864930	2015 DM_{1}	—	September 3, 2008	Kitt Peak	Spacewatch	H	340 m	MPC; JPL
864931	2015 DH_{2}	—	August 20, 2001	Cerro Tololo	Deep Ecliptic Survey	·	780 m	MPC; JPL
864932	2015 DP_{2}	—	February 8, 2011	Mount Lemmon	Mount Lemmon Survey	·	990 m	MPC; JPL
864933	2015 DZ_{4}	—	January 1, 2008	Kitt Peak	Spacewatch	·	410 m	MPC; JPL
864934	2015 DU_{5}	—	February 8, 2015	Mount Lemmon	Mount Lemmon Survey	·	2.5 km	MPC; JPL
864935	2015 DF_{13}	—	January 20, 2015	Haleakala	Pan-STARRS 1	·	450 m	MPC; JPL
864936	2015 DQ_{14}	—	February 20, 2010	Kitt Peak	Spacewatch	·	1.5 km	MPC; JPL
864937	2015 DF_{16}	—	January 20, 2015	Haleakala	Pan-STARRS 1	·	710 m	MPC; JPL
864938 Giuseppekoch	2015 DK_{16}	Giuseppekoch	January 17, 2015	Mount Graham	K. Černis, R. P. Boyle	·	1.5 km	MPC; JPL
864939	2015 DE_{18}	—	January 29, 2015	Haleakala	Pan-STARRS 1	·	2.3 km	MPC; JPL
864940	2015 DR_{18}	—	January 24, 2015	Mount Lemmon	Mount Lemmon Survey	·	480 m	MPC; JPL
864941	2015 DA_{20}	—	January 27, 2015	Haleakala	Pan-STARRS 1	·	1.4 km	MPC; JPL
864942	2015 DE_{20}	—	February 16, 2015	Haleakala	Pan-STARRS 1	·	1.4 km	MPC; JPL
864943	2015 DR_{20}	—	February 16, 2015	Haleakala	Pan-STARRS 1	·	2.0 km	MPC; JPL
864944	2015 DE_{25}	—	August 17, 2012	Haleakala	Pan-STARRS 1	HOF	1.7 km	MPC; JPL
864945	2015 DY_{27}	—	January 29, 2015	Haleakala	Pan-STARRS 1	V	440 m	MPC; JPL
864946	2015 DT_{29}	—	April 3, 2011	Haleakala	Pan-STARRS 1	·	1.1 km	MPC; JPL
864947	2015 DW_{30}	—	October 23, 2009	Kitt Peak	Spacewatch	·	1.1 km	MPC; JPL
864948	2015 DN_{38}	—	March 4, 2008	Mount Lemmon	Mount Lemmon Survey	·	550 m	MPC; JPL
864949	2015 DQ_{38}	—	February 16, 2015	Haleakala	Pan-STARRS 1	·	1.0 km	MPC; JPL
864950	2015 DG_{39}	—	February 16, 2015	Haleakala	Pan-STARRS 1	·	2.5 km	MPC; JPL
864951	2015 DP_{43}	—	September 6, 2008	Kitt Peak	Spacewatch	H	370 m	MPC; JPL
864952	2015 DJ_{47}	—	March 4, 2000	Socorro	LINEAR	PHO	890 m	MPC; JPL
864953	2015 DY_{48}	—	February 3, 2009	Mount Lemmon	Mount Lemmon Survey	·	2.6 km	MPC; JPL
864954	2015 DE_{50}	—	January 14, 2011	Kitt Peak	Spacewatch	·	870 m	MPC; JPL
864955	2015 DL_{55}	—	January 19, 2015	Kitt Peak	Spacewatch	·	1.2 km	MPC; JPL
864956	2015 DV_{57}	—	January 13, 2008	Kitt Peak	Spacewatch	·	470 m	MPC; JPL
864957	2015 DM_{60}	—	January 16, 2015	Haleakala	Pan-STARRS 1	HNS	770 m	MPC; JPL
864958	2015 DL_{61}	—	January 19, 2015	Kitt Peak	Spacewatch	·	840 m	MPC; JPL
864959	2015 DX_{65}	—	February 28, 2008	Mount Lemmon	Mount Lemmon Survey	·	680 m	MPC; JPL
864960	2015 DC_{66}	—	April 15, 2007	Kitt Peak	Spacewatch	·	990 m	MPC; JPL
864961	2015 DY_{66}	—	March 6, 2008	Mount Lemmon	Mount Lemmon Survey	·	550 m	MPC; JPL
864962	2015 DU_{67}	—	September 1, 2013	Mount Lemmon	Mount Lemmon Survey	·	990 m	MPC; JPL
864963	2015 DB_{69}	—	September 25, 2006	Kitt Peak	Spacewatch	MAS	570 m	MPC; JPL
864964	2015 DD_{70}	—	January 16, 2015	Haleakala	Pan-STARRS 1	NYS	800 m	MPC; JPL
864965	2015 DY_{74}	—	January 10, 2011	Mount Lemmon	Mount Lemmon Survey	·	890 m	MPC; JPL
864966	2015 DN_{75}	—	January 25, 2006	Kitt Peak	Spacewatch	·	1.1 km	MPC; JPL
864967	2015 DA_{76}	—	March 14, 2004	Kitt Peak	Spacewatch	ERI	1.1 km	MPC; JPL
864968	2015 DP_{76}	—	January 19, 2015	Kitt Peak	Spacewatch	·	710 m	MPC; JPL
864969	2015 DT_{76}	—	January 20, 2015	Haleakala	Pan-STARRS 1	NYS	860 m	MPC; JPL
864970	2015 DA_{79}	—	October 4, 2013	Mount Lemmon	Mount Lemmon Survey	·	900 m	MPC; JPL
864971	2015 DC_{79}	—	May 4, 2005	Mount Lemmon	Mount Lemmon Survey	·	490 m	MPC; JPL
864972	2015 DJ_{80}	—	April 5, 2005	Mount Lemmon	Mount Lemmon Survey	·	1.3 km	MPC; JPL
864973	2015 DG_{83}	—	March 29, 2008	Kitt Peak	Spacewatch	MAS	490 m	MPC; JPL
864974	2015 DM_{86}	—	January 7, 2009	Kitt Peak	Spacewatch	THM	1.7 km	MPC; JPL
864975	2015 DZ_{91}	—	September 18, 2010	Mount Lemmon	Mount Lemmon Survey	·	420 m	MPC; JPL
864976	2015 DH_{92}	—	August 9, 2013	Haleakala	Pan-STARRS 1	·	410 m	MPC; JPL
864977	2015 DK_{98}	—	February 16, 2015	Haleakala	Pan-STARRS 1	·	890 m	MPC; JPL
864978	2015 DW_{103}	—	January 20, 2015	Catalina	CSS	·	1.1 km	MPC; JPL
864979	2015 DY_{104}	—	January 20, 2015	Mount Lemmon	Mount Lemmon Survey	·	2.4 km	MPC; JPL
864980	2015 DE_{106}	—	April 20, 2012	Mount Lemmon	Mount Lemmon Survey	·	720 m	MPC; JPL
864981	2015 DL_{109}	—	December 3, 2013	Haleakala	Pan-STARRS 1	·	2.4 km	MPC; JPL
864982	2015 DD_{110}	—	January 27, 2015	Haleakala	Pan-STARRS 1	HNS	730 m	MPC; JPL
864983	2015 DN_{111}	—	January 27, 2015	Haleakala	Pan-STARRS 1	MAR	750 m	MPC; JPL
864984	2015 DR_{113}	—	January 15, 2015	Haleakala	Pan-STARRS 1	·	2.6 km	MPC; JPL
864985	2015 DS_{113}	—	January 27, 2015	Haleakala	Pan-STARRS 1	·	440 m	MPC; JPL
864986	2015 DF_{119}	—	February 17, 2015	Haleakala	Pan-STARRS 1	·	1.1 km	MPC; JPL
864987	2015 DZ_{120}	—	October 3, 2013	Mount Lemmon	Mount Lemmon Survey	·	2.0 km	MPC; JPL
864988	2015 DM_{124}	—	February 17, 2015	Haleakala	Pan-STARRS 1	·	800 m	MPC; JPL
864989	2015 DC_{125}	—	February 17, 2015	Haleakala	Pan-STARRS 1	·	510 m	MPC; JPL
864990	2015 DP_{128}	—	January 19, 2015	Haleakala	Pan-STARRS 1	·	1.3 km	MPC; JPL
864991	2015 DR_{137}	—	February 17, 2015	Haleakala	Pan-STARRS 1	PHO	490 m	MPC; JPL
864992	2015 DC_{143}	—	December 21, 2014	Haleakala	Pan-STARRS 1	HNS	800 m	MPC; JPL
864993	2015 DY_{144}	—	December 18, 2001	Socorro	LINEAR	·	1.3 km	MPC; JPL
864994	2015 DP_{145}	—	December 4, 2008	Mount Lemmon	Mount Lemmon Survey	·	2.3 km	MPC; JPL
864995	2015 DW_{146}	—	December 26, 2014	Haleakala	Pan-STARRS 1	·	700 m	MPC; JPL
864996	2015 DN_{147}	—	December 18, 2014	Haleakala	Pan-STARRS 1	·	930 m	MPC; JPL
864997 Józefmaj	2015 DT_{147}	Józefmaj	November 18, 2014	Mount Graham	K. Černis, Boyle, R. P.	·	1.0 km	MPC; JPL
864998	2015 DU_{155}	—	January 8, 2010	Kitt Peak	Spacewatch	H	300 m	MPC; JPL
864999	2015 DN_{158}	—	February 18, 2015	Haleakala	Pan-STARRS 1	·	1.1 km	MPC; JPL
865000	2015 DY_{158}	—	February 18, 2015	Haleakala	Pan-STARRS 1	·	1.8 km	MPC; JPL

== Meaning of names ==
As minor planet discoveries are confirmed, they are given a permanent number by the IAU's Minor Planet Center (MPC), and the discoverers can then submit names for them, following the IAU's naming conventions. The list below concerns those minor planets in the specified number-range that have received names, and explains the meanings of those names.

Official naming citations of newly named small Solar System bodies are approved and published in a bulletin by IAU's Working Group for Small Bodies Nomenclature (WGSBN). Before May 2021, citations were published in MPC's Minor Planet Circulars for many decades. Recent citations can also be found on the JPL Small-Body Database (SBDB). Until his death in 2016, German astronomer Lutz D. Schmadel compiled these citations into the Dictionary of Minor Planet Names (DMP) and regularly updated the collection.

Based on Paul Herget's The Names of the Minor Planets, Schmadel also researched the unclear origin of numerous asteroids, most of which had been named prior to World War II. This article incorporates text from this source, which is in the public domain: SBDB New namings may only be added to this list below after official publication as the preannouncement of names is condemned. The WGSBN publishes a comprehensive guideline for the naming rules of non-cometary small Solar System bodies.

Named minor planet	Provisional	This minor planet was named for...	Ref; Catalog
864404 Paulmueller	2014 YB_{43}	Fr. Paul R. Mueller, American Jesuit priest, physicist, and philosopher of science.	IAU · 864938
864938 Giuseppekoch	2015 DK_{16}	Fr. Giuseppe Koch, Italian Jesuit priest and physicist.	IAU · 864938
864997 Józefmaj	2015 DT_{147}	Fr. Józef Marian Maj, Polish Jesuit priest.	IAU · 864997

back to top
