= List of minor planets: 867001–868000 =

The following is a partial list of minor planets, running from minor-planet number 867001 through 868000, inclusive. The primary data for this and other partial lists is based on JPL's "Small-Body Orbital Elements" and data available from the Minor Planet Center. Critical list information is also provided by the MPC, unless otherwise specified from Lowell Observatory. A detailed description of the table's columns and additional sources are given on the main page including a complete list of every page in this series, and a statistical break-up on the dynamical classification of minor planets.

Also see the summary list of all named bodies in numerical and alphabetical order, and the corresponding naming citations for the number range of this particular list. New namings may only be added to this list after official publication, as the preannouncement of names is condemned by the Working Group for Small Bodies Nomenclature of the International Astronomical Union.

Near-Earth obj.	MBA (inner)	MBA (outer)	Centaur
Mars-crosser	MBA (middle)	Jupiter trojan	Trans-Neptunian obj.
Unclassified

== 867001–867100 ==
Designation			Discovery			Properties		Ref
Permanent	Provisional	Named after	Date	Site	Discoverer(s)	Category	Diam.	Ref
867001	2015 TQ_{473}	—	October 9, 2015	Haleakala	Pan-STARRS 1	·	580 m	MPC · JPL
867002	2015 TZ_{474}	—	October 10, 2015	Haleakala	Pan-STARRS 1	·	450 m	MPC · JPL
867003	2015 TC_{478}	—	October 8, 2015	Haleakala	Pan-STARRS 1	·	1.5 km	MPC · JPL
867004	2015 TZ_{479}	—	October 12, 2015	Haleakala	Pan-STARRS 1	·	1.3 km	MPC · JPL
867005	2015 TG_{484}	—	October 15, 2015	Haleakala	Pan-STARRS 1	·	1.3 km	MPC · JPL
867006	2015 TZ_{486}	—	October 9, 2015	Haleakala	Pan-STARRS 1	VER	2.1 km	MPC · JPL
867007	2015 TE_{487}	—	October 10, 2015	Haleakala	Pan-STARRS 1	·	440 m	MPC · JPL
867008	2015 TN_{487}	—	October 9, 2015	Haleakala	Pan-STARRS 1	·	1.8 km	MPC · JPL
867009	2015 TL_{499}	—	October 10, 2015	Haleakala	Pan-STARRS 1	·	1.2 km	MPC · JPL
867010	2015 UA_{3}	—	May 7, 2014	Haleakala	Pan-STARRS 1	·	790 m	MPC · JPL
867011	2015 UF_{3}	—	October 31, 2007	Mount Lemmon	Mount Lemmon Survey	·	680 m	MPC · JPL
867012	2015 UZ_{5}	—	October 16, 2015	XuYi Statio	PMO NEO Survey Program	·	1.4 km	MPC · JPL
867013	2015 UG_{6}	—	October 3, 2011	Mount Lemmon	Mount Lemmon Survey	·	880 m	MPC · JPL
867014	2015 UZ_{7}	—	September 11, 2015	Haleakala	Pan-STARRS 1	·	1.0 km	MPC · JPL
867015	2015 UN_{17}	—	September 11, 2015	Haleakala	Pan-STARRS 1	·	860 m	MPC · JPL
867016	2015 UQ_{19}	—	October 25, 2005	Mount Lemmon	Mount Lemmon Survey	·	530 m	MPC · JPL
867017	2015 UX_{20}	—	September 23, 2015	Haleakala	Pan-STARRS 1	H	440 m	MPC · JPL
867018	2015 UU_{21}	—	August 12, 2015	Haleakala	Pan-STARRS 1	NYS	870 m	MPC · JPL
867019	2015 UK_{22}	—	October 18, 2015	Haleakala	Pan-STARRS 1	·	1.5 km	MPC · JPL
867020	2015 UM_{22}	—	October 18, 2015	Haleakala	Pan-STARRS 1	KOR	1.1 km	MPC · JPL
867021	2015 UD_{23}	—	September 11, 2015	Haleakala	Pan-STARRS 1	·	1.4 km	MPC · JPL
867022	2015 UR_{23}	—	September 22, 2008	Kitt Peak	Spacewatch	·	440 m	MPC · JPL
867023	2015 UU_{24}	—	October 25, 2011	Haleakala	Pan-STARRS 1	EUN	870 m	MPC · JPL
867024	2015 UC_{25}	—	October 18, 2015	Haleakala	Pan-STARRS 1	EOS	1.6 km	MPC · JPL
867025	2015 UJ_{32}	—	February 26, 2014	Haleakala	Pan-STARRS 1	NYS	820 m	MPC · JPL
867026	2015 UP_{32}	—	October 2, 2015	Kitt Peak	Spacewatch	MAS	490 m	MPC · JPL
867027	2015 UR_{32}	—	September 9, 2015	Haleakala	Pan-STARRS 1	V	370 m	MPC · JPL
867028	2015 UW_{34}	—	November 3, 2005	Kitt Peak	Spacewatch	KOR	1 km	MPC · JPL
867029	2015 UY_{34}	—	June 24, 2014	Haleakala	Pan-STARRS 1	·	1.3 km	MPC · JPL
867030	2015 UM_{37}	—	September 12, 2015	Haleakala	Pan-STARRS 1	·	1.2 km	MPC · JPL
867031	2015 UL_{39}	—	September 12, 2015	Haleakala	Pan-STARRS 1	AGN	770 m	MPC · JPL
867032	2015 UQ_{41}	—	October 18, 2015	Haleakala	Pan-STARRS 1	AGN	860 m	MPC · JPL
867033	2015 UR_{42}	—	October 10, 2015	Haleakala	Pan-STARRS 1	·	2.2 km	MPC · JPL
867034	2015 UF_{43}	—	October 9, 2015	Haleakala	Pan-STARRS 1	·	1.7 km	MPC · JPL
867035	2015 UT_{43}	—	October 9, 2015	Haleakala	Pan-STARRS 1	·	460 m	MPC · JPL
867036	2015 UZ_{44}	—	June 30, 2014	Haleakala	Pan-STARRS 1	·	2.0 km	MPC · JPL
867037	2015 UA_{45}	—	November 26, 2005	Kitt Peak	Spacewatch	EOS	1.4 km	MPC · JPL
867038	2015 UX_{45}	—	November 8, 2010	Mount Lemmon	Mount Lemmon Survey	·	1.3 km	MPC · JPL
867039	2015 UT_{47}	—	October 8, 2015	Haleakala	Pan-STARRS 1	·	1.5 km	MPC · JPL
867040	2015 UT_{48}	—	October 9, 2015	Haleakala	Pan-STARRS 1	·	1.4 km	MPC · JPL
867041	2015 UL_{49}	—	October 18, 2015	Haleakala	Pan-STARRS 1	T_{j} (2.99) · (895)	2.2 km	MPC · JPL
867042	2015 UX_{52}	—	July 19, 2015	Haleakala	Pan-STARRS 1	H	320 m	MPC · JPL
867043	2015 UP_{55}	—	September 12, 2015	Haleakala	Pan-STARRS 1	MAS	500 m	MPC · JPL
867044	2015 UG_{56}	—	September 12, 2015	Haleakala	Pan-STARRS 1	·	500 m	MPC · JPL
867045	2015 UK_{56}	—	March 20, 2010	Mount Lemmon	Mount Lemmon Survey	·	530 m	MPC · JPL
867046	2015 UL_{56}	—	September 12, 2015	Haleakala	Pan-STARRS 1	·	1.2 km	MPC · JPL
867047	2015 UM_{69}	—	October 30, 2011	Mount Lemmon	Mount Lemmon Survey	·	1.8 km	MPC · JPL
867048	2015 UH_{70}	—	March 25, 2014	Mount Lemmon	Mount Lemmon Survey	H	410 m	MPC · JPL
867049	2015 UT_{76}	—	September 6, 2008	Mount Lemmon	Mount Lemmon Survey	·	500 m	MPC · JPL
867050	2015 UW_{76}	—	October 24, 2015	Haleakala	Pan-STARRS 1	T_{j} (2.99)	3.1 km	MPC · JPL
867051	2015 UD_{77}	—	September 30, 2005	Mount Lemmon	Mount Lemmon Survey	·	490 m	MPC · JPL
867052	2015 UX_{78}	—	October 24, 2015	Haleakala	Pan-STARRS 1	·	1.5 km	MPC · JPL
867053	2015 UX_{79}	—	August 12, 2015	Haleakala	Pan-STARRS 1	EUN	840 m	MPC · JPL
867054	2015 UD_{82}	—	September 7, 1997	Parc National des Cévennes	A. M. Jacquey, B. Gaillard	·	770 m	MPC · JPL
867055	2015 UH_{83}	—	September 23, 2015	Haleakala	Pan-STARRS 1	BRA	1.1 km	MPC · JPL
867056	2015 UA_{84}	—	December 5, 2002	Kitt Peak	Deep Ecliptic Survey	·	1.1 km	MPC · JPL
867057	2015 UQ_{84}	—	October 24, 2015	Haleakala	Pan-STARRS 1	H	330 m	MPC · JPL
867058	2015 UH_{85}	—	April 10, 2014	Haleakala	Pan-STARRS 1	H	470 m	MPC · JPL
867059	2015 UX_{85}	—	October 21, 2015	Haleakala	Pan-STARRS 1	·	1.4 km	MPC · JPL
867060	2015 UB_{86}	—	April 16, 2013	Cerro Tololo-DECam	DECam	·	1.9 km	MPC · JPL
867061	2015 UN_{86}	—	July 25, 2014	Haleakala	Pan-STARRS 1	·	2.1 km	MPC · JPL
867062	2015 UA_{87}	—	May 28, 2014	Haleakala	Pan-STARRS 1	MAR	880 m	MPC · JPL
867063	2015 UZ_{88}	—	December 10, 2010	Mount Lemmon	Mount Lemmon Survey	·	2.0 km	MPC · JPL
867064	2015 UF_{89}	—	October 21, 2015	Haleakala	Pan-STARRS 1	·	1.3 km	MPC · JPL
867065	2015 UG_{89}	—	July 28, 2014	Haleakala	Pan-STARRS 1	·	1.9 km	MPC · JPL
867066	2015 UQ_{89}	—	October 23, 2015	Kitt Peak	Spacewatch	(5)	860 m	MPC · JPL
867067	2015 UJ_{90}	—	October 25, 2015	Haleakala	Pan-STARRS 1	·	2.4 km	MPC · JPL
867068	2015 UD_{91}	—	October 22, 2015	Haleakala	Pan-STARRS 1	·	2.2 km	MPC · JPL
867069	2015 UC_{94}	—	October 18, 2015	Haleakala	Pan-STARRS 1	·	1.2 km	MPC · JPL
867070	2015 UO_{94}	—	October 23, 2015	Mount Lemmon	Mount Lemmon Survey	·	2.0 km	MPC · JPL
867071	2015 UZ_{96}	—	August 5, 2011	ESA OGS	ESA OGS	·	730 m	MPC · JPL
867072	2015 UD_{97}	—	October 23, 2015	Mount Lemmon	Mount Lemmon Survey	TEL	910 m	MPC · JPL
867073	2015 UN_{97}	—	October 23, 2015	Mount Lemmon	Mount Lemmon Survey	·	1.1 km	MPC · JPL
867074	2015 US_{97}	—	October 24, 2015	Mount Lemmon	Mount Lemmon Survey	·	1.3 km	MPC · JPL
867075	2015 US_{99}	—	October 16, 2015	Mount Lemmon	Mount Lemmon Survey	·	1.9 km	MPC · JPL
867076	2015 UF_{100}	—	October 21, 2015	Haleakala	Pan-STARRS 1	EOS	1.4 km	MPC · JPL
867077	2015 UU_{100}	—	October 24, 2015	Mount Lemmon	Mount Lemmon Survey	·	1.9 km	MPC · JPL
867078	2015 UV_{100}	—	October 25, 2015	Haleakala	Pan-STARRS 1	·	1.6 km	MPC · JPL
867079	2015 UA_{102}	—	October 18, 2015	Haleakala	Pan-STARRS 1	EOS	1.1 km	MPC · JPL
867080	2015 UP_{102}	—	October 25, 2015	Haleakala	Pan-STARRS 1	·	1.3 km	MPC · JPL
867081	2015 UW_{103}	—	October 18, 2015	Haleakala	Pan-STARRS 1	·	2.7 km	MPC · JPL
867082	2015 UX_{103}	—	October 16, 2015	Kitt Peak	Spacewatch	·	1.7 km	MPC · JPL
867083	2015 UN_{104}	—	October 18, 2015	Haleakala	Pan-STARRS 1	·	490 m	MPC · JPL
867084	2015 UH_{106}	—	September 12, 2015	Haleakala	Pan-STARRS 1	TIR	1.9 km	MPC · JPL
867085	2015 UM_{107}	—	October 23, 2015	Mount Lemmon	Mount Lemmon Survey	EOS	1.3 km	MPC · JPL
867086	2015 UN_{107}	—	October 23, 2015	Mount Lemmon	Mount Lemmon Survey	·	1.6 km	MPC · JPL
867087	2015 UC_{110}	—	October 19, 2015	Haleakala	Pan-STARRS 1	·	520 m	MPC · JPL
867088	2015 VA	—	October 10, 2015	Space Surveillance	Space Surveillance Telescope	·	1.0 km	MPC · JPL
867089	2015 VE_{2}	—	October 24, 2011	Catalina	CSS	·	1.4 km	MPC · JPL
867090	2015 VZ_{3}	—	December 22, 2008	Kitt Peak	Spacewatch	·	950 m	MPC · JPL
867091	2015 VY_{7}	—	October 13, 2015	Haleakala	Pan-STARRS 1	LIX	2.3 km	MPC · JPL
867092	2015 VP_{8}	—	September 12, 2015	Haleakala	Pan-STARRS 1	·	840 m	MPC · JPL
867093	2015 VU_{9}	—	September 23, 2015	Haleakala	Pan-STARRS 1	H	410 m	MPC · JPL
867094	2015 VB_{11}	—	September 18, 2015	Mount Lemmon	Mount Lemmon Survey	·	1.3 km	MPC · JPL
867095	2015 VQ_{11}	—	October 25, 2005	Kitt Peak	Spacewatch	·	450 m	MPC · JPL
867096	2015 VZ_{11}	—	November 1, 2010	Mount Lemmon	Mount Lemmon Survey	·	1.7 km	MPC · JPL
867097	2015 VO_{14}	—	September 18, 2010	Mount Lemmon	Mount Lemmon Survey	·	1.4 km	MPC · JPL
867098	2015 VG_{17}	—	October 26, 2008	Kitt Peak	Spacewatch	·	660 m	MPC · JPL
867099	2015 VH_{17}	—	September 12, 2015	Haleakala	Pan-STARRS 1	·	510 m	MPC · JPL
867100	2015 VF_{23}	—	September 18, 2003	Kitt Peak	Spacewatch	·	780 m	MPC · JPL

== 867101–867200 ==
back to top

Designation			Discovery			Properties		Ref
Permanent	Provisional	Named after	Date	Site	Discoverer(s)	Category	Diam.	Ref
867101	2015 VK_{23}	—	October 17, 2010	Mount Lemmon	Mount Lemmon Survey	EOS	1.2 km	MPC · JPL
867102	2015 VY_{26}	—	November 6, 2005	Kitt Peak	Spacewatch	·	1.5 km	MPC · JPL
867103	2015 VN_{31}	—	September 9, 2015	Haleakala	Pan-STARRS 1	EUN	750 m	MPC · JPL
867104	2015 VQ_{32}	—	October 1, 2006	Kitt Peak	Spacewatch	·	1.1 km	MPC · JPL
867105	2015 VY_{32}	—	September 9, 2015	Haleakala	Pan-STARRS 1	·	1.1 km	MPC · JPL
867106	2015 VT_{33}	—	December 31, 2008	Kitt Peak	Spacewatch	·	800 m	MPC · JPL
867107	2015 VY_{33}	—	August 28, 2005	Kitt Peak	Spacewatch	·	520 m	MPC · JPL
867108	2015 VX_{34}	—	November 1, 2015	Haleakala	Pan-STARRS 1	·	1.2 km	MPC · JPL
867109	2015 VG_{35}	—	October 26, 2008	Kitt Peak	Spacewatch	·	670 m	MPC · JPL
867110	2015 VO_{35}	—	November 1, 2015	Haleakala	Pan-STARRS 1	·	480 m	MPC · JPL
867111	2015 VT_{42}	—	July 28, 2014	Haleakala	Pan-STARRS 1	·	1.2 km	MPC · JPL
867112	2015 VE_{43}	—	July 26, 2015	Haleakala	Pan-STARRS 1	V	450 m	MPC · JPL
867113	2015 VE_{45}	—	October 28, 2010	Mount Lemmon	Mount Lemmon Survey	·	2.4 km	MPC · JPL
867114	2015 VJ_{45}	—	July 24, 2015	Haleakala	Pan-STARRS 1	·	1.8 km	MPC · JPL
867115	2015 VA_{46}	—	July 23, 2015	Haleakala	Pan-STARRS 1	·	1.6 km	MPC · JPL
867116	2015 VM_{48}	—	July 23, 2015	Haleakala	Pan-STARRS 1	·	2.8 km	MPC · JPL
867117	2015 VV_{48}	—	August 29, 2005	Kitt Peak	Spacewatch	·	450 m	MPC · JPL
867118	2015 VK_{50}	—	September 13, 2005	Kitt Peak	Spacewatch	·	490 m	MPC · JPL
867119	2015 VD_{51}	—	June 27, 2013	Mount Lemmon	Mount Lemmon Survey	·	2.7 km	MPC · JPL
867120	2015 VT_{53}	—	October 30, 2010	Kitt Peak	Spacewatch	·	1.2 km	MPC · JPL
867121	2015 VW_{56}	—	October 26, 2011	Haleakala	Pan-STARRS 1	·	900 m	MPC · JPL
867122	2015 VW_{63}	—	December 22, 2008	Mount Lemmon	Mount Lemmon Survey	·	720 m	MPC · JPL
867123	2015 VM_{65}	—	October 21, 2015	Haleakala	Pan-STARRS 1	H	430 m	MPC · JPL
867124	2015 VP_{69}	—	September 9, 2015	Haleakala	Pan-STARRS 1	·	450 m	MPC · JPL
867125	2015 VT_{70}	—	October 10, 2015	Haleakala	Pan-STARRS 1	·	1.9 km	MPC · JPL
867126	2015 VS_{71}	—	November 14, 2010	Mount Lemmon	Mount Lemmon Survey	·	1.2 km	MPC · JPL
867127	2015 VT_{71}	—	August 18, 2009	Kitt Peak	Spacewatch	·	1.9 km	MPC · JPL
867128	2015 VM_{79}	—	October 12, 2015	Haleakala	Pan-STARRS 1	·	1.4 km	MPC · JPL
867129	2015 VY_{79}	—	October 23, 2015	Mount Lemmon	Mount Lemmon Survey	·	1.4 km	MPC · JPL
867130	2015 VJ_{80}	—	November 1, 2010	Kitt Peak	Spacewatch	·	1.4 km	MPC · JPL
867131	2015 VR_{80}	—	October 11, 2015	Mount Lemmon	Mount Lemmon Survey	·	940 m	MPC · JPL
867132	2015 VC_{89}	—	November 6, 2015	Haleakala	Pan-STARRS 1	EOS	1.3 km	MPC · JPL
867133	2015 VZ_{89}	—	November 6, 2015	Haleakala	Pan-STARRS 1	·	1.8 km	MPC · JPL
867134	2015 VU_{90}	—	November 1, 2010	Piszkés-tető	K. Sárneczky, Z. Kuli	EOS	1.1 km	MPC · JPL
867135	2015 VS_{91}	—	November 6, 2015	Haleakala	Pan-STARRS 1	·	1.3 km	MPC · JPL
867136	2015 VV_{91}	—	November 19, 2008	Kitt Peak	Spacewatch	·	680 m	MPC · JPL
867137	2015 VX_{91}	—	September 3, 2008	Kitt Peak	Spacewatch	·	450 m	MPC · JPL
867138	2015 VY_{91}	—	February 14, 2005	Kitt Peak	Spacewatch	·	930 m	MPC · JPL
867139	2015 VD_{93}	—	August 27, 2011	Haleakala	Pan-STARRS 1	MAS	640 m	MPC · JPL
867140	2015 VD_{98}	—	May 8, 2014	Haleakala	Pan-STARRS 1	·	880 m	MPC · JPL
867141	2015 VN_{99}	—	October 8, 2015	Mount Lemmon	Mount Lemmon Survey	·	1.1 km	MPC · JPL
867142	2015 VH_{104}	—	November 3, 2015	Mount Lemmon	Mount Lemmon Survey	·	1.7 km	MPC · JPL
867143	2015 VT_{104}	—	October 10, 2015	Haleakala	Pan-STARRS 1	V	380 m	MPC · JPL
867144	2015 VA_{105}	—	November 10, 2015	Mount Lemmon	Mount Lemmon Survey	H	420 m	MPC · JPL
867145	2015 VH_{106}	—	January 25, 2012	Haleakala	Pan-STARRS 1	·	1.4 km	MPC · JPL
867146	2015 VL_{106}	—	February 2, 2006	Kitt Peak	Spacewatch	·	2.2 km	MPC · JPL
867147	2015 VL_{107}	—	January 11, 2008	Mount Lemmon	Mount Lemmon Survey	·	930 m	MPC · JPL
867148	2015 VG_{108}	—	September 29, 2008	Kitt Peak	Spacewatch	·	460 m	MPC · JPL
867149	2015 VL_{108}	—	September 9, 2015	Haleakala	Pan-STARRS 1	·	440 m	MPC · JPL
867150	2015 VR_{108}	—	February 9, 2013	Haleakala	Pan-STARRS 1	·	790 m	MPC · JPL
867151	2015 VS_{109}	—	October 12, 2015	Baldone	K. Černis, I. Eglītis	·	460 m	MPC · JPL
867152	2015 VV_{111}	—	December 31, 2008	Kitt Peak	Spacewatch	·	720 m	MPC · JPL
867153	2015 VA_{114}	—	December 29, 2011	Mount Lemmon	Mount Lemmon Survey	·	1.1 km	MPC · JPL
867154	2015 VZ_{117}	—	October 10, 2015	Haleakala	Pan-STARRS 1	·	1.5 km	MPC · JPL
867155	2015 VA_{121}	—	November 23, 2011	Kitt Peak	Spacewatch	·	760 m	MPC · JPL
867156	2015 VJ_{123}	—	November 7, 2015	Mount Lemmon	Mount Lemmon Survey	·	3.1 km	MPC · JPL
867157	2015 VQ_{123}	—	September 23, 2015	Haleakala	Pan-STARRS 1	·	2.3 km	MPC · JPL
867158	2015 VH_{124}	—	October 9, 2015	Haleakala	Pan-STARRS 1	·	1.9 km	MPC · JPL
867159	2015 VN_{125}	—	November 2, 2008	Mount Lemmon	Mount Lemmon Survey	·	720 m	MPC · JPL
867160	2015 VA_{127}	—	September 9, 2015	Haleakala	Pan-STARRS 1	·	460 m	MPC · JPL
867161	2015 VC_{130}	—	July 30, 2005	Palomar	NEAT	·	550 m	MPC · JPL
867162	2015 VZ_{130}	—	October 23, 2015	Catalina	CSS	·	890 m	MPC · JPL
867163	2015 VT_{131}	—	December 21, 2008	Kitt Peak	Spacewatch	NYS	960 m	MPC · JPL
867164	2015 VW_{134}	—	January 15, 2005	Catalina	CSS	·	2.8 km	MPC · JPL
867165	2015 VL_{135}	—	September 19, 2015	Haleakala	Pan-STARRS 1	ERI	1.2 km	MPC · JPL
867166	2015 VO_{135}	—	March 11, 2013	Palomar	Palomar Transient Factory	PHO	740 m	MPC · JPL
867167	2015 VP_{136}	—	August 12, 2015	Haleakala	Pan-STARRS 1	·	1.0 km	MPC · JPL
867168	2015 VD_{138}	—	November 4, 2004	Kitt Peak	Spacewatch	·	2.2 km	MPC · JPL
867169	2015 VK_{138}	—	January 3, 2013	Mount Lemmon	Mount Lemmon Survey	·	570 m	MPC · JPL
867170	2015 VX_{138}	—	June 27, 2014	Haleakala	Pan-STARRS 1	·	1.7 km	MPC · JPL
867171	2015 VB_{139}	—	November 10, 2015	Mount Lemmon	Mount Lemmon Survey	·	720 m	MPC · JPL
867172	2015 VE_{142}	—	January 14, 2013	ESA OGS	ESA OGS	·	540 m	MPC · JPL
867173	2015 VH_{145}	—	November 13, 2015	Mount Lemmon	Mount Lemmon Survey	·	1.8 km	MPC · JPL
867174	2015 VD_{147}	—	August 21, 2014	Haleakala	Pan-STARRS 1	·	2.5 km	MPC · JPL
867175	2015 VP_{149}	—	November 5, 2010	Mount Lemmon	Mount Lemmon Survey	·	2.0 km	MPC · JPL
867176	2015 VB_{150}	—	May 10, 2014	Haleakala	Pan-STARRS 1	·	1.3 km	MPC · JPL
867177	2015 VH_{153}	—	November 3, 2015	Haleakala	Pan-STARRS 1	H	440 m	MPC · JPL
867178	2015 VR_{153}	—	November 1, 2015	Kitt Peak	Spacewatch	·	1.5 km	MPC · JPL
867179	2015 VZ_{154}	—	August 12, 1999	Kitt Peak	Spacewatch	·	1.1 km	MPC · JPL
867180	2015 VX_{155}	—	December 1, 2006	Mount Lemmon	Mount Lemmon Survey	(18466)	1.5 km	MPC · JPL
867181	2015 VJ_{156}	—	April 24, 2007	Mount Lemmon	Mount Lemmon Survey	·	1.5 km	MPC · JPL
867182	2015 VV_{157}	—	September 28, 2009	Kitt Peak	Spacewatch	·	1.9 km	MPC · JPL
867183	2015 VC_{158}	—	October 4, 2004	Anderson Mesa	LONEOS	·	1.9 km	MPC · JPL
867184	2015 VJ_{158}	—	September 29, 2010	Mount Lemmon	Mount Lemmon Survey	·	1.5 km	MPC · JPL
867185	2015 VL_{158}	—	November 1, 2015	Kitt Peak	Spacewatch	·	2.0 km	MPC · JPL
867186	2015 VZ_{158}	—	November 2, 2015	Haleakala	Pan-STARRS 1	·	1.7 km	MPC · JPL
867187	2015 VD_{159}	—	November 2, 2015	Haleakala	Pan-STARRS 1	·	2.2 km	MPC · JPL
867188	2015 VE_{159}	—	January 8, 2011	Mount Lemmon	Mount Lemmon Survey	TIR	2.3 km	MPC · JPL
867189	2015 VA_{160}	—	June 27, 2014	Haleakala	Pan-STARRS 1	·	1.3 km	MPC · JPL
867190	2015 VR_{160}	—	May 8, 2013	Haleakala	Pan-STARRS 1	EOS	1.2 km	MPC · JPL
867191	2015 VG_{163}	—	December 14, 2010	Mount Lemmon	Mount Lemmon Survey	·	1.7 km	MPC · JPL
867192	2015 VJ_{163}	—	November 13, 2015	Mount Lemmon	Mount Lemmon Survey	·	1.6 km	MPC · JPL
867193	2015 VN_{163}	—	January 22, 2006	Mount Lemmon	Mount Lemmon Survey	·	1.2 km	MPC · JPL
867194	2015 VU_{163}	—	July 28, 2014	Haleakala	Pan-STARRS 1	EMA	1.8 km	MPC · JPL
867195	2015 VV_{163}	—	October 29, 2010	Mount Lemmon	Mount Lemmon Survey	DOR	1.4 km	MPC · JPL
867196	2015 VG_{174}	—	November 3, 2015	Mount Lemmon	Mount Lemmon Survey	·	1.4 km	MPC · JPL
867197	2015 VM_{174}	—	November 1, 2015	Haleakala	Pan-STARRS 1	·	2.2 km	MPC · JPL
867198	2015 VW_{174}	—	November 12, 2015	Mount Lemmon	Mount Lemmon Survey	EUN	830 m	MPC · JPL
867199	2015 VL_{178}	—	November 6, 2015	ESA OGS	ESA OGS	(5)	790 m	MPC · JPL
867200	2015 VU_{178}	—	November 1, 2015	Mount Lemmon	Mount Lemmon Survey	EUP	2.7 km	MPC · JPL

== 867201–867300 ==
back to top

Designation			Discovery			Properties		Ref
Permanent	Provisional	Named after	Date	Site	Discoverer(s)	Category	Diam.	Ref
867201	2015 VA_{180}	—	November 6, 2015	Mount Lemmon	Mount Lemmon Survey	·	1.1 km	MPC · JPL
867202	2015 VU_{181}	—	November 3, 2015	Mount Lemmon	Mount Lemmon Survey	·	430 m	MPC · JPL
867203	2015 VW_{182}	—	October 1, 2008	Kitt Peak	Spacewatch	·	470 m	MPC · JPL
867204	2015 VF_{183}	—	November 7, 2015	Haleakala	Pan-STARRS 1	·	540 m	MPC · JPL
867205	2015 VP_{184}	—	November 12, 2015	Mount Lemmon	Mount Lemmon Survey	HNS	780 m	MPC · JPL
867206	2015 VA_{186}	—	November 13, 2015	Mount Lemmon	Mount Lemmon Survey	EOS	1.2 km	MPC · JPL
867207	2015 VX_{186}	—	November 12, 2015	Mount Lemmon	Mount Lemmon Survey	·	510 m	MPC · JPL
867208	2015 VB_{187}	—	November 3, 2015	Mount Lemmon	Mount Lemmon Survey	KOR	950 m	MPC · JPL
867209	2015 VX_{187}	—	November 12, 2015	Mount Lemmon	Mount Lemmon Survey	·	2.2 km	MPC · JPL
867210	2015 VC_{190}	—	February 27, 2006	Mount Lemmon	Mount Lemmon Survey	·	790 m	MPC · JPL
867211	2015 VV_{191}	—	November 10, 2015	Mount Lemmon	Mount Lemmon Survey	·	1.4 km	MPC · JPL
867212	2015 VW_{191}	—	November 6, 2015	Haleakala	Pan-STARRS 1	EOS	1.5 km	MPC · JPL
867213	2015 VY_{191}	—	November 6, 2015	Haleakala	Pan-STARRS 1	EOS	1.4 km	MPC · JPL
867214	2015 VZ_{191}	—	November 2, 2015	Haleakala	Pan-STARRS 1	·	1.8 km	MPC · JPL
867215	2015 VB_{192}	—	November 3, 2015	Mount Lemmon	Mount Lemmon Survey	H	270 m	MPC · JPL
867216	2015 VJ_{192}	—	November 12, 2015	Mount Lemmon	Mount Lemmon Survey	·	2.0 km	MPC · JPL
867217	2015 VN_{192}	—	November 7, 2015	Mount Lemmon	Mount Lemmon Survey	·	1.1 km	MPC · JPL
867218	2015 VO_{192}	—	November 14, 2015	Mount Lemmon	Mount Lemmon Survey	EOS	1.4 km	MPC · JPL
867219	2015 VQ_{192}	—	November 8, 2015	Mount Lemmon	Mount Lemmon Survey	EOS	1.2 km	MPC · JPL
867220	2015 VA_{194}	—	November 3, 2015	Mount Lemmon	Mount Lemmon Survey	·	2.1 km	MPC · JPL
867221	2015 VB_{194}	—	November 14, 2015	Mount Lemmon	Mount Lemmon Survey	EOS	1.2 km	MPC · JPL
867222	2015 VQ_{194}	—	November 12, 2015	Mount Lemmon	Mount Lemmon Survey	GEF	880 m	MPC · JPL
867223	2015 VJ_{195}	—	November 7, 2015	Mount Lemmon	Mount Lemmon Survey	THM	1.5 km	MPC · JPL
867224	2015 VN_{195}	—	November 6, 2015	ESA OGS	ESA OGS	·	1.8 km	MPC · JPL
867225	2015 VB_{197}	—	November 7, 2015	Mount Lemmon	Mount Lemmon Survey	·	2.5 km	MPC · JPL
867226	2015 VD_{197}	—	November 7, 2015	Mount Lemmon	Mount Lemmon Survey	·	1.3 km	MPC · JPL
867227	2015 VZ_{197}	—	November 9, 2015	Mount Lemmon	Mount Lemmon Survey	·	1.3 km	MPC · JPL
867228	2015 VD_{198}	—	November 7, 2015	Mount Lemmon	Mount Lemmon Survey	·	1.3 km	MPC · JPL
867229	2015 VH_{198}	—	November 6, 2015	Mount Lemmon	Mount Lemmon Survey	·	1.8 km	MPC · JPL
867230	2015 VW_{198}	—	November 6, 2015	ESA OGS	ESA OGS	·	1.3 km	MPC · JPL
867231	2015 VB_{199}	—	November 6, 2015	Mount Lemmon	Mount Lemmon Survey	TIR	2.1 km	MPC · JPL
867232	2015 VG_{201}	—	November 7, 2015	Mount Lemmon	Mount Lemmon Survey	·	1.2 km	MPC · JPL
867233	2015 VT_{201}	—	November 7, 2015	Mount Lemmon	Mount Lemmon Survey	EOS	1.1 km	MPC · JPL
867234	2015 VZ_{202}	—	November 10, 2015	Mount Lemmon	Mount Lemmon Survey	·	680 m	MPC · JPL
867235	2015 VS_{203}	—	November 7, 2015	Haleakala	Pan-STARRS 1	·	920 m	MPC · JPL
867236	2015 VT_{206}	—	November 14, 2015	Mount Lemmon	Mount Lemmon Survey	·	1.3 km	MPC · JPL
867237	2015 VQ_{209}	—	November 15, 2015	Calar Alto-CASADO	Hellmich, S., Mottola, S.	·	2.4 km	MPC · JPL
867238	2015 VN_{213}	—	November 5, 2005	Kitt Peak	Spacewatch	·	1.2 km	MPC · JPL
867239	2015 VL_{218}	—	November 9, 2015	Mount Lemmon	Mount Lemmon Survey	·	620 m	MPC · JPL
867240	2015 VB_{222}	—	November 6, 2015	Mauna Kea	COIAS	·	1.1 km	MPC · JPL
867241	2015 VO_{227}	—	November 10, 2015	Mauna Kea	COIAS	·	580 m	MPC · JPL
867242	2015 VT_{228}	—	November 6, 2015	Mauna Kea	COIAS	·	1.5 km	MPC · JPL
867243	2015 WS	—	October 12, 2010	Kitt Peak	Spacewatch	·	1.4 km	MPC · JPL
867244	2015 WF_{1}	—	October 14, 2010	Mount Lemmon	Mount Lemmon Survey	·	350 m	MPC · JPL
867245	2015 WD_{11}	—	October 28, 2008	Mount Lemmon	Mount Lemmon Survey	·	330 m	MPC · JPL
867246	2015 WR_{12}	—	August 14, 2014	Haleakala	Pan-STARRS 1	·	2.9 km	MPC · JPL
867247	2015 WK_{16}	—	October 23, 2008	Kitt Peak	Spacewatch	·	1.5 km	MPC · JPL
867248	2015 WU_{16}	—	November 18, 2015	Haleakala	Pan-STARRS 1	H	310 m	MPC · JPL
867249	2015 WD_{17}	—	November 22, 2015	Mount Lemmon	Mount Lemmon Survey	H	410 m	MPC · JPL
867250	2015 WC_{18}	—	November 18, 2015	Haleakala	Pan-STARRS 1	·	940 m	MPC · JPL
867251	2015 WS_{19}	—	July 1, 2014	Haleakala	Pan-STARRS 1	EOS	1.3 km	MPC · JPL
867252	2015 WJ_{20}	—	July 1, 2014	Haleakala	Pan-STARRS 1	EOS	1.3 km	MPC · JPL
867253	2015 WM_{20}	—	July 25, 2014	Haleakala	Pan-STARRS 1	·	1.9 km	MPC · JPL
867254	2015 WN_{20}	—	November 18, 2015	Haleakala	Pan-STARRS 1	EOS	1.3 km	MPC · JPL
867255	2015 WS_{20}	—	July 30, 2014	Haleakala	Pan-STARRS 1	T_{j} (2.92)	3.5 km	MPC · JPL
867256	2015 WT_{20}	—	November 19, 2015	Mount Lemmon	Mount Lemmon Survey	·	1.1 km	MPC · JPL
867257	2015 WE_{21}	—	January 14, 2011	Mount Lemmon	Mount Lemmon Survey	·	1.5 km	MPC · JPL
867258	2015 WM_{21}	—	November 10, 2015	Mount Lemmon	Mount Lemmon Survey	·	1.1 km	MPC · JPL
867259	2015 WO_{21}	—	November 22, 2015	Mount Lemmon	Mount Lemmon Survey	·	1.2 km	MPC · JPL
867260	2015 WQ_{21}	—	December 25, 2010	Mount Lemmon	Mount Lemmon Survey	·	1.3 km	MPC · JPL
867261	2015 WP_{22}	—	November 22, 2015	Mount Lemmon	Mount Lemmon Survey	·	460 m	MPC · JPL
867262	2015 WW_{22}	—	November 20, 2015	Mount Lemmon	Mount Lemmon Survey	·	2.0 km	MPC · JPL
867263	2015 WC_{23}	—	November 21, 2015	Mount Lemmon	Mount Lemmon Survey	·	2.2 km	MPC · JPL
867264	2015 WT_{23}	—	December 26, 2006	Kitt Peak	Spacewatch	·	1.1 km	MPC · JPL
867265	2015 WU_{23}	—	November 22, 2015	Mount Lemmon	Mount Lemmon Survey	·	2.1 km	MPC · JPL
867266	2015 WG_{24}	—	November 22, 2015	Mount Lemmon	Mount Lemmon Survey	·	910 m	MPC · JPL
867267	2015 WS_{26}	—	November 22, 2015	Mount Lemmon	Mount Lemmon Survey	·	1.9 km	MPC · JPL
867268	2015 WZ_{28}	—	November 22, 2015	Mount Lemmon	Mount Lemmon Survey	·	1.6 km	MPC · JPL
867269	2015 WX_{30}	—	November 20, 2015	Mount Lemmon	Mount Lemmon Survey	·	1.7 km	MPC · JPL
867270	2015 WY_{30}	—	November 21, 2015	Mount Lemmon	Mount Lemmon Survey	·	1.2 km	MPC · JPL
867271	2015 WO_{31}	—	November 21, 2015	Mount Lemmon	Mount Lemmon Survey	EOS	1.3 km	MPC · JPL
867272	2015 WD_{32}	—	November 21, 2015	Mount Lemmon	Mount Lemmon Survey	·	1.7 km	MPC · JPL
867273	2015 WG_{32}	—	November 18, 2015	Haleakala	Pan-STARRS 1	H	340 m	MPC · JPL
867274	2015 WR_{32}	—	November 23, 2015	Mount Lemmon	Mount Lemmon Survey	·	1.7 km	MPC · JPL
867275	2015 WW_{32}	—	November 22, 2015	Mount Lemmon	Mount Lemmon Survey	EOS	1.3 km	MPC · JPL
867276	2015 WF_{33}	—	November 22, 2015	Mount Lemmon	Mount Lemmon Survey	·	2.0 km	MPC · JPL
867277	2015 WG_{33}	—	November 22, 2015	Mount Lemmon	Mount Lemmon Survey	·	1.5 km	MPC · JPL
867278	2015 WK_{34}	—	November 17, 2015	Haleakala	Pan-STARRS 1	·	1.0 km	MPC · JPL
867279	2015 WN_{34}	—	November 21, 2015	Mount Lemmon	Mount Lemmon Survey	EOS	1.3 km	MPC · JPL
867280	2015 WF_{35}	—	November 16, 2015	Haleakala	Pan-STARRS 1	H	350 m	MPC · JPL
867281	2015 WH_{35}	—	November 22, 2015	Mount Lemmon	Mount Lemmon Survey	(5651)	2.1 km	MPC · JPL
867282	2015 WX_{35}	—	November 22, 2015	Mount Lemmon	Mount Lemmon Survey	·	620 m	MPC · JPL
867283	2015 WA_{36}	—	November 19, 2015	Mount Lemmon	Mount Lemmon Survey	·	600 m	MPC · JPL
867284	2015 WR_{36}	—	November 18, 2015	Haleakala	Pan-STARRS 1	·	2.0 km	MPC · JPL
867285	2015 WW_{37}	—	November 16, 2015	Haleakala	Pan-STARRS 1	·	1.7 km	MPC · JPL
867286	2015 WX_{39}	—	November 22, 2015	Mount Lemmon	Mount Lemmon Survey	·	560 m	MPC · JPL
867287	2015 WP_{41}	—	November 22, 2015	Mount Lemmon	Mount Lemmon Survey	V	400 m	MPC · JPL
867288	2015 WM_{43}	—	November 21, 2015	Mount Lemmon	Mount Lemmon Survey	·	2.0 km	MPC · JPL
867289	2015 WN_{43}	—	November 17, 2015	Haleakala	Pan-STARRS 1	·	1.6 km	MPC · JPL
867290	2015 WQ_{43}	—	November 21, 2015	Mount Lemmon	Mount Lemmon Survey	·	1.7 km	MPC · JPL
867291	2015 XX	—	April 25, 2007	Mount Lemmon	Mount Lemmon Survey	·	590 m	MPC · JPL
867292	2015 XU_{5}	—	November 17, 2015	Haleakala	Pan-STARRS 1	·	1.4 km	MPC · JPL
867293	2015 XW_{6}	—	November 13, 2015	Kitt Peak	Spacewatch	(2076)	500 m	MPC · JPL
867294	2015 XA_{8}	—	November 12, 2006	Mount Lemmon	Mount Lemmon Survey	EUN	770 m	MPC · JPL
867295	2015 XO_{9}	—	August 19, 2009	Catalina	CSS	·	2.1 km	MPC · JPL
867296	2015 XY_{9}	—	January 14, 2012	Mount Lemmon	Mount Lemmon Survey	JUN	650 m	MPC · JPL
867297	2015 XE_{10}	—	November 13, 2015	Kitt Peak	Spacewatch	·	740 m	MPC · JPL
867298	2015 XK_{11}	—	July 19, 2015	Haleakala	Pan-STARRS 1	BRA	1.2 km	MPC · JPL
867299	2015 XX_{11}	—	July 19, 2015	Haleakala	Pan-STARRS 1	·	810 m	MPC · JPL
867300	2015 XY_{12}	—	November 19, 2006	Kitt Peak	Spacewatch	·	1.1 km	MPC · JPL

== 867301–867400 ==
back to top

Designation			Discovery			Properties		Ref
Permanent	Provisional	Named after	Date	Site	Discoverer(s)	Category	Diam.	Ref
867301	2015 XN_{14}	—	October 9, 2015	Haleakala	Pan-STARRS 1	EOS	1.1 km	MPC · JPL
867302	2015 XG_{16}	—	October 28, 2008	Mount Lemmon	Mount Lemmon Survey	·	500 m	MPC · JPL
867303	2015 XS_{19}	—	March 28, 2012	Mount Lemmon	Mount Lemmon Survey	EOS	1.3 km	MPC · JPL
867304	2015 XW_{19}	—	March 29, 2012	Haleakala	Pan-STARRS 1	·	1.9 km	MPC · JPL
867305	2015 XD_{21}	—	September 23, 2008	Mount Lemmon	Mount Lemmon Survey	·	480 m	MPC · JPL
867306	2015 XF_{22}	—	November 18, 2015	Haleakala	Pan-STARRS 1	·	1.2 km	MPC · JPL
867307	2015 XB_{23}	—	July 26, 2011	Haleakala	Pan-STARRS 1	·	520 m	MPC · JPL
867308	2015 XC_{23}	—	November 12, 2010	Mount Lemmon	Mount Lemmon Survey	·	1.4 km	MPC · JPL
867309	2015 XE_{25}	—	January 19, 2012	Haleakala	Pan-STARRS 1	·	1.3 km	MPC · JPL
867310	2015 XN_{25}	—	October 1, 2008	Kitt Peak	Spacewatch	·	570 m	MPC · JPL
867311	2015 XA_{26}	—	October 26, 2011	Haleakala	Pan-STARRS 1	·	820 m	MPC · JPL
867312	2015 XH_{28}	—	December 2, 2015	Haleakala	Pan-STARRS 1	·	2.2 km	MPC · JPL
867313	2015 XZ_{30}	—	December 2, 2015	Haleakala	Pan-STARRS 1	·	2.2 km	MPC · JPL
867314	2015 XD_{31}	—	December 2, 2015	Haleakala	Pan-STARRS 1	EUN	620 m	MPC · JPL
867315	2015 XA_{32}	—	April 5, 2014	Haleakala	Pan-STARRS 1	·	680 m	MPC · JPL
867316	2015 XC_{33}	—	October 9, 2015	Haleakala	Pan-STARRS 1	·	1.6 km	MPC · JPL
867317	2015 XD_{37}	—	November 13, 2015	Mount Lemmon	Mount Lemmon Survey	·	1.4 km	MPC · JPL
867318	2015 XR_{37}	—	September 11, 2004	Kitt Peak	Spacewatch	·	1.3 km	MPC · JPL
867319	2015 XC_{42}	—	February 3, 2006	Mauna Kea	P. A. Wiegert, R. Rasmussen	·	1.5 km	MPC · JPL
867320	2015 XE_{42}	—	June 4, 2011	Mount Lemmon	Mount Lemmon Survey	·	440 m	MPC · JPL
867321	2015 XA_{43}	—	March 5, 2008	Mount Lemmon	Mount Lemmon Survey	PAD	1.1 km	MPC · JPL
867322	2015 XG_{43}	—	November 18, 2015	Haleakala	Pan-STARRS 1	·	2.1 km	MPC · JPL
867323	2015 XN_{43}	—	October 8, 2015	Haleakala	Pan-STARRS 1	·	1.6 km	MPC · JPL
867324	2015 XV_{43}	—	September 1, 2014	Mount Lemmon	Mount Lemmon Survey	·	2.3 km	MPC · JPL
867325	2015 XG_{44}	—	October 23, 2006	Mount Lemmon	Mount Lemmon Survey	GEF	770 m	MPC · JPL
867326	2015 XM_{45}	—	December 2, 2015	Haleakala	Pan-STARRS 1	·	1.3 km	MPC · JPL
867327	2015 XZ_{45}	—	November 7, 2015	Haleakala	Pan-STARRS 1	·	1.2 km	MPC · JPL
867328	2015 XY_{47}	—	May 4, 2014	Haleakala	Pan-STARRS 1	·	1.1 km	MPC · JPL
867329	2015 XZ_{47}	—	December 2, 2015	Haleakala	Pan-STARRS 1	·	1.7 km	MPC · JPL
867330	2015 XH_{49}	—	December 2, 2015	Haleakala	Pan-STARRS 1	·	1.4 km	MPC · JPL
867331	2015 XC_{50}	—	May 6, 2014	Mount Lemmon	Mount Lemmon Survey	·	1.4 km	MPC · JPL
867332	2015 XW_{50}	—	December 8, 2010	Mount Lemmon	Mount Lemmon Survey	·	1.7 km	MPC · JPL
867333	2015 XQ_{51}	—	November 9, 2015	Mount Lemmon	Mount Lemmon Survey	·	2.0 km	MPC · JPL
867334	2015 XT_{51}	—	October 21, 2015	Haleakala	Pan-STARRS 1	·	810 m	MPC · JPL
867335	2015 XU_{51}	—	October 9, 2015	Haleakala	Pan-STARRS 1	·	1.6 km	MPC · JPL
867336	2015 XZ_{55}	—	November 7, 2015	Mount Lemmon	Mount Lemmon Survey	·	2.5 km	MPC · JPL
867337	2015 XL_{56}	—	October 11, 2004	Kitt Peak	Spacewatch	EOS	1.2 km	MPC · JPL
867338	2015 XP_{56}	—	December 1, 2015	Haleakala	Pan-STARRS 1	·	2.1 km	MPC · JPL
867339	2015 XH_{57}	—	August 20, 2014	Haleakala	Pan-STARRS 1	·	1.5 km	MPC · JPL
867340	2015 XR_{57}	—	March 16, 2012	Kitt Peak	Spacewatch	·	1.7 km	MPC · JPL
867341	2015 XZ_{57}	—	November 10, 2015	Mount Lemmon	Mount Lemmon Survey	·	1.8 km	MPC · JPL
867342	2015 XX_{62}	—	July 31, 2014	Haleakala	Pan-STARRS 1	·	1.5 km	MPC · JPL
867343	2015 XA_{64}	—	December 1, 2015	Haleakala	Pan-STARRS 1	·	1.4 km	MPC · JPL
867344	2015 XK_{65}	—	December 1, 2015	Haleakala	Pan-STARRS 1	·	1.5 km	MPC · JPL
867345	2015 XG_{67}	—	May 7, 2008	Kitt Peak	Spacewatch	·	1.6 km	MPC · JPL
867346	2015 XL_{70}	—	November 5, 2010	Mount Lemmon	Mount Lemmon Survey	·	1.3 km	MPC · JPL
867347	2015 XM_{70}	—	November 11, 2004	Kitt Peak	Spacewatch	·	830 m	MPC · JPL
867348	2015 XE_{71}	—	November 1, 2015	Haleakala	Pan-STARRS 1	(883)	490 m	MPC · JPL
867349	2015 XW_{73}	—	October 9, 2015	Haleakala	Pan-STARRS 1	·	1.5 km	MPC · JPL
867350	2015 XR_{75}	—	September 23, 2015	Haleakala	Pan-STARRS 1	·	960 m	MPC · JPL
867351	2015 XS_{75}	—	November 17, 2008	Kitt Peak	Spacewatch	·	470 m	MPC · JPL
867352	2015 XB_{76}	—	November 22, 2015	Mount Lemmon	Mount Lemmon Survey	·	1.3 km	MPC · JPL
867353	2015 XC_{76}	—	January 13, 2011	Mount Lemmon	Mount Lemmon Survey	·	1.1 km	MPC · JPL
867354	2015 XJ_{76}	—	June 27, 2014	Haleakala	Pan-STARRS 1	EOS	1.3 km	MPC · JPL
867355	2015 XB_{77}	—	December 3, 2015	Haleakala	Pan-STARRS 1	·	1.2 km	MPC · JPL
867356	2015 XJ_{77}	—	December 3, 2015	Haleakala	Pan-STARRS 1	·	1.7 km	MPC · JPL
867357	2015 XW_{77}	—	July 28, 2014	Haleakala	Pan-STARRS 1	·	2.2 km	MPC · JPL
867358	2015 XJ_{78}	—	February 13, 2011	Kitt Peak	Spacewatch	·	1.8 km	MPC · JPL
867359	2015 XB_{80}	—	August 3, 2014	Haleakala	Pan-STARRS 1	·	1.9 km	MPC · JPL
867360	2015 XK_{82}	—	September 19, 2015	Haleakala	Pan-STARRS 1	·	1.1 km	MPC · JPL
867361	2015 XT_{82}	—	December 3, 2015	Haleakala	Pan-STARRS 1	·	1.7 km	MPC · JPL
867362	2015 XW_{82}	—	December 3, 2015	Haleakala	Pan-STARRS 1	·	2.1 km	MPC · JPL
867363	2015 XU_{83}	—	September 17, 2009	Mount Lemmon	Mount Lemmon Survey	·	1.7 km	MPC · JPL
867364	2015 XX_{83}	—	September 14, 1998	Kitt Peak	Spacewatch	·	810 m	MPC · JPL
867365	2015 XQ_{86}	—	December 3, 2015	Haleakala	Pan-STARRS 1	·	1.7 km	MPC · JPL
867366	2015 XA_{88}	—	October 23, 2009	Mount Lemmon	Mount Lemmon Survey	·	2.3 km	MPC · JPL
867367	2015 XQ_{88}	—	October 5, 2015	Haleakala	Pan-STARRS 1	·	2.6 km	MPC · JPL
867368	2015 XR_{90}	—	November 22, 2015	Mount Lemmon	Mount Lemmon Survey	·	530 m	MPC · JPL
867369	2015 XY_{91}	—	January 10, 2013	Haleakala	Pan-STARRS 1	·	490 m	MPC · JPL
867370	2015 XO_{92}	—	September 23, 2015	Haleakala	Pan-STARRS 1	·	1.4 km	MPC · JPL
867371	2015 XC_{93}	—	November 13, 2015	Mount Lemmon	Mount Lemmon Survey	·	1.9 km	MPC · JPL
867372	2015 XQ_{93}	—	September 12, 2001	Kitt Peak	Spacewatch	·	1.1 km	MPC · JPL
867373	2015 XL_{94}	—	December 4, 2015	Haleakala	Pan-STARRS 1	·	2.0 km	MPC · JPL
867374	2015 XV_{95}	—	September 17, 2014	Haleakala	Pan-STARRS 1	·	2.1 km	MPC · JPL
867375	2015 XC_{96}	—	August 20, 2014	Haleakala	Pan-STARRS 1	·	1.6 km	MPC · JPL
867376	2015 XB_{100}	—	September 13, 2007	Mount Lemmon	Mount Lemmon Survey	·	800 m	MPC · JPL
867377	2015 XP_{100}	—	July 25, 2014	Haleakala	Pan-STARRS 1	·	1.2 km	MPC · JPL
867378	2015 XZ_{102}	—	December 4, 2015	Haleakala	Pan-STARRS 1	·	790 m	MPC · JPL
867379	2015 XO_{103}	—	December 4, 2015	Haleakala	Pan-STARRS 1	·	1.5 km	MPC · JPL
867380	2015 XC_{104}	—	September 16, 2009	Kitt Peak	Spacewatch	·	1.7 km	MPC · JPL
867381	2015 XG_{105}	—	September 15, 2009	Kitt Peak	Spacewatch	·	1.6 km	MPC · JPL
867382	2015 XS_{106}	—	November 2, 2008	Mount Lemmon	Mount Lemmon Survey	·	520 m	MPC · JPL
867383	2015 XN_{107}	—	December 4, 2015	Haleakala	Pan-STARRS 1	PHO	550 m	MPC · JPL
867384	2015 XJ_{108}	—	December 4, 2015	Haleakala	Pan-STARRS 1	·	1.4 km	MPC · JPL
867385	2015 XT_{111}	—	March 15, 2013	Mount Lemmon	Mount Lemmon Survey	·	640 m	MPC · JPL
867386	2015 XR_{112}	—	January 28, 2011	Mount Lemmon	Mount Lemmon Survey	VER	2.2 km	MPC · JPL
867387	2015 XW_{112}	—	November 9, 2015	Mount Lemmon	Mount Lemmon Survey	·	1.9 km	MPC · JPL
867388	2015 XC_{116}	—	March 5, 2013	Mount Lemmon	Mount Lemmon Survey	·	690 m	MPC · JPL
867389	2015 XH_{116}	—	December 4, 2015	Haleakala	Pan-STARRS 1	·	2.0 km	MPC · JPL
867390	2015 XL_{116}	—	January 29, 2011	Mayhill-ISON	L. Elenin	·	2.4 km	MPC · JPL
867391	2015 XU_{116}	—	September 14, 2014	Mount Lemmon	Mount Lemmon Survey	·	2.2 km	MPC · JPL
867392	2015 XK_{117}	—	December 4, 2015	Haleakala	Pan-STARRS 1	·	1.5 km	MPC · JPL
867393	2015 XX_{117}	—	May 16, 2012	Haleakala	Pan-STARRS 1	·	2.6 km	MPC · JPL
867394	2015 XJ_{118}	—	June 29, 2014	Mount Lemmon	Mount Lemmon Survey	·	1.2 km	MPC · JPL
867395	2015 XV_{119}	—	December 4, 2015	Haleakala	Pan-STARRS 1	·	1.4 km	MPC · JPL
867396	2015 XA_{120}	—	December 4, 2015	Haleakala	Pan-STARRS 1	·	2.2 km	MPC · JPL
867397	2015 XF_{121}	—	January 7, 2006	Mount Lemmon	Mount Lemmon Survey	·	1.4 km	MPC · JPL
867398	2015 XT_{121}	—	January 30, 2011	Mount Lemmon	Mount Lemmon Survey	·	1.8 km	MPC · JPL
867399	2015 XW_{123}	—	September 16, 2009	Mount Lemmon	Mount Lemmon Survey	·	2.2 km	MPC · JPL
867400	2015 XP_{126}	—	January 31, 2009	Mount Lemmon	Mount Lemmon Survey	PHO	650 m	MPC · JPL

== 867401–867500 ==
back to top

Designation			Discovery			Properties		Ref
Permanent	Provisional	Named after	Date	Site	Discoverer(s)	Category	Diam.	Ref
867401	2015 XQ_{131}	—	March 13, 2013	Kitt Peak	Spacewatch	·	720 m	MPC · JPL
867402	2015 XP_{134}	—	January 4, 2011	Mount Lemmon	Mount Lemmon Survey	·	1.8 km	MPC · JPL
867403	2015 XA_{135}	—	November 30, 2015	Heaven on Earth Ob	W. K. Y. Yeung	·	1.2 km	MPC · JPL
867404	2015 XC_{135}	—	September 23, 2015	Haleakala	Pan-STARRS 1	·	1.4 km	MPC · JPL
867405	2015 XM_{135}	—	December 4, 2015	Mount Lemmon	Mount Lemmon Survey	·	1.7 km	MPC · JPL
867406	2015 XS_{138}	—	July 30, 2014	Haleakala	Pan-STARRS 1	VER	1.9 km	MPC · JPL
867407	2015 XQ_{139}	—	November 22, 2015	Mount Lemmon	Mount Lemmon Survey	·	920 m	MPC · JPL
867408	2015 XT_{140}	—	November 6, 2008	Mount Lemmon	Mount Lemmon Survey	·	500 m	MPC · JPL
867409	2015 XZ_{142}	—	November 22, 2015	Mount Lemmon	Mount Lemmon Survey	·	730 m	MPC · JPL
867410	2015 XS_{143}	—	December 4, 2015	Mount Lemmon	Mount Lemmon Survey	·	1.7 km	MPC · JPL
867411	2015 XB_{147}	—	December 10, 2010	Mount Lemmon	Mount Lemmon Survey	·	1.8 km	MPC · JPL
867412	2015 XJ_{147}	—	August 25, 2014	Haleakala	Pan-STARRS 1	·	2.1 km	MPC · JPL
867413	2015 XD_{149}	—	October 10, 2015	Haleakala	Pan-STARRS 1	·	860 m	MPC · JPL
867414	2015 XR_{149}	—	June 21, 2014	Mount Lemmon	Mount Lemmon Survey	·	2.5 km	MPC · JPL
867415	2015 XY_{149}	—	October 10, 2015	Haleakala	Pan-STARRS 1	·	1.0 km	MPC · JPL
867416	2015 XO_{153}	—	December 4, 2015	Haleakala	Pan-STARRS 1	·	790 m	MPC · JPL
867417	2015 XG_{157}	—	December 5, 2015	Haleakala	Pan-STARRS 1	EUN	960 m	MPC · JPL
867418	2015 XE_{161}	—	November 9, 2015	Mount Lemmon	Mount Lemmon Survey	EOS	1.4 km	MPC · JPL
867419	2015 XF_{161}	—	November 9, 2015	Mount Lemmon	Mount Lemmon Survey	·	2.1 km	MPC · JPL
867420	2015 XZ_{165}	—	December 5, 2015	Haleakala	Pan-STARRS 1	·	1.9 km	MPC · JPL
867421	2015 XH_{166}	—	October 9, 2004	Kitt Peak	Spacewatch	·	760 m	MPC · JPL
867422	2015 XR_{166}	—	December 5, 2015	Haleakala	Pan-STARRS 1	·	870 m	MPC · JPL
867423	2015 XF_{170}	—	July 4, 2014	Haleakala	Pan-STARRS 1	·	1.3 km	MPC · JPL
867424	2015 XG_{174}	—	December 1, 2015	Haleakala	Pan-STARRS 1	·	1.6 km	MPC · JPL
867425	2015 XF_{175}	—	January 3, 2011	Mount Lemmon	Mount Lemmon Survey	·	1.5 km	MPC · JPL
867426	2015 XX_{175}	—	July 25, 2014	Haleakala	Pan-STARRS 1	EOS	1.5 km	MPC · JPL
867427	2015 XN_{177}	—	July 29, 2014	Haleakala	Pan-STARRS 1	·	1.0 km	MPC · JPL
867428	2015 XK_{178}	—	December 5, 2015	Haleakala	Pan-STARRS 1	·	550 m	MPC · JPL
867429	2015 XT_{179}	—	December 5, 2015	Haleakala	Pan-STARRS 1	·	2.1 km	MPC · JPL
867430	2015 XG_{181}	—	December 5, 2015	Haleakala	Pan-STARRS 1	·	1.6 km	MPC · JPL
867431	2015 XD_{182}	—	January 16, 2011	Mount Lemmon	Mount Lemmon Survey	·	2.1 km	MPC · JPL
867432	2015 XA_{183}	—	August 20, 2014	Haleakala	Pan-STARRS 1	·	1.4 km	MPC · JPL
867433	2015 XF_{183}	—	June 27, 2014	Haleakala	Pan-STARRS 1	·	1.5 km	MPC · JPL
867434	2015 XM_{184}	—	December 5, 2015	Haleakala	Pan-STARRS 1	·	2.1 km	MPC · JPL
867435	2015 XT_{185}	—	December 4, 2015	Haleakala	Pan-STARRS 1	·	1.3 km	MPC · JPL
867436	2015 XD_{186}	—	July 28, 2011	Haleakala	Pan-STARRS 1	·	520 m	MPC · JPL
867437	2015 XG_{186}	—	February 16, 2013	Mount Lemmon	Mount Lemmon Survey	·	520 m	MPC · JPL
867438	2015 XX_{187}	—	December 1, 2015	Haleakala	Pan-STARRS 1	·	1.5 km	MPC · JPL
867439	2015 XR_{188}	—	September 19, 2015	Haleakala	Pan-STARRS 1	·	1.8 km	MPC · JPL
867440	2015 XU_{190}	—	May 8, 2014	Haleakala	Pan-STARRS 1	·	760 m	MPC · JPL
867441	2015 XU_{194}	—	December 6, 2015	Mount Lemmon	Mount Lemmon Survey	EOS	1.2 km	MPC · JPL
867442	2015 XK_{196}	—	September 17, 2009	Catalina	CSS	·	1.9 km	MPC · JPL
867443	2015 XG_{198}	—	December 6, 2015	Mount Lemmon	Mount Lemmon Survey	·	840 m	MPC · JPL
867444	2015 XT_{199}	—	December 6, 2015	Haleakala	Pan-STARRS 1	·	2.0 km	MPC · JPL
867445	2015 XC_{200}	—	November 22, 2015	Mount Lemmon	Mount Lemmon Survey	·	440 m	MPC · JPL
867446	2015 XM_{202}	—	July 8, 2014	Haleakala	Pan-STARRS 1	·	1.5 km	MPC · JPL
867447	2015 XG_{205}	—	December 4, 2015	Mount Lemmon	Mount Lemmon Survey	EOS	1.2 km	MPC · JPL
867448	2015 XC_{207}	—	July 31, 2014	Haleakala	Pan-STARRS 1	·	1.7 km	MPC · JPL
867449	2015 XC_{208}	—	September 2, 2014	Haleakala	Pan-STARRS 1	·	1.8 km	MPC · JPL
867450	2015 XH_{216}	—	December 3, 2015	Mount Lemmon	Mount Lemmon Survey	V	460 m	MPC · JPL
867451	2015 XK_{216}	—	November 22, 2015	Mount Lemmon	Mount Lemmon Survey	·	1.0 km	MPC · JPL
867452	2015 XV_{217}	—	May 10, 2014	Haleakala	Pan-STARRS 1	·	580 m	MPC · JPL
867453	2015 XY_{218}	—	December 4, 2015	Mount Lemmon	Mount Lemmon Survey	EOS	1.2 km	MPC · JPL
867454	2015 XG_{219}	—	July 26, 2014	Haleakala	Pan-STARRS 1	·	1.3 km	MPC · JPL
867455	2015 XO_{222}	—	December 3, 2015	Mount Lemmon	Mount Lemmon Survey	·	710 m	MPC · JPL
867456	2015 XE_{229}	—	December 6, 2015	Haleakala	Pan-STARRS 1	·	1.7 km	MPC · JPL
867457	2015 XA_{230}	—	August 20, 2014	Haleakala	Pan-STARRS 1	·	1.2 km	MPC · JPL
867458	2015 XM_{232}	—	December 6, 2015	Haleakala	Pan-STARRS 1	·	2.2 km	MPC · JPL
867459	2015 XX_{232}	—	December 6, 2015	Haleakala	Pan-STARRS 1	·	1.6 km	MPC · JPL
867460	2015 XN_{239}	—	May 8, 2014	Haleakala	Pan-STARRS 1	(5)	880 m	MPC · JPL
867461	2015 XX_{239}	—	June 4, 2014	Haleakala	Pan-STARRS 1	EUN	780 m	MPC · JPL
867462	2015 XD_{245}	—	December 6, 2015	Haleakala	Pan-STARRS 1	·	2.1 km	MPC · JPL
867463	2015 XS_{245}	—	November 17, 2009	Kitt Peak	Spacewatch	·	2.5 km	MPC · JPL
867464	2015 XL_{246}	—	September 23, 2015	Haleakala	Pan-STARRS 1	·	480 m	MPC · JPL
867465	2015 XJ_{247}	—	September 12, 2015	Haleakala	Pan-STARRS 1	·	550 m	MPC · JPL
867466	2015 XR_{248}	—	March 5, 2006	Kitt Peak	Spacewatch	TIR	1.5 km	MPC · JPL
867467	2015 XE_{250}	—	October 10, 2015	Haleakala	Pan-STARRS 1	·	2.1 km	MPC · JPL
867468	2015 XQ_{250}	—	October 21, 2015	Haleakala	Pan-STARRS 1	·	1.5 km	MPC · JPL
867469	2015 XV_{254}	—	July 25, 2014	Haleakala	Pan-STARRS 1	·	2.0 km	MPC · JPL
867470	2015 XC_{256}	—	December 7, 2015	Haleakala	Pan-STARRS 1	·	1.8 km	MPC · JPL
867471	2015 XH_{258}	—	December 7, 2015	Haleakala	Pan-STARRS 1	·	1.7 km	MPC · JPL
867472	2015 XJ_{260}	—	December 8, 2015	Haleakala	Pan-STARRS 1	·	2.0 km	MPC · JPL
867473	2015 XZ_{260}	—	October 21, 2015	Haleakala	Pan-STARRS 1	H	370 m	MPC · JPL
867474	2015 XH_{263}	—	December 4, 2015	Mount Lemmon	Mount Lemmon Survey	·	980 m	MPC · JPL
867475	2015 XM_{263}	—	November 17, 2015	Cerro Paranal	Gaia Ground Based Optical Tracking	EOS	1.0 km	MPC · JPL
867476	2015 XE_{265}	—	November 12, 2015	Mount Lemmon	Mount Lemmon Survey	·	460 m	MPC · JPL
867477	2015 XW_{266}	—	November 22, 2015	Mount Lemmon	Mount Lemmon Survey	AGN	760 m	MPC · JPL
867478	2015 XD_{267}	—	August 27, 2011	Haleakala	Pan-STARRS 1	·	550 m	MPC · JPL
867479	2015 XP_{267}	—	August 30, 2014	Mount Lemmon	Mount Lemmon Survey	·	2.1 km	MPC · JPL
867480	2015 XS_{267}	—	January 8, 2011	Mount Lemmon	Mount Lemmon Survey	·	1.8 km	MPC · JPL
867481	2015 XH_{268}	—	July 30, 2014	Haleakala	Pan-STARRS 1	·	1.6 km	MPC · JPL
867482	2015 XM_{268}	—	July 1, 2014	Haleakala	Pan-STARRS 1	·	1.5 km	MPC · JPL
867483	2015 XR_{270}	—	December 2, 2005	Kitt Peak	L. H. Wasserman, R. L. Millis	THM	1.4 km	MPC · JPL
867484	2015 XB_{271}	—	November 4, 2007	Kitt Peak	Spacewatch	3:2 · SHU	3.7 km	MPC · JPL
867485	2015 XU_{277}	—	November 22, 2015	Mount Lemmon	Mount Lemmon Survey	·	1.3 km	MPC · JPL
867486	2015 XR_{279}	—	September 2, 2011	Haleakala	Pan-STARRS 1	·	720 m	MPC · JPL
867487	2015 XT_{279}	—	December 14, 2006	Kitt Peak	Spacewatch	·	1.2 km	MPC · JPL
867488	2015 XW_{279}	—	December 4, 2015	Mount Lemmon	Mount Lemmon Survey	·	1.6 km	MPC · JPL
867489	2015 XA_{280}	—	September 30, 2009	Mount Lemmon	Mount Lemmon Survey	TIR	2.0 km	MPC · JPL
867490	2015 XK_{280}	—	July 1, 2014	Haleakala	Pan-STARRS 1	·	1.9 km	MPC · JPL
867491	2015 XV_{283}	—	August 7, 2008	Kitt Peak	Spacewatch	·	410 m	MPC · JPL
867492	2015 XV_{284}	—	December 7, 2015	Haleakala	Pan-STARRS 1	·	2.3 km	MPC · JPL
867493	2015 XP_{285}	—	November 19, 2015	Kitt Peak	Spacewatch	·	1.3 km	MPC · JPL
867494	2015 XY_{285}	—	December 7, 2015	Haleakala	Pan-STARRS 1	·	530 m	MPC · JPL
867495	2015 XP_{286}	—	December 3, 2015	Mount Lemmon	Mount Lemmon Survey	NYS	590 m	MPC · JPL
867496	2015 XB_{287}	—	October 11, 2015	Mount Lemmon	Mount Lemmon Survey	·	1.9 km	MPC · JPL
867497	2015 XV_{291}	—	October 22, 2006	Kitt Peak	Spacewatch	·	1.0 km	MPC · JPL
867498	2015 XT_{294}	—	December 7, 2015	Haleakala	Pan-STARRS 1	·	500 m	MPC · JPL
867499	2015 XU_{294}	—	November 2, 2010	Mount Lemmon	Mount Lemmon Survey	·	1.4 km	MPC · JPL
867500	2015 XE_{295}	—	December 4, 2015	Mount Lemmon	Mount Lemmon Survey	·	1.5 km	MPC · JPL

== 867501–867600 ==
back to top

Designation			Discovery			Properties		Ref
Permanent	Provisional	Named after	Date	Site	Discoverer(s)	Category	Diam.	Ref
867501	2015 XS_{296}	—	November 22, 2015	Mount Lemmon	Mount Lemmon Survey	·	480 m	MPC · JPL
867502	2015 XX_{296}	—	July 1, 2014	Haleakala	Pan-STARRS 1	·	1.6 km	MPC · JPL
867503	2015 XC_{298}	—	November 22, 2015	Mount Lemmon	Mount Lemmon Survey	·	1.4 km	MPC · JPL
867504	2015 XF_{298}	—	July 3, 2014	Haleakala	Pan-STARRS 1	·	1.4 km	MPC · JPL
867505	2015 XG_{302}	—	December 7, 2015	Haleakala	Pan-STARRS 1	·	410 m	MPC · JPL
867506	2015 XC_{303}	—	December 26, 2005	Kitt Peak	Spacewatch	·	1.2 km	MPC · JPL
867507	2015 XT_{305}	—	May 8, 2013	Haleakala	Pan-STARRS 1	·	1.9 km	MPC · JPL
867508	2015 XR_{306}	—	December 7, 2015	Haleakala	Pan-STARRS 1	·	970 m	MPC · JPL
867509	2015 XE_{309}	—	November 25, 2006	Kitt Peak	Spacewatch	AEO	800 m	MPC · JPL
867510	2015 XZ_{312}	—	May 24, 2014	Haleakala	Pan-STARRS 1	·	1.0 km	MPC · JPL
867511	2015 XK_{313}	—	December 25, 2005	Kitt Peak	Spacewatch	·	1.2 km	MPC · JPL
867512	2015 XL_{315}	—	July 1, 2014	Haleakala	Pan-STARRS 1	·	1.4 km	MPC · JPL
867513	2015 XS_{317}	—	July 25, 2014	Haleakala	Pan-STARRS 1	·	1.2 km	MPC · JPL
867514	2015 XZ_{318}	—	December 8, 2015	Haleakala	Pan-STARRS 1	·	530 m	MPC · JPL
867515	2015 XU_{321}	—	October 27, 2005	Kitt Peak	Spacewatch	KOR	1.1 km	MPC · JPL
867516	2015 XD_{323}	—	January 14, 2011	Mount Lemmon	Mount Lemmon Survey	·	2.0 km	MPC · JPL
867517	2015 XT_{323}	—	February 3, 2009	Kitt Peak	Spacewatch	NYS	870 m	MPC · JPL
867518	2015 XF_{325}	—	December 8, 2015	Mount Lemmon	Mount Lemmon Survey	·	1.4 km	MPC · JPL
867519	2015 XT_{325}	—	December 8, 2015	Mount Lemmon	Mount Lemmon Survey	·	1.5 km	MPC · JPL
867520	2015 XR_{326}	—	December 8, 2015	Haleakala	Pan-STARRS 1	·	410 m	MPC · JPL
867521	2015 XJ_{327}	—	December 8, 2015	Haleakala	Pan-STARRS 1	·	530 m	MPC · JPL
867522	2015 XQ_{327}	—	August 22, 2014	Haleakala	Pan-STARRS 1	VER	1.8 km	MPC · JPL
867523	2015 XD_{328}	—	December 8, 2015	Haleakala	Pan-STARRS 1	·	1.1 km	MPC · JPL
867524	2015 XG_{328}	—	December 8, 2015	Haleakala	Pan-STARRS 1	·	2.1 km	MPC · JPL
867525	2015 XJ_{329}	—	December 8, 2015	Mount Lemmon	Mount Lemmon Survey	·	1.9 km	MPC · JPL
867526	2015 XE_{331}	—	December 8, 2015	Haleakala	Pan-STARRS 1	·	820 m	MPC · JPL
867527	2015 XZ_{331}	—	February 11, 2011	Mount Lemmon	Mount Lemmon Survey	·	1.9 km	MPC · JPL
867528	2015 XC_{333}	—	December 8, 2015	Haleakala	Pan-STARRS 1	·	940 m	MPC · JPL
867529	2015 XJ_{333}	—	February 5, 2013	Kitt Peak	Spacewatch	·	870 m	MPC · JPL
867530	2015 XE_{336}	—	December 8, 2015	Haleakala	Pan-STARRS 1	·	1.9 km	MPC · JPL
867531	2015 XQ_{338}	—	September 16, 2009	Kitt Peak	Spacewatch	·	1.5 km	MPC · JPL
867532	2015 XG_{345}	—	November 19, 2008	Mount Lemmon	Mount Lemmon Survey	·	510 m	MPC · JPL
867533	2015 XW_{345}	—	December 8, 2015	Haleakala	Pan-STARRS 1	·	570 m	MPC · JPL
867534	2015 XQ_{346}	—	December 8, 2015	Haleakala	Pan-STARRS 1	·	750 m	MPC · JPL
867535	2015 XL_{348}	—	October 25, 2008	Kitt Peak	Spacewatch	·	620 m	MPC · JPL
867536	2015 XU_{350}	—	September 13, 2007	Mount Lemmon	Mount Lemmon Survey	·	850 m	MPC · JPL
867537	2015 XQ_{355}	—	July 1, 2014	Haleakala	Pan-STARRS 1	EOS	1.4 km	MPC · JPL
867538	2015 XD_{356}	—	October 31, 2008	Mount Lemmon	Mount Lemmon Survey	PHO	900 m	MPC · JPL
867539	2015 XP_{356}	—	March 3, 2006	Kitt Peak	Spacewatch	·	2.2 km	MPC · JPL
867540	2015 XF_{359}	—	August 3, 2014	Haleakala	Pan-STARRS 1	·	1.3 km	MPC · JPL
867541	2015 XN_{360}	—	October 8, 2015	Haleakala	Pan-STARRS 1	·	1.2 km	MPC · JPL
867542	2015 XO_{360}	—	December 12, 2015	Haleakala	Pan-STARRS 1	·	880 m	MPC · JPL
867543	2015 XD_{362}	—	December 2, 2010	Kitt Peak	Spacewatch	·	2.0 km	MPC · JPL
867544	2015 XQ_{365}	—	December 12, 2015	Haleakala	Pan-STARRS 1	V	550 m	MPC · JPL
867545	2015 XH_{367}	—	December 9, 2015	Mount Lemmon	Mount Lemmon Survey	·	570 m	MPC · JPL
867546	2015 XV_{367}	—	December 12, 2015	Haleakala	Pan-STARRS 1	·	1.8 km	MPC · JPL
867547	2015 XC_{368}	—	December 12, 2015	Haleakala	Pan-STARRS 1	·	450 m	MPC · JPL
867548	2015 XV_{369}	—	December 8, 2015	Mount Lemmon	Mount Lemmon Survey	·	830 m	MPC · JPL
867549	2015 XF_{371}	—	August 23, 2014	Haleakala	Pan-STARRS 1	EOS	1.4 km	MPC · JPL
867550	2015 XO_{372}	—	September 2, 2011	Haleakala	Pan-STARRS 1	·	550 m	MPC · JPL
867551	2015 XL_{375}	—	December 12, 2015	Haleakala	Pan-STARRS 1	·	1.9 km	MPC · JPL
867552	2015 XW_{375}	—	July 27, 2011	Haleakala	Pan-STARRS 1	·	640 m	MPC · JPL
867553	2015 XH_{376}	—	February 11, 2011	Mount Lemmon	Mount Lemmon Survey	HYG	1.5 km	MPC · JPL
867554	2015 XK_{376}	—	December 8, 2015	Mount Lemmon	Mount Lemmon Survey	·	660 m	MPC · JPL
867555	2015 XR_{376}	—	August 19, 2006	Kitt Peak	Spacewatch	T_{j} (2.98) · 3:2	3.4 km	MPC · JPL
867556	2015 XJ_{377}	—	December 12, 2015	Wildberg	R. Apitzsch	VER	2.0 km	MPC · JPL
867557	2015 XD_{378}	—	December 3, 2007	Catalina	CSS	·	850 m	MPC · JPL
867558	2015 XL_{378}	—	April 9, 2014	Mount Lemmon	Mount Lemmon Survey	·	360 m	MPC · JPL
867559	2015 XF_{379}	—	December 19, 2007	Mount Lemmon	Mount Lemmon Survey	H	510 m	MPC · JPL
867560	2015 XR_{380}	—	July 29, 2014	Haleakala	Pan-STARRS 1	EOS	1.3 km	MPC · JPL
867561	2015 XN_{381}	—	October 9, 2015	Haleakala	Pan-STARRS 1	·	1.4 km	MPC · JPL
867562	2015 XQ_{381}	—	October 9, 2015	Haleakala	Pan-STARRS 1	TIR	1.8 km	MPC · JPL
867563	2015 XJ_{383}	—	October 24, 2008	Kitt Peak	Spacewatch	·	500 m	MPC · JPL
867564	2015 XD_{384}	—	December 14, 2015	Calar Alto-CASADO	Hellmich, S., Mottola, S.	·	780 m	MPC · JPL
867565	2015 XY_{384}	—	December 4, 2015	Mount Lemmon	Mount Lemmon Survey	·	1.5 km	MPC · JPL
867566	2015 XO_{385}	—	November 11, 2007	Mount Lemmon	Mount Lemmon Survey	H	350 m	MPC · JPL
867567	2015 XQ_{386}	—	December 3, 2015	Haleakala	Pan-STARRS 1	H	400 m	MPC · JPL
867568	2015 XR_{386}	—	December 3, 2015	Haleakala	Pan-STARRS 1	H	340 m	MPC · JPL
867569	2015 XH_{387}	—	December 7, 2015	Haleakala	Pan-STARRS 1	H	310 m	MPC · JPL
867570	2015 XL_{387}	—	December 9, 2015	Haleakala	Pan-STARRS 1	H	370 m	MPC · JPL
867571	2015 XZ_{387}	—	December 5, 2010	Mount Lemmon	Mount Lemmon Survey	H	410 m	MPC · JPL
867572	2015 XB_{389}	—	December 13, 2015	Haleakala	Pan-STARRS 1	H	360 m	MPC · JPL
867573	2015 XE_{389}	—	June 2, 2014	Haleakala	Pan-STARRS 1	H	290 m	MPC · JPL
867574	2015 XD_{391}	—	December 8, 2015	Haleakala	Pan-STARRS 1	·	1.2 km	MPC · JPL
867575	2015 XM_{394}	—	December 9, 2015	Haleakala	Pan-STARRS 1	·	2.2 km	MPC · JPL
867576	2015 XG_{396}	—	November 20, 2006	Mount Lemmon	Mount Lemmon Survey	·	1.3 km	MPC · JPL
867577	2015 XK_{397}	—	December 13, 2015	Haleakala	Pan-STARRS 1	·	1.8 km	MPC · JPL
867578	2015 XV_{397}	—	December 4, 2015	Haleakala	Pan-STARRS 1	·	990 m	MPC · JPL
867579	2015 XE_{399}	—	September 26, 2008	Kitt Peak	Spacewatch	·	480 m	MPC · JPL
867580	2015 XA_{400}	—	November 17, 2014	Mount Lemmon	Mount Lemmon Survey	·	2.2 km	MPC · JPL
867581	2015 XN_{400}	—	August 19, 2014	Haleakala	Pan-STARRS 1	EOS	1.2 km	MPC · JPL
867582	2015 XO_{401}	—	December 4, 2015	Mount Lemmon	Mount Lemmon Survey	·	1.6 km	MPC · JPL
867583	2015 XW_{401}	—	February 13, 2011	Mount Lemmon	Mount Lemmon Survey	·	2.1 km	MPC · JPL
867584	2015 XU_{406}	—	December 4, 2015	Haleakala	Pan-STARRS 1	·	2.8 km	MPC · JPL
867585	2015 XK_{407}	—	August 28, 2014	Haleakala	Pan-STARRS 1	·	1.7 km	MPC · JPL
867586	2015 XR_{408}	—	December 6, 2015	Haleakala	Pan-STARRS 1	·	2.6 km	MPC · JPL
867587	2015 XN_{409}	—	December 4, 2015	Mount Lemmon	Mount Lemmon Survey	·	2.2 km	MPC · JPL
867588	2015 XV_{409}	—	September 20, 2009	Kitt Peak	Spacewatch	·	1.3 km	MPC · JPL
867589	2015 XC_{410}	—	October 1, 2014	Mount Lemmon	Mount Lemmon Survey	·	1.4 km	MPC · JPL
867590	2015 XE_{410}	—	August 27, 2014	Haleakala	Pan-STARRS 1	·	1.5 km	MPC · JPL
867591	2015 XP_{410}	—	December 8, 2015	Mount Lemmon	Mount Lemmon Survey	·	2.2 km	MPC · JPL
867592	2015 XE_{411}	—	December 8, 2015	Mount Lemmon	Mount Lemmon Survey	·	1.0 km	MPC · JPL
867593	2015 XW_{411}	—	December 8, 2015	Haleakala	Pan-STARRS 1	URS	2.5 km	MPC · JPL
867594	2015 XK_{412}	—	October 28, 2014	Haleakala	Pan-STARRS 1	·	2.1 km	MPC · JPL
867595	2015 XR_{412}	—	October 1, 2014	Haleakala	Pan-STARRS 1	TIR	2.0 km	MPC · JPL
867596	2015 XG_{413}	—	July 29, 2014	Haleakala	Pan-STARRS 1	·	1.2 km	MPC · JPL
867597	2015 XR_{415}	—	April 2, 2011	Kitt Peak	Spacewatch	·	1.7 km	MPC · JPL
867598	2015 XO_{416}	—	September 29, 2003	Kitt Peak	Spacewatch	·	2.1 km	MPC · JPL
867599	2015 XJ_{422}	—	June 9, 2004	Siding Spring	SSS	·	1.3 km	MPC · JPL
867600	2015 XM_{422}	—	December 8, 2015	Haleakala	Pan-STARRS 1	TIR	2.3 km	MPC · JPL

== 867601–867700 ==
back to top

Designation			Discovery			Properties		Ref
Permanent	Provisional	Named after	Date	Site	Discoverer(s)	Category	Diam.	Ref
867601	2015 XN_{422}	—	December 9, 2015	Haleakala	Pan-STARRS 1	·	1.7 km	MPC · JPL
867602	2015 XG_{423}	—	December 8, 2015	Mount Lemmon	Mount Lemmon Survey	·	1.4 km	MPC · JPL
867603	2015 XM_{423}	—	December 13, 2015	Haleakala	Pan-STARRS 1	·	2.0 km	MPC · JPL
867604	2015 XN_{426}	—	December 6, 2015	Haleakala	Pan-STARRS 1	·	1.4 km	MPC · JPL
867605	2015 XS_{426}	—	December 9, 2015	Mount Lemmon	Mount Lemmon Survey	DOR	1.6 km	MPC · JPL
867606	2015 XA_{430}	—	October 19, 2006	Catalina	CSS	EUN	840 m	MPC · JPL
867607	2015 XE_{431}	—	December 14, 2015	Haleakala	Pan-STARRS 1	·	550 m	MPC · JPL
867608	2015 XZ_{431}	—	December 13, 2015	Haleakala	Pan-STARRS 1	EUN	770 m	MPC · JPL
867609	2015 XN_{432}	—	December 3, 2015	Haleakala	Pan-STARRS 1	·	970 m	MPC · JPL
867610	2015 XA_{434}	—	December 8, 2015	Haleakala	Pan-STARRS 1	·	440 m	MPC · JPL
867611	2015 XQ_{434}	—	December 8, 2015	Haleakala	Pan-STARRS 1	·	390 m	MPC · JPL
867612	2015 XD_{435}	—	December 14, 2015	Haleakala	Pan-STARRS 1	·	3.0 km	MPC · JPL
867613	2015 XM_{436}	—	December 14, 2015	Mount Lemmon	Mount Lemmon Survey	·	1.1 km	MPC · JPL
867614	2015 XO_{436}	—	December 9, 2015	Mount Lemmon	Mount Lemmon Survey	·	960 m	MPC · JPL
867615	2015 XQ_{437}	—	December 6, 2015	Haleakala	Pan-STARRS 1	·	540 m	MPC · JPL
867616	2015 XK_{442}	—	December 13, 2015	Haleakala	Pan-STARRS 1	EOS	1.3 km	MPC · JPL
867617	2015 XW_{443}	—	December 4, 2015	Haleakala	Pan-STARRS 1	·	780 m	MPC · JPL
867618	2015 XQ_{444}	—	December 13, 2015	Haleakala	Pan-STARRS 1	·	1.3 km	MPC · JPL
867619	2015 XV_{444}	—	December 13, 2015	Haleakala	Pan-STARRS 1	EOS	1.5 km	MPC · JPL
867620	2015 XG_{445}	—	December 4, 2015	Mount Lemmon	Mount Lemmon Survey	VER	1.8 km	MPC · JPL
867621	2015 XN_{445}	—	December 10, 2015	Mount Lemmon	Mount Lemmon Survey	·	1.5 km	MPC · JPL
867622	2015 XS_{445}	—	December 9, 2015	Haleakala	Pan-STARRS 1	EUN	670 m	MPC · JPL
867623	2015 XU_{445}	—	December 13, 2015	Haleakala	Pan-STARRS 1	·	1.1 km	MPC · JPL
867624	2015 XL_{446}	—	December 6, 2015	Haleakala	Pan-STARRS 1	·	960 m	MPC · JPL
867625	2015 XY_{448}	—	February 8, 2011	Mount Lemmon	Mount Lemmon Survey	·	1.6 km	MPC · JPL
867626	2015 XL_{449}	—	December 12, 2015	Haleakala	Pan-STARRS 1	·	560 m	MPC · JPL
867627	2015 XP_{449}	—	August 13, 2004	Cerro Tololo	Deep Ecliptic Survey	·	550 m	MPC · JPL
867628	2015 XQ_{449}	—	December 18, 2014	Haleakala	Pan-STARRS 1	L5	7.8 km	MPC · JPL
867629	2015 XS_{449}	—	December 4, 2015	Haleakala	Pan-STARRS 1	·	2.1 km	MPC · JPL
867630	2015 XT_{449}	—	October 11, 2006	Kitt Peak	Spacewatch	EUN	770 m	MPC · JPL
867631	2015 XU_{449}	—	November 30, 2008	Kitt Peak	Spacewatch	(2076)	480 m	MPC · JPL
867632	2015 XP_{452}	—	December 9, 2015	Haleakala	Pan-STARRS 1	·	850 m	MPC · JPL
867633	2015 XS_{452}	—	December 14, 2015	Haleakala	Pan-STARRS 1	·	730 m	MPC · JPL
867634	2015 XM_{453}	—	April 2, 2014	Mount Lemmon	Mount Lemmon Survey	·	750 m	MPC · JPL
867635	2015 XV_{453}	—	December 14, 2015	Haleakala	Pan-STARRS 1	·	440 m	MPC · JPL
867636	2015 XQ_{454}	—	December 9, 2015	Haleakala	Pan-STARRS 1	·	1.8 km	MPC · JPL
867637	2015 XN_{456}	—	December 4, 2015	Haleakala	Pan-STARRS 1	·	1.4 km	MPC · JPL
867638	2015 XZ_{457}	—	December 6, 2015	Mount Lemmon	Mount Lemmon Survey	·	1.6 km	MPC · JPL
867639	2015 XD_{458}	—	December 3, 2015	Haleakala	Pan-STARRS 1	·	1.4 km	MPC · JPL
867640	2015 XE_{458}	—	December 4, 2015	Haleakala	Pan-STARRS 1	URS	2.3 km	MPC · JPL
867641	2015 XG_{458}	—	December 8, 2015	Haleakala	Pan-STARRS 1	·	2.1 km	MPC · JPL
867642	2015 XM_{458}	—	December 8, 2015	Haleakala	Pan-STARRS 1	·	1.7 km	MPC · JPL
867643	2015 XS_{458}	—	December 13, 2015	Haleakala	Pan-STARRS 1	·	490 m	MPC · JPL
867644	2015 XV_{458}	—	December 6, 2015	Mount Lemmon	Mount Lemmon Survey	·	570 m	MPC · JPL
867645	2015 XQ_{459}	—	December 8, 2015	Mount Lemmon	Mount Lemmon Survey	·	1.7 km	MPC · JPL
867646	2015 XS_{459}	—	December 5, 2015	Haleakala	Pan-STARRS 1	EOS	1.2 km	MPC · JPL
867647	2015 XW_{459}	—	December 7, 2015	Haleakala	Pan-STARRS 1	·	2.6 km	MPC · JPL
867648	2015 XX_{459}	—	December 8, 2015	Haleakala	Pan-STARRS 1	EOS	1.2 km	MPC · JPL
867649	2015 XY_{459}	—	December 8, 2015	Haleakala	Pan-STARRS 1	·	2.2 km	MPC · JPL
867650	2015 XB_{460}	—	December 3, 2015	Mount Lemmon	Mount Lemmon Survey	·	1.5 km	MPC · JPL
867651	2015 XC_{460}	—	December 6, 2015	Mount Lemmon	Mount Lemmon Survey	·	1.9 km	MPC · JPL
867652	2015 XF_{460}	—	December 8, 2015	Mount Lemmon	Mount Lemmon Survey	·	1.4 km	MPC · JPL
867653	2015 XH_{461}	—	December 9, 2015	Mount Lemmon	Mount Lemmon Survey	EOS	1.2 km	MPC · JPL
867654	2015 XT_{461}	—	December 8, 2015	Mount Lemmon	Mount Lemmon Survey	·	1.5 km	MPC · JPL
867655	2015 XN_{462}	—	December 9, 2015	Haleakala	Pan-STARRS 1	·	1.7 km	MPC · JPL
867656	2015 XS_{462}	—	December 4, 2015	Haleakala	Pan-STARRS 1	·	1.6 km	MPC · JPL
867657	2015 XD_{463}	—	December 14, 2015	Haleakala	Pan-STARRS 1	·	1.8 km	MPC · JPL
867658	2015 XR_{463}	—	December 14, 2015	Haleakala	Pan-STARRS 1	EOS	1.3 km	MPC · JPL
867659	2015 XT_{463}	—	December 8, 2015	Haleakala	Pan-STARRS 1	H	440 m	MPC · JPL
867660	2015 XC_{464}	—	December 13, 2015	Haleakala	Pan-STARRS 1	·	1.9 km	MPC · JPL
867661	2015 XV_{464}	—	December 14, 2015	Haleakala	Pan-STARRS 1	·	2.1 km	MPC · JPL
867662	2015 XG_{465}	—	December 9, 2015	Haleakala	Pan-STARRS 1	·	1.3 km	MPC · JPL
867663	2015 XW_{467}	—	December 10, 2015	Haleakala	Pan-STARRS 1	·	1.2 km	MPC · JPL
867664	2015 XF_{468}	—	December 4, 2015	Mount Lemmon	Mount Lemmon Survey	·	2.4 km	MPC · JPL
867665	2015 XO_{468}	—	December 13, 2015	Haleakala	Pan-STARRS 1	·	1.7 km	MPC · JPL
867666	2015 XT_{468}	—	December 7, 2015	Haleakala	Pan-STARRS 1	·	2.3 km	MPC · JPL
867667	2015 XX_{468}	—	December 6, 2015	Haleakala	Pan-STARRS 1	AEG	1.4 km	MPC · JPL
867668	2015 XZ_{470}	—	December 4, 2015	Haleakala	Pan-STARRS 1	L5	6.2 km	MPC · JPL
867669	2015 XB_{471}	—	December 7, 2015	Haleakala	Pan-STARRS 1	L5	6.0 km	MPC · JPL
867670	2015 XE_{471}	—	December 5, 2015	Haleakala	Pan-STARRS 1	·	450 m	MPC · JPL
867671	2015 XJ_{471}	—	December 6, 2015	Haleakala	Pan-STARRS 1	·	800 m	MPC · JPL
867672	2015 XY_{471}	—	December 5, 2015	Haleakala	Pan-STARRS 1	·	960 m	MPC · JPL
867673	2015 XZ_{471}	—	December 13, 2015	Haleakala	Pan-STARRS 1	·	1.4 km	MPC · JPL
867674	2015 XB_{472}	—	December 13, 2015	Haleakala	Pan-STARRS 1	L5	6.7 km	MPC · JPL
867675	2015 XX_{472}	—	December 5, 2015	Haleakala	Pan-STARRS 1	H	370 m	MPC · JPL
867676	2015 XK_{473}	—	December 6, 2015	Haleakala	Pan-STARRS 1	·	1.1 km	MPC · JPL
867677	2015 XR_{473}	—	December 9, 2015	Haleakala	Pan-STARRS 1	·	670 m	MPC · JPL
867678	2015 XU_{473}	—	December 7, 2015	Haleakala	Pan-STARRS 1	·	750 m	MPC · JPL
867679	2015 XZ_{473}	—	December 8, 2015	Haleakala	Pan-STARRS 1	·	540 m	MPC · JPL
867680	2015 XN_{474}	—	December 1, 2015	Haleakala	Pan-STARRS 1	·	560 m	MPC · JPL
867681	2015 XS_{474}	—	December 6, 2015	Mount Lemmon	Mount Lemmon Survey	·	550 m	MPC · JPL
867682	2015 XS_{475}	—	December 13, 2015	Haleakala	Pan-STARRS 1	·	880 m	MPC · JPL
867683	2015 XY_{475}	—	December 8, 2015	Mount Lemmon	Mount Lemmon Survey	·	2.5 km	MPC · JPL
867684	2015 XF_{476}	—	December 14, 2015	Haleakala	Pan-STARRS 1	·	390 m	MPC · JPL
867685	2015 XR_{476}	—	November 20, 2014	Mount Lemmon	Mount Lemmon Survey	L5	5.8 km	MPC · JPL
867686	2015 XS_{476}	—	November 17, 2014	Haleakala	Pan-STARRS 1	L5	6.8 km	MPC · JPL
867687	2015 XZ_{477}	—	December 12, 2015	Haleakala	Pan-STARRS 1	·	2.4 km	MPC · JPL
867688	2015 XG_{480}	—	December 13, 2015	Haleakala	Pan-STARRS 1	·	2.4 km	MPC · JPL
867689	2015 XA_{481}	—	December 3, 2015	Mount Lemmon	Mount Lemmon Survey	AGN	700 m	MPC · JPL
867690	2015 XD_{482}	—	December 14, 2015	Haleakala	Pan-STARRS 1	·	2.7 km	MPC · JPL
867691	2015 XL_{482}	—	December 4, 2015	Haleakala	Pan-STARRS 1	·	1.7 km	MPC · JPL
867692	2015 XT_{483}	—	December 7, 2015	Haleakala	Pan-STARRS 1	·	2.3 km	MPC · JPL
867693	2015 XM_{484}	—	December 9, 2015	Haleakala	Pan-STARRS 1	L5	8.5 km	MPC · JPL
867694	2015 XP_{485}	—	December 9, 2015	Haleakala	Pan-STARRS 1	TIR	1.9 km	MPC · JPL
867695	2015 XF_{486}	—	December 14, 2015	Haleakala	Pan-STARRS 1	·	2.2 km	MPC · JPL
867696	2015 XY_{486}	—	December 10, 2015	Mount Lemmon	Mount Lemmon Survey	H	430 m	MPC · JPL
867697	2015 XK_{490}	—	December 10, 2015	Mount Lemmon	Mount Lemmon Survey	EOS	1.2 km	MPC · JPL
867698	2015 XX_{493}	—	January 13, 2011	Kitt Peak	Spacewatch	TIN	940 m	MPC · JPL
867699	2015 XT_{497}	—	December 8, 2015	Mount Lemmon	Mount Lemmon Survey	·	560 m	MPC · JPL
867700	2015 XM_{499}	—	December 14, 2015	Haleakala	Pan-STARRS 1	·	560 m	MPC · JPL

== 867701–867800 ==
back to top

Designation			Discovery			Properties		Ref
Permanent	Provisional	Named after	Date	Site	Discoverer(s)	Category	Diam.	Ref
867701	2015 XX_{499}	—	December 3, 2015	Mount Lemmon	Mount Lemmon Survey	·	550 m	MPC · JPL
867702	2015 XU_{500}	—	December 5, 2015	Haleakala	Pan-STARRS 1	·	1.9 km	MPC · JPL
867703	2015 XY_{505}	—	June 27, 2014	Haleakala	Pan-STARRS 1	·	2.1 km	MPC · JPL
867704	2015 XB_{516}	—	December 6, 2015	Haleakala	Pan-STARRS 1	·	630 m	MPC · JPL
867705	2015 XO_{516}	—	December 4, 2015	Mount Lemmon	Mount Lemmon Survey	·	2.2 km	MPC · JPL
867706	2015 YW_{1}	—	April 16, 2004	Sacramento Peak	SDSS	H	390 m	MPC · JPL
867707	2015 YM_{3}	—	December 3, 2008	Mount Lemmon	Mount Lemmon Survey	·	840 m	MPC · JPL
867708	2015 YB_{4}	—	May 8, 2014	Mount Lemmon	Mount Lemmon Survey	H	370 m	MPC · JPL
867709	2015 YJ_{5}	—	January 28, 2011	Mount Lemmon	Mount Lemmon Survey	·	1.3 km	MPC · JPL
867710	2015 YN_{6}	—	March 8, 2013	Haleakala	Pan-STARRS 1	·	610 m	MPC · JPL
867711	2015 YK_{7}	—	February 7, 2011	Mount Lemmon	Mount Lemmon Survey	THM	1.7 km	MPC · JPL
867712	2015 YD_{8}	—	December 18, 2015	Oukaïmeden	M. Ory	PHO	560 m	MPC · JPL
867713	2015 YJ_{8}	—	September 29, 2009	Mount Lemmon	Mount Lemmon Survey	·	2.1 km	MPC · JPL
867714	2015 YG_{9}	—	November 22, 2015	Mount Lemmon	Mount Lemmon Survey	TIR	2.3 km	MPC · JPL
867715	2015 YH_{10}	—	December 31, 2015	Mount Lemmon	Mount Lemmon Survey	L5	7.0 km	MPC · JPL
867716	2015 YU_{10}	—	October 25, 2015	Haleakala	Pan-STARRS 1	·	2.8 km	MPC · JPL
867717	2015 YB_{14}	—	December 31, 2015	Haleakala	Pan-STARRS 1	ARM	2.3 km	MPC · JPL
867718	2015 YK_{14}	—	December 31, 2015	Haleakala	Pan-STARRS 1	·	2.2 km	MPC · JPL
867719	2015 YS_{14}	—	December 31, 2015	Haleakala	Pan-STARRS 1	·	1.4 km	MPC · JPL
867720	2015 YY_{14}	—	December 31, 2015	Haleakala	Pan-STARRS 1	·	2.1 km	MPC · JPL
867721	2015 YZ_{15}	—	April 12, 2011	Mount Lemmon	Mount Lemmon Survey	THB	1.9 km	MPC · JPL
867722	2015 YM_{17}	—	September 22, 2014	Haleakala	Pan-STARRS 1	TIR	1.7 km	MPC · JPL
867723	2015 YT_{17}	—	December 31, 2015	Haleakala	Pan-STARRS 1	·	1.7 km	MPC · JPL
867724	2015 YV_{19}	—	September 24, 2015	Mount Lemmon	Mount Lemmon Survey	·	1.0 km	MPC · JPL
867725	2015 YM_{22}	—	December 10, 2009	Mount Lemmon	Mount Lemmon Survey	THM	1.7 km	MPC · JPL
867726	2015 YN_{23}	—	December 18, 2015	Mount Lemmon	Mount Lemmon Survey	·	1.3 km	MPC · JPL
867727	2015 YG_{24}	—	February 12, 2011	Mount Lemmon	Mount Lemmon Survey	·	1.1 km	MPC · JPL
867728	2015 YQ_{24}	—	December 31, 2015	Haleakala	Pan-STARRS 1	·	1.9 km	MPC · JPL
867729	2015 YU_{27}	—	December 31, 2015	Haleakala	Pan-STARRS 1	·	1.6 km	MPC · JPL
867730	2015 YZ_{27}	—	July 13, 2013	Haleakala	Pan-STARRS 1	T_{j} (2.96)	2.7 km	MPC · JPL
867731	2015 YF_{28}	—	December 6, 2015	Mount Lemmon	Mount Lemmon Survey	·	2.7 km	MPC · JPL
867732	2015 YW_{31}	—	December 18, 2015	Mount Lemmon	Mount Lemmon Survey	·	1.6 km	MPC · JPL
867733	2015 YU_{32}	—	December 19, 2015	Mount Lemmon	Mount Lemmon Survey	H	450 m	MPC · JPL
867734	2015 YB_{33}	—	December 6, 2015	Mount Lemmon	Mount Lemmon Survey	THM	1.5 km	MPC · JPL
867735	2015 YL_{33}	—	December 20, 2015	Mount Lemmon	Mount Lemmon Survey	·	1.6 km	MPC · JPL
867736	2015 YM_{33}	—	December 30, 2015	Mount Lemmon	Mount Lemmon Survey	EUP	2.8 km	MPC · JPL
867737	2015 YU_{33}	—	December 18, 2015	Mount Lemmon	Mount Lemmon Survey	·	2.0 km	MPC · JPL
867738	2015 YE_{34}	—	December 19, 2015	Mount Lemmon	Mount Lemmon Survey	·	1.6 km	MPC · JPL
867739	2015 YR_{35}	—	December 18, 2015	Mount Lemmon	Mount Lemmon Survey	·	1.1 km	MPC · JPL
867740	2015 YA_{37}	—	December 18, 2015	Mount Lemmon	Mount Lemmon Survey	·	610 m	MPC · JPL
867741	2015 YC_{37}	—	December 17, 2015	Mount Lemmon	Mount Lemmon Survey	H	400 m	MPC · JPL
867742	2015 YG_{37}	—	December 16, 2015	Haleakala	Pan-STARRS 1	V	470 m	MPC · JPL
867743	2015 YZ_{38}	—	December 16, 2015	Catalina	CSS	PHO	560 m	MPC · JPL
867744	2015 YL_{40}	—	December 18, 2015	Mount Lemmon	Mount Lemmon Survey	·	520 m	MPC · JPL
867745	2016 AO_{1}	—	November 16, 2009	Mount Lemmon	Mount Lemmon Survey	·	1.6 km	MPC · JPL
867746	2016 AP_{1}	—	July 1, 2014	Haleakala	Pan-STARRS 1	·	1.1 km	MPC · JPL
867747	2016 AV_{2}	—	October 10, 2015	Haleakala	Pan-STARRS 1	·	800 m	MPC · JPL
867748	2016 AX_{3}	—	July 4, 2014	Haleakala	Pan-STARRS 1	EUN	850 m	MPC · JPL
867749	2016 AK_{6}	—	December 16, 2015	Mount Lemmon	Mount Lemmon Survey	·	2.9 km	MPC · JPL
867750	2016 AV_{13}	—	October 27, 2009	Kitt Peak	Spacewatch	THM	1.7 km	MPC · JPL
867751	2016 AL_{14}	—	January 3, 2016	Mount Lemmon	Mount Lemmon Survey	V	500 m	MPC · JPL
867752	2016 AY_{16}	—	January 22, 2013	Kitt Peak	Spacewatch	·	510 m	MPC · JPL
867753	2016 AE_{19}	—	September 7, 2008	Mount Lemmon	Mount Lemmon Survey	·	480 m	MPC · JPL
867754	2016 AZ_{19}	—	March 18, 2009	Mount Lemmon	Mount Lemmon Survey	MAS	540 m	MPC · JPL
867755	2016 AQ_{21}	—	January 3, 2016	Mount Lemmon	Mount Lemmon Survey	·	620 m	MPC · JPL
867756	2016 AE_{22}	—	August 20, 2014	Haleakala	Pan-STARRS 1	THM	1.4 km	MPC · JPL
867757	2016 AN_{23}	—	January 3, 2016	Haleakala	Pan-STARRS 1	·	860 m	MPC · JPL
867758	2016 AM_{24}	—	October 1, 2014	Haleakala	Pan-STARRS 1	·	1.9 km	MPC · JPL
867759	2016 AJ_{25}	—	October 24, 2003	Kitt Peak	Spacewatch	·	1.9 km	MPC · JPL
867760	2016 AJ_{26}	—	December 6, 2011	Haleakala	Pan-STARRS 1	·	850 m	MPC · JPL
867761	2016 AE_{31}	—	November 13, 2015	Mount Lemmon	Mount Lemmon Survey	·	910 m	MPC · JPL
867762	2016 AF_{31}	—	August 18, 2014	Haleakala	Pan-STARRS 1	·	1.3 km	MPC · JPL
867763	2016 AN_{33}	—	September 18, 2014	Roque de los Muchachos	EURONEAR	·	2.5 km	MPC · JPL
867764	2016 AU_{35}	—	October 1, 2008	Mount Lemmon	Mount Lemmon Survey	·	510 m	MPC · JPL
867765	2016 AY_{35}	—	February 5, 2011	Haleakala	Pan-STARRS 1	·	2.1 km	MPC · JPL
867766	2016 AZ_{35}	—	February 5, 2011	Haleakala	Pan-STARRS 1	·	1.5 km	MPC · JPL
867767	2016 AA_{37}	—	January 4, 2016	Haleakala	Pan-STARRS 1	HYG	2.0 km	MPC · JPL
867768	2016 AF_{40}	—	October 31, 2008	Mount Lemmon	Mount Lemmon Survey	·	520 m	MPC · JPL
867769	2016 AE_{41}	—	October 17, 2014	Mount Lemmon	Mount Lemmon Survey	·	2.3 km	MPC · JPL
867770	2016 AH_{43}	—	November 21, 2014	Haleakala	Pan-STARRS 1	L5	6.5 km	MPC · JPL
867771	2016 AT_{44}	—	September 1, 2014	Mount Lemmon	Mount Lemmon Survey	LIX	1.9 km	MPC · JPL
867772	2016 AP_{46}	—	October 17, 2014	Mount Lemmon	Mount Lemmon Survey	VER	1.8 km	MPC · JPL
867773	2016 AD_{48}	—	September 25, 2011	Haleakala	Pan-STARRS 1	·	730 m	MPC · JPL
867774	2016 AD_{49}	—	August 31, 2014	Kitt Peak	Spacewatch	·	1.9 km	MPC · JPL
867775	2016 AW_{51}	—	September 22, 2011	Kitt Peak	Spacewatch	·	680 m	MPC · JPL
867776	2016 AM_{56}	—	October 1, 2014	Haleakala	Pan-STARRS 1	·	2.3 km	MPC · JPL
867777	2016 AO_{56}	—	September 16, 2009	Kitt Peak	Spacewatch	·	1.1 km	MPC · JPL
867778	2016 AC_{57}	—	January 4, 2016	Haleakala	Pan-STARRS 1	NYS	820 m	MPC · JPL
867779	2016 AX_{57}	—	August 20, 2014	Haleakala	Pan-STARRS 1	·	1.2 km	MPC · JPL
867780	2016 AE_{58}	—	August 27, 2014	Haleakala	Pan-STARRS 1	·	1.7 km	MPC · JPL
867781	2016 AH_{58}	—	October 26, 2011	Haleakala	Pan-STARRS 1	CLA	1.0 km	MPC · JPL
867782	2016 AV_{59}	—	January 4, 2016	Haleakala	Pan-STARRS 1	VER	2.0 km	MPC · JPL
867783	2016 AC_{60}	—	October 14, 2009	Mount Lemmon	Mount Lemmon Survey	·	1.8 km	MPC · JPL
867784	2016 AO_{64}	—	January 4, 2016	Haleakala	Pan-STARRS 1	·	2.0 km	MPC · JPL
867785	2016 AP_{64}	—	December 3, 2015	Mount Lemmon	Mount Lemmon Survey	·	2.4 km	MPC · JPL
867786	2016 AS_{65}	—	January 7, 2016	Haleakala	Pan-STARRS 1	·	620 m	MPC · JPL
867787	2016 AB_{66}	—	December 7, 2008	Mount Lemmon	Mount Lemmon Survey	PHO	700 m	MPC · JPL
867788	2016 AX_{66}	—	March 25, 2012	Mount Lemmon	Mount Lemmon Survey	·	1.2 km	MPC · JPL
867789	2016 AR_{68}	—	October 26, 2009	Mount Lemmon	Mount Lemmon Survey	·	1.9 km	MPC · JPL
867790	2016 AX_{68}	—	October 2, 2014	Haleakala	Pan-STARRS 1	L5	7.1 km	MPC · JPL
867791	2016 AZ_{74}	—	November 8, 2015	Mount Lemmon	Mount Lemmon Survey	BAR	880 m	MPC · JPL
867792	2016 AP_{76}	—	January 18, 2009	Kitt Peak	Spacewatch	·	600 m	MPC · JPL
867793	2016 AN_{77}	—	January 4, 2016	Haleakala	Pan-STARRS 1	·	1.1 km	MPC · JPL
867794	2016 AO_{77}	—	December 21, 2015	Mount Lemmon	Mount Lemmon Survey	·	2.0 km	MPC · JPL
867795	2016 AX_{77}	—	January 4, 2016	Haleakala	Pan-STARRS 1	·	1.5 km	MPC · JPL
867796	2016 AA_{81}	—	October 17, 2012	Haleakala	Pan-STARRS 1	H	480 m	MPC · JPL
867797	2016 AL_{82}	—	November 12, 2015	Mount Lemmon	Mount Lemmon Survey	EUN	810 m	MPC · JPL
867798	2016 AF_{83}	—	November 22, 2015	Mount Lemmon	Mount Lemmon Survey	·	1.7 km	MPC · JPL
867799	2016 AS_{83}	—	December 7, 2015	Haleakala	Pan-STARRS 1	H	340 m	MPC · JPL
867800	2016 AS_{84}	—	November 3, 2015	Mount Lemmon	Mount Lemmon Survey	·	1.8 km	MPC · JPL

== 867801–867900 ==
back to top

Designation			Discovery			Properties		Ref
Permanent	Provisional	Named after	Date	Site	Discoverer(s)	Category	Diam.	Ref
867801	2016 AW_{84}	—	January 9, 2006	Kitt Peak	Spacewatch	·	1.5 km	MPC · JPL
867802	2016 AW_{85}	—	February 5, 2011	Haleakala	Pan-STARRS 1	·	1.8 km	MPC · JPL
867803	2016 AT_{86}	—	October 27, 2008	Kitt Peak	Spacewatch	·	480 m	MPC · JPL
867804	2016 AC_{87}	—	December 14, 2015	Mount Lemmon	Mount Lemmon Survey	V	430 m	MPC · JPL
867805	2016 AR_{87}	—	January 2, 2006	Mount Lemmon	Mount Lemmon Survey	·	490 m	MPC · JPL
867806	2016 AY_{88}	—	December 19, 2015	Mount Lemmon	Mount Lemmon Survey	GAL	1.2 km	MPC · JPL
867807	2016 AR_{89}	—	December 8, 2015	Mount Lemmon	Mount Lemmon Survey	·	1.5 km	MPC · JPL
867808	2016 AK_{90}	—	July 2, 2014	Haleakala	Pan-STARRS 1	·	2.6 km	MPC · JPL
867809	2016 AC_{92}	—	November 1, 2015	Mount Lemmon	Mount Lemmon Survey	PHO	780 m	MPC · JPL
867810	2016 AR_{93}	—	February 27, 2009	Kitt Peak	Spacewatch	·	780 m	MPC · JPL
867811	2016 AY_{93}	—	October 17, 2012	Haleakala	Pan-STARRS 1	H	430 m	MPC · JPL
867812	2016 AY_{94}	—	January 7, 2016	Haleakala	Pan-STARRS 1	(1118)	2.4 km	MPC · JPL
867813	2016 AS_{96}	—	July 30, 2008	Mount Lemmon	Mount Lemmon Survey	·	2.5 km	MPC · JPL
867814	2016 AK_{98}	—	January 7, 2016	Haleakala	Pan-STARRS 1	·	490 m	MPC · JPL
867815	2016 AK_{99}	—	January 7, 2016	Haleakala	Pan-STARRS 1	·	2.1 km	MPC · JPL
867816	2016 AB_{100}	—	January 7, 2016	Haleakala	Pan-STARRS 1	·	1.5 km	MPC · JPL
867817	2016 AM_{101}	—	January 7, 2016	Haleakala	Pan-STARRS 1	·	2.0 km	MPC · JPL
867818	2016 AB_{102}	—	October 24, 2011	Kitt Peak	Spacewatch	·	620 m	MPC · JPL
867819	2016 AR_{102}	—	December 7, 1999	Socorro	LINEAR	·	1.2 km	MPC · JPL
867820	2016 AS_{102}	—	January 7, 2016	Haleakala	Pan-STARRS 1	·	2.1 km	MPC · JPL
867821	2016 AY_{102}	—	October 24, 2014	Mount Lemmon	Mount Lemmon Survey	·	2.1 km	MPC · JPL
867822	2016 AD_{104}	—	January 7, 2016	Haleakala	Pan-STARRS 1	·	2.5 km	MPC · JPL
867823	2016 AS_{104}	—	November 24, 2011	Mount Lemmon	Mount Lemmon Survey	·	630 m	MPC · JPL
867824	2016 AC_{109}	—	January 7, 2016	Haleakala	Pan-STARRS 1	·	2.3 km	MPC · JPL
867825	2016 AL_{109}	—	October 27, 2009	Mount Lemmon	Mount Lemmon Survey	·	1.6 km	MPC · JPL
867826	2016 AW_{111}	—	September 28, 2006	Catalina	CSS	·	900 m	MPC · JPL
867827	2016 AC_{112}	—	January 7, 2016	Haleakala	Pan-STARRS 1	THM	1.8 km	MPC · JPL
867828	2016 AE_{112}	—	January 4, 2016	Haleakala	Pan-STARRS 1	·	2.1 km	MPC · JPL
867829	2016 AP_{112}	—	August 28, 2014	Haleakala	Pan-STARRS 1	·	1.5 km	MPC · JPL
867830	2016 AS_{116}	—	May 15, 2009	Kitt Peak	Spacewatch	NYS	870 m	MPC · JPL
867831	2016 AZ_{117}	—	June 20, 2013	Haleakala	Pan-STARRS 1	·	960 m	MPC · JPL
867832	2016 AT_{118}	—	October 27, 2014	Haleakala	Pan-STARRS 1	·	2.5 km	MPC · JPL
867833	2016 AT_{119}	—	January 8, 2016	Haleakala	Pan-STARRS 1	·	600 m	MPC · JPL
867834	2016 AD_{120}	—	July 14, 2013	Haleakala	Pan-STARRS 1	·	2.4 km	MPC · JPL
867835	2016 AK_{122}	—	February 28, 2012	Haleakala	Pan-STARRS 1	·	900 m	MPC · JPL
867836	2016 AJ_{124}	—	February 9, 2005	Mount Lemmon	Mount Lemmon Survey	·	2.1 km	MPC · JPL
867837	2016 AN_{124}	—	August 22, 2014	Haleakala	Pan-STARRS 1	H	360 m	MPC · JPL
867838	2016 AV_{124}	—	September 20, 2011	Kitt Peak	Spacewatch	·	630 m	MPC · JPL
867839	2016 AM_{129}	—	March 23, 2012	Kitt Peak	Spacewatch	·	1.0 km	MPC · JPL
867840	2016 AO_{131}	—	January 11, 2016	Haleakala	Pan-STARRS 1	APO · fast	50 m	MPC · JPL
867841	2016 AF_{138}	—	September 30, 2011	Kitt Peak	Spacewatch	·	510 m	MPC · JPL
867842	2016 AS_{138}	—	January 9, 2016	Haleakala	Pan-STARRS 1	·	2.1 km	MPC · JPL
867843	2016 AO_{139}	—	December 10, 2009	Mount Lemmon	Mount Lemmon Survey	·	1.8 km	MPC · JPL
867844	2016 AN_{141}	—	October 25, 2014	Mount Lemmon	Mount Lemmon Survey	·	1.8 km	MPC · JPL
867845	2016 AO_{143}	—	October 22, 2014	Mount Lemmon	Mount Lemmon Survey	·	2.2 km	MPC · JPL
867846	2016 AG_{145}	—	December 6, 2015	Haleakala	Pan-STARRS 1	·	2.0 km	MPC · JPL
867847	2016 AT_{145}	—	January 9, 2016	Haleakala	Pan-STARRS 1	·	2.1 km	MPC · JPL
867848	2016 AA_{146}	—	December 6, 2015	Haleakala	Pan-STARRS 1	·	1.8 km	MPC · JPL
867849	2016 AE_{146}	—	November 16, 2014	Mount Lemmon	Mount Lemmon Survey	EOS	1.4 km	MPC · JPL
867850	2016 AT_{146}	—	January 9, 2016	Haleakala	Pan-STARRS 1	·	2.7 km	MPC · JPL
867851	2016 AY_{149}	—	December 6, 2015	Haleakala	Pan-STARRS 1	·	980 m	MPC · JPL
867852	2016 AK_{151}	—	January 11, 2016	Haleakala	Pan-STARRS 1	·	2.1 km	MPC · JPL
867853	2016 AS_{152}	—	January 11, 2016	Haleakala	Pan-STARRS 1	(194)	1.2 km	MPC · JPL
867854	2016 AL_{154}	—	April 19, 2009	Kitt Peak	Spacewatch	PHO	620 m	MPC · JPL
867855	2016 AJ_{155}	—	March 6, 2011	Kitt Peak	Spacewatch	·	2.1 km	MPC · JPL
867856	2016 AD_{158}	—	January 11, 2016	Haleakala	Pan-STARRS 1	·	2.2 km	MPC · JPL
867857	2016 AW_{166}	—	January 9, 2016	Haleakala	Pan-STARRS 1	·	2.0 km	MPC · JPL
867858	2016 AU_{168}	—	October 28, 2014	Haleakala	Pan-STARRS 1	·	2.4 km	MPC · JPL
867859	2016 AV_{168}	—	May 14, 2012	Mount Lemmon	Mount Lemmon Survey	EOS	1.4 km	MPC · JPL
867860	2016 AZ_{170}	—	June 29, 2014	Haleakala	Pan-STARRS 1	·	2.0 km	MPC · JPL
867861	2016 AM_{172}	—	January 12, 2016	Haleakala	Pan-STARRS 1	·	770 m	MPC · JPL
867862	2016 AR_{172}	—	November 13, 2010	Mount Lemmon	Mount Lemmon Survey	·	1.3 km	MPC · JPL
867863	2016 AA_{175}	—	December 5, 2015	Haleakala	Pan-STARRS 1	·	1.5 km	MPC · JPL
867864	2016 AS_{177}	—	October 16, 2014	Kitt Peak	Spacewatch	·	2.3 km	MPC · JPL
867865	2016 AJ_{179}	—	December 8, 2015	Haleakala	Pan-STARRS 1	PHO	600 m	MPC · JPL
867866	2016 AF_{180}	—	December 13, 2015	Haleakala	Pan-STARRS 1	·	2.4 km	MPC · JPL
867867	2016 AK_{181}	—	December 13, 2015	Haleakala	Pan-STARRS 1	·	1.6 km	MPC · JPL
867868	2016 AN_{182}	—	July 16, 2013	Haleakala	Pan-STARRS 1	MAR	760 m	MPC · JPL
867869	2016 AV_{182}	—	December 13, 2015	Haleakala	Pan-STARRS 1	·	2.1 km	MPC · JPL
867870	2016 AX_{183}	—	December 9, 2015	Haleakala	Pan-STARRS 1	·	2.2 km	MPC · JPL
867871	2016 AQ_{187}	—	January 3, 2016	Mount Lemmon	Mount Lemmon Survey	DOR	1.5 km	MPC · JPL
867872	2016 AP_{190}	—	October 8, 2008	Kitt Peak	Spacewatch	·	2.3 km	MPC · JPL
867873	2016 AF_{195}	—	July 1, 2014	Haleakala	Pan-STARRS 1	H	380 m	MPC · JPL
867874	2016 AJ_{195}	—	January 12, 2016	Haleakala	Pan-STARRS 1	H	340 m	MPC · JPL
867875	2016 AN_{195}	—	July 4, 2014	Haleakala	Pan-STARRS 1	H	380 m	MPC · JPL
867876	2016 AO_{195}	—	January 14, 2016	Haleakala	Pan-STARRS 1	H	360 m	MPC · JPL
867877	2016 AC_{196}	—	February 22, 2011	Kitt Peak	Spacewatch	H	340 m	MPC · JPL
867878	2016 AL_{197}	—	January 9, 2016	Haleakala	Pan-STARRS 1	H	490 m	MPC · JPL
867879	2016 AB_{199}	—	May 10, 2014	Mount Lemmon	Mount Lemmon Survey	H	380 m	MPC · JPL
867880	2016 AP_{199}	—	January 12, 2016	Kitt Peak	Spacewatch	H	250 m	MPC · JPL
867881	2016 AT_{199}	—	January 13, 2016	Mount Lemmon	Mount Lemmon Survey	H	360 m	MPC · JPL
867882	2016 AX_{199}	—	February 9, 2008	Kitt Peak	Spacewatch	H	310 m	MPC · JPL
867883	2016 AY_{199}	—	January 13, 2016	Haleakala	Pan-STARRS 1	H	340 m	MPC · JPL
867884	2016 AB_{201}	—	December 11, 2010	Mount Lemmon	Mount Lemmon Survey	·	2.2 km	MPC · JPL
867885	2016 AR_{201}	—	December 20, 2004	Mount Lemmon	Mount Lemmon Survey	·	1.8 km	MPC · JPL
867886	2016 AH_{202}	—	January 3, 2016	Haleakala	Pan-STARRS 1	·	2.2 km	MPC · JPL
867887	2016 AZ_{202}	—	January 3, 2016	Haleakala	Pan-STARRS 1	·	1.9 km	MPC · JPL
867888	2016 AH_{203}	—	January 3, 2016	Haleakala	Pan-STARRS 1	EUP	2.4 km	MPC · JPL
867889	2016 AJ_{204}	—	January 4, 2016	Haleakala	Pan-STARRS 1	·	1.2 km	MPC · JPL
867890	2016 AD_{206}	—	January 7, 2016	Haleakala	Pan-STARRS 1	·	2.0 km	MPC · JPL
867891	2016 AT_{207}	—	January 7, 2016	Haleakala	Pan-STARRS 1	·	1.5 km	MPC · JPL
867892	2016 AK_{213}	—	January 14, 2016	Haleakala	Pan-STARRS 1	·	2.0 km	MPC · JPL
867893	2016 AP_{215}	—	October 14, 2007	Mount Lemmon	Mount Lemmon Survey	·	810 m	MPC · JPL
867894	2016 AJ_{222}	—	August 8, 2005	Cerro Tololo	Deep Ecliptic Survey	·	1.1 km	MPC · JPL
867895	2016 AW_{227}	—	August 29, 2014	Mount Lemmon	Mount Lemmon Survey	·	1.8 km	MPC · JPL
867896	2016 AU_{229}	—	November 17, 2014	Haleakala	Pan-STARRS 1	·	1.7 km	MPC · JPL
867897	2016 AY_{230}	—	August 6, 2014	Haleakala	Pan-STARRS 1	·	1.4 km	MPC · JPL
867898	2016 AC_{231}	—	January 3, 2016	Haleakala	Pan-STARRS 1	·	800 m	MPC · JPL
867899	2016 AP_{232}	—	January 13, 2016	Haleakala	Pan-STARRS 1	·	630 m	MPC · JPL
867900	2016 AQ_{232}	—	December 18, 2015	Mount Lemmon	Mount Lemmon Survey	·	1.3 km	MPC · JPL

== 867901–868000 ==
back to top

Designation			Discovery			Properties		Ref
Permanent	Provisional	Named after	Date	Site	Discoverer(s)	Category	Diam.	Ref
867901	2016 AU_{232}	—	November 24, 2011	Mount Lemmon	Mount Lemmon Survey	·	630 m	MPC · JPL
867902	2016 AM_{240}	—	July 13, 2013	Haleakala	Pan-STARRS 1	·	2.3 km	MPC · JPL
867903	2016 AD_{241}	—	June 28, 2014	Haleakala	Pan-STARRS 1	·	460 m	MPC · JPL
867904	2016 AM_{241}	—	October 30, 2005	Kitt Peak	Spacewatch	·	1.2 km	MPC · JPL
867905	2016 AP_{241}	—	January 30, 2011	Mount Lemmon	Mount Lemmon Survey	EOS	1.3 km	MPC · JPL
867906	2016 AS_{241}	—	January 3, 2016	Haleakala	Pan-STARRS 1	·	2.2 km	MPC · JPL
867907	2016 AY_{241}	—	October 1, 2014	Haleakala	Pan-STARRS 1	·	1.8 km	MPC · JPL
867908	2016 AC_{242}	—	January 3, 2016	Haleakala	Pan-STARRS 1	·	870 m	MPC · JPL
867909	2016 AH_{242}	—	January 3, 2016	Haleakala	Pan-STARRS 1	·	1.3 km	MPC · JPL
867910	2016 AM_{242}	—	July 28, 2014	Haleakala	Pan-STARRS 1	·	930 m	MPC · JPL
867911	2016 AX_{243}	—	January 3, 2016	Haleakala	Pan-STARRS 1	·	670 m	MPC · JPL
867912	2016 AG_{244}	—	October 5, 2014	Mount Lemmon	Mount Lemmon Survey	URS	2.7 km	MPC · JPL
867913	2016 AK_{244}	—	July 14, 2013	Haleakala	Pan-STARRS 1	·	2.1 km	MPC · JPL
867914	2016 AF_{246}	—	July 13, 2013	Haleakala	Pan-STARRS 1	URS	2.2 km	MPC · JPL
867915	2016 AP_{246}	—	January 3, 2016	Mount Lemmon	Mount Lemmon Survey	·	2.3 km	MPC · JPL
867916	2016 AU_{246}	—	January 3, 2016	Mount Lemmon	Mount Lemmon Survey	·	1.6 km	MPC · JPL
867917	2016 AA_{248}	—	November 18, 2009	Kitt Peak	Spacewatch	·	1.9 km	MPC · JPL
867918	2016 AB_{248}	—	February 5, 2011	Haleakala	Pan-STARRS 1	·	1.4 km	MPC · JPL
867919	2016 AD_{248}	—	August 22, 2014	Haleakala	Pan-STARRS 1	·	570 m	MPC · JPL
867920	2016 AM_{248}	—	January 4, 2016	Haleakala	Pan-STARRS 1	V	430 m	MPC · JPL
867921	2016 AA_{251}	—	October 1, 2014	Haleakala	Pan-STARRS 1	EOS	1.2 km	MPC · JPL
867922	2016 AJ_{252}	—	November 26, 2014	Mount Lemmon	Mount Lemmon Survey	·	1.2 km	MPC · JPL
867923	2016 AH_{255}	—	September 19, 2014	Haleakala	Pan-STARRS 1	·	2.0 km	MPC · JPL
867924	2016 AN_{255}	—	November 23, 2009	Kitt Peak	Spacewatch	·	2.3 km	MPC · JPL
867925	2016 AK_{256}	—	August 25, 2014	Haleakala	Pan-STARRS 1	·	2.0 km	MPC · JPL
867926	2016 AL_{256}	—	October 29, 2014	Haleakala	Pan-STARRS 1	·	2.3 km	MPC · JPL
867927	2016 AZ_{256}	—	September 13, 2014	Haleakala	Pan-STARRS 1	TIR	1.8 km	MPC · JPL
867928	2016 AB_{257}	—	January 29, 2012	Kitt Peak	Spacewatch	MAR	650 m	MPC · JPL
867929	2016 AJ_{257}	—	November 25, 2014	Haleakala	Pan-STARRS 1	·	2.3 km	MPC · JPL
867930	2016 AO_{257}	—	January 7, 2016	Haleakala	Pan-STARRS 1	·	1.6 km	MPC · JPL
867931	2016 AD_{258}	—	October 25, 2014	Haleakala	Pan-STARRS 1	·	1.4 km	MPC · JPL
867932	2016 AQ_{258}	—	March 29, 2011	Mount Lemmon	Mount Lemmon Survey	·	1.9 km	MPC · JPL
867933	2016 AN_{260}	—	January 8, 2016	Haleakala	Pan-STARRS 1	·	1.4 km	MPC · JPL
867934	2016 AZ_{260}	—	November 27, 2014	Haleakala	Pan-STARRS 1	EOS	1.3 km	MPC · JPL
867935	2016 AX_{263}	—	October 22, 2014	Mount Lemmon	Mount Lemmon Survey	·	2.0 km	MPC · JPL
867936	2016 AT_{266}	—	January 10, 2016	Haleakala	Pan-STARRS 1	TIR	2.1 km	MPC · JPL
867937	2016 AB_{267}	—	November 24, 2003	Kitt Peak	Spacewatch	·	1.8 km	MPC · JPL
867938	2016 AR_{267}	—	October 29, 2014	Haleakala	Pan-STARRS 1	·	1.8 km	MPC · JPL
867939	2016 AW_{268}	—	October 30, 2014	Mount Lemmon	Mount Lemmon Survey	·	2.0 km	MPC · JPL
867940	2016 AA_{269}	—	January 12, 2016	Kitt Peak	Spacewatch	VER	2.1 km	MPC · JPL
867941	2016 AH_{269}	—	October 21, 2014	Mount Lemmon	Mount Lemmon Survey	·	2.0 km	MPC · JPL
867942	2016 AJ_{269}	—	October 1, 2014	Haleakala	Pan-STARRS 1	·	1.9 km	MPC · JPL
867943	2016 AF_{270}	—	October 23, 2003	Kitt Peak	Spacewatch	·	1.9 km	MPC · JPL
867944	2016 AB_{271}	—	October 28, 2014	Haleakala	Pan-STARRS 1	·	2.0 km	MPC · JPL
867945	2016 AU_{273}	—	October 28, 2014	Haleakala	Pan-STARRS 1	·	2.2 km	MPC · JPL
867946	2016 AL_{274}	—	May 1, 2011	Haleakala	Pan-STARRS 1	·	2.2 km	MPC · JPL
867947	2016 AW_{274}	—	November 16, 1998	Kitt Peak	Spacewatch	·	1.6 km	MPC · JPL
867948	2016 AJ_{275}	—	January 14, 2016	Haleakala	Pan-STARRS 1	·	760 m	MPC · JPL
867949	2016 AN_{275}	—	November 17, 2014	Mount Lemmon	Mount Lemmon Survey	·	1.7 km	MPC · JPL
867950	2016 AK_{276}	—	November 22, 2014	Haleakala	Pan-STARRS 1	·	2.3 km	MPC · JPL
867951	2016 AS_{276}	—	March 13, 2011	Mount Lemmon	Mount Lemmon Survey	·	2.4 km	MPC · JPL
867952	2016 AU_{276}	—	March 6, 2011	Mount Lemmon	Mount Lemmon Survey	·	1.4 km	MPC · JPL
867953	2016 AW_{279}	—	January 3, 2016	Haleakala	Pan-STARRS 1	·	980 m	MPC · JPL
867954	2016 AZ_{279}	—	January 9, 2016	Haleakala	Pan-STARRS 1	VER	2.0 km	MPC · JPL
867955	2016 AH_{280}	—	September 12, 2007	Catalina	CSS	·	910 m	MPC · JPL
867956	2016 AL_{280}	—	January 8, 2016	Haleakala	Pan-STARRS 1	H	310 m	MPC · JPL
867957	2016 AW_{280}	—	January 4, 2016	Haleakala	Pan-STARRS 1	·	1.4 km	MPC · JPL
867958	2016 AA_{281}	—	January 11, 2016	Haleakala	Pan-STARRS 1	·	660 m	MPC · JPL
867959	2016 AH_{282}	—	January 4, 2016	Haleakala	Pan-STARRS 1	·	510 m	MPC · JPL
867960	2016 AW_{283}	—	January 8, 2016	Haleakala	Pan-STARRS 1	·	900 m	MPC · JPL
867961	2016 AL_{284}	—	January 7, 2016	Haleakala	Pan-STARRS 1	·	1.1 km	MPC · JPL
867962	2016 AO_{284}	—	January 3, 2016	Haleakala	Pan-STARRS 1	·	2.0 km	MPC · JPL
867963	2016 AU_{284}	—	January 9, 2016	Haleakala	Pan-STARRS 1	PHO	540 m	MPC · JPL
867964	2016 AV_{284}	—	January 7, 2016	Haleakala	Pan-STARRS 1	·	1.1 km	MPC · JPL
867965	2016 AL_{285}	—	January 7, 2016	Haleakala	Pan-STARRS 1	·	1.5 km	MPC · JPL
867966	2016 AG_{287}	—	January 15, 2016	Haleakala	Pan-STARRS 1	·	2.1 km	MPC · JPL
867967	2016 AC_{288}	—	February 12, 2002	Kitt Peak	Spacewatch	·	1.2 km	MPC · JPL
867968	2016 AD_{288}	—	January 12, 2016	Haleakala	Pan-STARRS 1	H	410 m	MPC · JPL
867969	2016 AV_{288}	—	January 14, 2016	Haleakala	Pan-STARRS 1	(5)	860 m	MPC · JPL
867970	2016 AN_{290}	—	January 12, 2016	Haleakala	Pan-STARRS 1	·	740 m	MPC · JPL
867971	2016 AW_{290}	—	January 14, 2016	Haleakala	Pan-STARRS 1	·	1.6 km	MPC · JPL
867972	2016 AN_{291}	—	October 11, 2006	Palomar	NEAT	·	1.2 km	MPC · JPL
867973	2016 AZ_{291}	—	January 11, 2016	Haleakala	Pan-STARRS 1	H	380 m	MPC · JPL
867974	2016 AB_{293}	—	January 2, 2016	Catalina	CSS	PHO	760 m	MPC · JPL
867975	2016 AN_{293}	—	January 2, 2016	Kitt Peak	Spacewatch	·	520 m	MPC · JPL
867976	2016 AV_{294}	—	January 3, 2016	Mount Lemmon	Mount Lemmon Survey	·	2.6 km	MPC · JPL
867977	2016 AY_{294}	—	January 14, 2016	Haleakala	Pan-STARRS 1	H	410 m	MPC · JPL
867978	2016 AG_{295}	—	January 4, 2016	Haleakala	Pan-STARRS 1	·	2.4 km	MPC · JPL
867979	2016 AX_{295}	—	January 4, 2016	Haleakala	Pan-STARRS 1	·	2.2 km	MPC · JPL
867980	2016 AC_{300}	—	January 14, 2016	Haleakala	Pan-STARRS 1	·	2.6 km	MPC · JPL
867981	2016 AU_{300}	—	March 8, 2005	Mount Lemmon	Mount Lemmon Survey	MAS	570 m	MPC · JPL
867982	2016 AL_{303}	—	January 14, 2016	Haleakala	Pan-STARRS 1	HYG	1.9 km	MPC · JPL
867983	2016 AK_{304}	—	January 14, 2016	Mount Lemmon	Mount Lemmon Survey	·	1.8 km	MPC · JPL
867984	2016 AL_{304}	—	January 3, 2016	Haleakala	Pan-STARRS 1	VER	1.9 km	MPC · JPL
867985	2016 AX_{304}	—	January 8, 2016	Haleakala	Pan-STARRS 1	·	2.4 km	MPC · JPL
867986	2016 AF_{305}	—	January 7, 2016	Haleakala	Pan-STARRS 1	·	2.3 km	MPC · JPL
867987	2016 AL_{305}	—	January 13, 2016	Haleakala	Pan-STARRS 1	·	2.2 km	MPC · JPL
867988	2016 AT_{306}	—	January 15, 2016	Haleakala	Pan-STARRS 1	·	770 m	MPC · JPL
867989	2016 AU_{307}	—	January 4, 2016	Haleakala	Pan-STARRS 1	·	1.3 km	MPC · JPL
867990	2016 AN_{308}	—	January 4, 2016	Haleakala	Pan-STARRS 1	·	1.5 km	MPC · JPL
867991	2016 AO_{308}	—	January 13, 2016	Haleakala	Pan-STARRS 1	·	2.3 km	MPC · JPL
867992	2016 AW_{308}	—	January 13, 2016	Haleakala	Pan-STARRS 1	·	650 m	MPC · JPL
867993	2016 AE_{309}	—	January 7, 2016	Haleakala	Pan-STARRS 1	·	850 m	MPC · JPL
867994	2016 AW_{309}	—	January 9, 2016	Haleakala	Pan-STARRS 1	·	880 m	MPC · JPL
867995	2016 AH_{310}	—	January 13, 2016	Mount Lemmon	Mount Lemmon Survey	VER	2.2 km	MPC · JPL
867996	2016 AG_{311}	—	January 3, 2016	Haleakala	Pan-STARRS 1	(2076)	500 m	MPC · JPL
867997	2016 AB_{312}	—	January 4, 2016	Haleakala	Pan-STARRS 1	·	960 m	MPC · JPL
867998	2016 AL_{312}	—	January 4, 2016	Haleakala	Pan-STARRS 1	·	900 m	MPC · JPL
867999	2016 AO_{313}	—	January 4, 2016	Haleakala	Pan-STARRS 1	L5	6.4 km	MPC · JPL
868000	2016 AX_{313}	—	January 7, 2016	Haleakala	Pan-STARRS 1	·	870 m	MPC · JPL

back to top
