= List of minor planets: 824001–825000 =

The following is a partial list of minor planets, running from minor-planet number 824001 through 825000, inclusive. The primary data for this and other partial lists is based on JPL's "Small-Body Orbital Elements" and data available from the Minor Planet Center. Critical list information is also provided by the MPC, unless otherwise specified from Lowell Observatory. A detailed description of the table's columns and additional sources are given on the main page including a complete list of every page in this series, and a statistical break-up on the dynamical classification of minor planets.

Also see the summary list of all named bodies in numerical and alphabetical order, and the corresponding naming citations for the number range of this particular list. New namings may only be added to this list after official publication, as the preannouncement of names is condemned by the Working Group for Small Bodies Nomenclature of the International Astronomical Union.

Near-Earth obj.	MBA (inner)	MBA (outer)	Centaur
Mars-crosser	MBA (middle)	Jupiter trojan	Trans-Neptunian obj.
Unclassified

== 824001–824100 ==
Designation			Discovery			Properties		Ref
Permanent	Provisional	Named after	Date	Site	Discoverer(s)	Category	Diam.	Ref
824001	2016 QC_{28}	—	August 26, 2016	Haleakala	Pan-STARRS 1	·	540 m	MPC · JPL
824002	2016 QU_{31}	—	August 2, 2016	Haleakala	Pan-STARRS 1	(5)	760 m	MPC · JPL
824003	2016 QW_{33}	—	August 23, 2007	Kitt Peak	Spacewatch	·	1.2 km	MPC · JPL
824004	2016 QY_{34}	—	September 14, 2007	Kitt Peak	Spacewatch	·	1.2 km	MPC · JPL
824005	2016 QT_{38}	—	August 26, 2012	Kitt Peak	Spacewatch	·	1.3 km	MPC · JPL
824006	2016 QP_{42}	—	July 14, 2016	Haleakala	Pan-STARRS 1	·	760 m	MPC · JPL
824007	2016 QB_{46}	—	October 8, 2012	Haleakala	Pan-STARRS 1	·	1.1 km	MPC · JPL
824008	2016 QL_{46}	—	October 10, 2012	Kislovodsk	ISON-Kislovodsk Observatory	·	1.5 km	MPC · JPL
824009	2016 QT_{47}	—	August 31, 2005	Palomar	NEAT	NYS	820 m	MPC · JPL
824010	2016 QG_{50}	—	September 12, 2007	Mount Lemmon	Mount Lemmon Survey	·	1.3 km	MPC · JPL
824011	2016 QQ_{53}	—	March 16, 2012	Mount Lemmon	Mount Lemmon Survey	·	510 m	MPC · JPL
824012	2016 QY_{56}	—	July 11, 2016	Haleakala	Pan-STARRS 1	·	560 m	MPC · JPL
824013	2016 QM_{59}	—	June 7, 2016	Haleakala	Pan-STARRS 1	·	520 m	MPC · JPL
824014	2016 QC_{61}	—	October 2, 2011	Piszkéstető	K. Sárneczky, Szalai, T.	URS	2.2 km	MPC · JPL
824015	2016 QU_{61}	—	January 2, 2014	Kitt Peak	Spacewatch	·	1.7 km	MPC · JPL
824016	2016 QM_{71}	—	January 23, 2015	Haleakala	Pan-STARRS 1	PHO	780 m	MPC · JPL
824017	2016 QM_{75}	—	March 15, 2015	Haleakala	Pan-STARRS 1	·	2.1 km	MPC · JPL
824018	2016 QW_{76}	—	July 7, 2016	Mount Lemmon	Mount Lemmon Survey	·	1.8 km	MPC · JPL
824019	2016 QQ_{77}	—	October 1, 2005	Mount Lemmon	Mount Lemmon Survey	·	2.0 km	MPC · JPL
824020	2016 QL_{78}	—	November 15, 2007	Mount Lemmon	Mount Lemmon Survey	DOR	1.6 km	MPC · JPL
824021	2016 QG_{80}	—	August 1, 2016	Haleakala	Pan-STARRS 1	(10369)	1.5 km	MPC · JPL
824022	2016 QN_{80}	—	July 23, 2003	Palomar	NEAT	EUN	1.2 km	MPC · JPL
824023	2016 QJ_{83}	—	December 31, 2008	Kitt Peak	Spacewatch	·	1.3 km	MPC · JPL
824024	2016 QP_{83}	—	July 11, 2016	Haleakala	Pan-STARRS 1	PHO	820 m	MPC · JPL
824025	2016 QX_{83}	—	February 16, 2010	Kitt Peak	Spacewatch	H	300 m	MPC · JPL
824026	2016 QU_{85}	—	January 12, 2015	Haleakala	Pan-STARRS 1	H	350 m	MPC · JPL
824027	2016 QV_{86}	—	August 18, 2002	Palomar Mountain	NEAT	DOR	1.6 km	MPC · JPL
824028	2016 QP_{88}	—	August 30, 2016	Haleakala	Pan-STARRS 1	EOS	1.4 km	MPC · JPL
824029	2016 QK_{90}	—	December 19, 2003	Kitt Peak	Spacewatch	·	1.4 km	MPC · JPL
824030	2016 QW_{90}	—	February 2, 2009	Kitt Peak	Spacewatch	EUN	850 m	MPC · JPL
824031	2016 QM_{91}	—	January 19, 2013	Mount Lemmon	Mount Lemmon Survey	·	1.6 km	MPC · JPL
824032	2016 QH_{92}	—	October 24, 2011	Haleakala	Pan-STARRS 1	·	1.7 km	MPC · JPL
824033	2016 QO_{95}	—	August 29, 2016	Mount Lemmon	Mount Lemmon Survey	·	2.1 km	MPC · JPL
824034	2016 QC_{98}	—	August 19, 2016	Haleakala	Pan-STARRS 1	PHO	690 m	MPC · JPL
824035	2016 QM_{99}	—	June 27, 2011	Kitt Peak	Spacewatch	·	1.2 km	MPC · JPL
824036	2016 QQ_{100}	—	August 27, 2016	XuYi	PMO NEO Survey Program	·	1.4 km	MPC · JPL
824037	2016 QG_{102}	—	August 28, 2016	Mount Lemmon	Mount Lemmon Survey	·	1.3 km	MPC · JPL
824038	2016 QZ_{102}	—	August 30, 2016	Mount Lemmon	Mount Lemmon Survey	·	1.1 km	MPC · JPL
824039	2016 QC_{103}	—	August 30, 2016	Mount Lemmon	Mount Lemmon Survey	·	3.0 km	MPC · JPL
824040	2016 QM_{104}	—	August 28, 2016	Mount Lemmon	Mount Lemmon Survey	·	1.4 km	MPC · JPL
824041	2016 QC_{105}	—	August 26, 2016	Haleakala	Pan-STARRS 1	·	1.2 km	MPC · JPL
824042	2016 QG_{106}	—	August 28, 2016	Mount Lemmon	Mount Lemmon Survey	NYS	880 m	MPC · JPL
824043	2016 QL_{106}	—	August 29, 2016	Mount Lemmon	Mount Lemmon Survey	EMA	2.4 km	MPC · JPL
824044	2016 QW_{106}	—	August 29, 2016	Mount Lemmon	Mount Lemmon Survey	·	1.3 km	MPC · JPL
824045	2016 QK_{107}	—	August 29, 2016	Mount Lemmon	Mount Lemmon Survey	·	1.3 km	MPC · JPL
824046	2016 QA_{111}	—	August 29, 2016	Mount Lemmon	Mount Lemmon Survey	·	870 m	MPC · JPL
824047	2016 QN_{115}	—	August 29, 2016	Mount Lemmon	Mount Lemmon Survey	V	490 m	MPC · JPL
824048	2016 QQ_{115}	—	August 24, 2016	Kitt Peak	Spacewatch	NYS	920 m	MPC · JPL
824049	2016 QA_{117}	—	August 28, 2016	Mount Lemmon	Mount Lemmon Survey	EOS	1.1 km	MPC · JPL
824050	2016 QV_{117}	—	August 28, 2016	Mount Lemmon	Mount Lemmon Survey	NYS	860 m	MPC · JPL
824051	2016 QY_{117}	—	August 28, 2016	Mount Lemmon	Mount Lemmon Survey	·	800 m	MPC · JPL
824052	2016 QW_{118}	—	August 28, 2016	Mount Lemmon	Mount Lemmon Survey	·	880 m	MPC · JPL
824053	2016 QZ_{120}	—	August 27, 2016	Haleakala	Pan-STARRS 1	·	530 m	MPC · JPL
824054	2016 QL_{128}	—	August 30, 2016	Mount Lemmon	Mount Lemmon Survey	TEL	1.0 km	MPC · JPL
824055	2016 QR_{128}	—	August 27, 2016	Haleakala	Pan-STARRS 1	·	850 m	MPC · JPL
824056	2016 QH_{132}	—	July 30, 2016	Haleakala	Pan-STARRS 1	·	1.9 km	MPC · JPL
824057	2016 QV_{135}	—	August 28, 2016	Mount Lemmon	Mount Lemmon Survey	·	1.2 km	MPC · JPL
824058	2016 QE_{137}	—	August 28, 2016	Mount Lemmon	Mount Lemmon Survey	·	1.4 km	MPC · JPL
824059	2016 QM_{137}	—	August 27, 2016	Haleakala	Pan-STARRS 1	KOR	1.1 km	MPC · JPL
824060	2016 QW_{137}	—	August 27, 2016	Haleakala	Pan-STARRS 1	·	1.7 km	MPC · JPL
824061	2016 QT_{139}	—	August 17, 2009	La Sagra	OAM	·	730 m	MPC · JPL
824062	2016 QH_{142}	—	August 30, 2016	Haleakala	Pan-STARRS 1	·	1.3 km	MPC · JPL
824063	2016 QW_{150}	—	March 11, 2014	Mount Lemmon	Mount Lemmon Survey	·	1.6 km	MPC · JPL
824064	2016 RT_{2}	—	September 2, 2016	Mount Lemmon	Mount Lemmon Survey	·	1.3 km	MPC · JPL
824065	2016 RC_{3}	—	November 7, 2007	Kitt Peak	Spacewatch	·	680 m	MPC · JPL
824066	2016 RZ_{3}	—	November 8, 2010	Mount Lemmon	Mount Lemmon Survey	·	740 m	MPC · JPL
824067	2016 RC_{4}	—	October 24, 2011	Haleakala	Pan-STARRS 1	LIX	2.4 km	MPC · JPL
824068	2016 RO_{6}	—	July 11, 2016	Haleakala	Pan-STARRS 1	·	580 m	MPC · JPL
824069	2016 RC_{8}	—	October 4, 2007	Mount Lemmon	Mount Lemmon Survey	·	1.7 km	MPC · JPL
824070	2016 RK_{9}	—	February 24, 2015	Haleakala	Pan-STARRS 1	V	450 m	MPC · JPL
824071	2016 RM_{13}	—	July 6, 2016	Haleakala	Pan-STARRS 1	·	1.7 km	MPC · JPL
824072	2016 RL_{25}	—	November 26, 2010	Mount Lemmon	Mount Lemmon Survey	·	620 m	MPC · JPL
824073	2016 RL_{26}	—	November 2, 2013	Mount Lemmon	Mount Lemmon Survey	·	610 m	MPC · JPL
824074	2016 RQ_{27}	—	July 11, 2016	Haleakala	Pan-STARRS 1	EOS	1.4 km	MPC · JPL
824075	2016 RU_{29}	—	September 12, 2005	Kitt Peak	Spacewatch	·	1.9 km	MPC · JPL
824076	2016 RV_{29}	—	October 18, 2011	Kitt Peak	Spacewatch	·	1.6 km	MPC · JPL
824077	2016 RP_{32}	—	September 10, 2007	Kitt Peak	Spacewatch	·	1.4 km	MPC · JPL
824078	2016 RT_{40}	—	May 18, 2012	Mount Lemmon	Mount Lemmon Survey	PHO	800 m	MPC · JPL
824079	2016 RR_{43}	—	September 8, 2016	Haleakala	Pan-STARRS 1	BRA	1.2 km	MPC · JPL
824080	2016 RL_{45}	—	October 3, 2006	Mount Lemmon	Mount Lemmon Survey	·	550 m	MPC · JPL
824081	2016 RS_{48}	—	October 23, 2011	Haleakala	Pan-STARRS 1	·	2.4 km	MPC · JPL
824082	2016 RV_{51}	—	September 5, 2016	Mount Lemmon	Mount Lemmon Survey	·	900 m	MPC · JPL
824083	2016 RD_{52}	—	September 8, 2016	Haleakala	Pan-STARRS 1	·	2.2 km	MPC · JPL
824084	2016 RB_{53}	—	September 6, 2016	Mount Lemmon	Mount Lemmon Survey	·	1.1 km	MPC · JPL
824085	2016 RW_{54}	—	November 29, 2003	Kitt Peak	Spacewatch	·	1.3 km	MPC · JPL
824086	2016 RE_{58}	—	September 4, 2016	Mount Lemmon	Mount Lemmon Survey	H	490 m	MPC · JPL
824087	2016 RG_{59}	—	September 12, 2016	Haleakala	Pan-STARRS 1	·	490 m	MPC · JPL
824088	2016 RU_{60}	—	September 12, 2016	Mount Lemmon	Mount Lemmon Survey	TIN	610 m	MPC · JPL
824089	2016 RH_{61}	—	September 2, 2016	Mount Lemmon	Mount Lemmon Survey	ADE	1.3 km	MPC · JPL
824090	2016 RF_{62}	—	September 5, 2016	Mount Lemmon	Mount Lemmon Survey	·	1.3 km	MPC · JPL
824091	2016 RG_{62}	—	September 8, 2016	Haleakala	Pan-STARRS 1	·	2.2 km	MPC · JPL
824092	2016 RF_{64}	—	September 6, 2016	Mount Lemmon	Mount Lemmon Survey	·	1.0 km	MPC · JPL
824093	2016 RG_{66}	—	September 6, 2016	Mount Lemmon	Mount Lemmon Survey	·	730 m	MPC · JPL
824094	2016 RA_{69}	—	September 8, 2016	Haleakala	Pan-STARRS 1	·	1.8 km	MPC · JPL
824095	2016 RC_{70}	—	September 10, 2016	Kitt Peak	Spacewatch	·	920 m	MPC · JPL
824096	2016 RR_{70}	—	September 12, 2016	Haleakala	Pan-STARRS 1	·	1.1 km	MPC · JPL
824097	2016 RB_{75}	—	September 12, 2016	Haleakala	Pan-STARRS 1	PHO	590 m	MPC · JPL
824098	2016 RG_{76}	—	September 5, 2016	Mount Lemmon	Mount Lemmon Survey	·	560 m	MPC · JPL
824099	2016 RL_{78}	—	September 6, 2016	Mount Lemmon	Mount Lemmon Survey	·	910 m	MPC · JPL
824100	2016 RR_{89}	—	December 23, 2012	Haleakala	Pan-STARRS 1	·	1.4 km	MPC · JPL

== 824101–824200 ==
back to top

Designation			Discovery			Properties		Ref
Permanent	Provisional	Named after	Date	Site	Discoverer(s)	Category	Diam.	Ref
824101	2016 RU_{89}	—	September 12, 2016	Haleakala	Pan-STARRS 1	·	2.3 km	MPC · JPL
824102	2016 SR	—	September 19, 2011	Haleakala	Pan-STARRS 1	H	420 m	MPC · JPL
824103	2016 SK_{3}	—	April 9, 2002	Palomar	NEAT	·	1.7 km	MPC · JPL
824104	2016 SB_{4}	—	August 30, 2016	Haleakala	Pan-STARRS 1	·	1.6 km	MPC · JPL
824105	2016 SE_{4}	—	August 1, 2016	Haleakala	Pan-STARRS 1	·	1.7 km	MPC · JPL
824106	2016 SS_{4}	—	November 8, 2012	Haleakala	Pan-STARRS 1	·	1.4 km	MPC · JPL
824107	2016 SN_{5}	—	October 19, 2012	Mount Lemmon	Mount Lemmon Survey	MAR	700 m	MPC · JPL
824108	2016 SU_{6}	—	September 21, 2016	Cerro Paranal	Gaia Ground Based Optical Tracking	·	460 m	MPC · JPL
824109	2016 SB_{7}	—	November 8, 2008	Mount Lemmon	Mount Lemmon Survey	·	1.4 km	MPC · JPL
824110	2016 SR_{8}	—	December 11, 2012	Nogales	M. Schwartz, P. R. Holvorcem	·	1.8 km	MPC · JPL
824111	2016 SQ_{11}	—	August 2, 2016	Haleakala	Pan-STARRS 1	·	950 m	MPC · JPL
824112	2016 SV_{12}	—	September 15, 1999	Kitt Peak	Spacewatch	·	1.2 km	MPC · JPL
824113	2016 SX_{13}	—	August 7, 2002	Palomar	NEAT	(2076)	580 m	MPC · JPL
824114	2016 SX_{14}	—	October 25, 2013	Mount Lemmon	Mount Lemmon Survey	·	510 m	MPC · JPL
824115	2016 SQ_{19}	—	January 21, 2015	Haleakala	Pan-STARRS 1	H	410 m	MPC · JPL
824116	2016 SW_{19}	—	November 10, 2005	Catalina	CSS	·	1 km	MPC · JPL
824117	2016 SL_{21}	—	October 3, 2006	Mount Lemmon	Mount Lemmon Survey	·	530 m	MPC · JPL
824118	2016 SF_{22}	—	August 31, 2005	Palomar	NEAT	·	980 m	MPC · JPL
824119	2016 SP_{29}	—	December 1, 2005	Mount Lemmon	Mount Lemmon Survey	·	1.8 km	MPC · JPL
824120	2016 SM_{30}	—	August 2, 2016	Haleakala	Pan-STARRS 1	·	870 m	MPC · JPL
824121	2016 SX_{31}	—	May 22, 2015	Haleakala	Pan-STARRS 1	·	1.2 km	MPC · JPL
824122	2016 SJ_{34}	—	August 2, 2016	Haleakala	Pan-STARRS 1	·	730 m	MPC · JPL
824123	2016 SN_{34}	—	August 2, 2016	Haleakala	Pan-STARRS 1	KOR	1.1 km	MPC · JPL
824124	2016 SX_{37}	—	September 18, 2003	Palomar	NEAT	ADE	1.4 km	MPC · JPL
824125	2016 SC_{40}	—	March 17, 2015	Mount Lemmon	Mount Lemmon Survey	·	530 m	MPC · JPL
824126	2016 SS_{40}	—	February 28, 2014	Haleakala	Pan-STARRS 1	PHO	640 m	MPC · JPL
824127	2016 SO_{44}	—	November 9, 2013	Haleakala	Pan-STARRS 1	·	510 m	MPC · JPL
824128	2016 SM_{46}	—	September 22, 2016	Mount Lemmon	Mount Lemmon Survey	·	580 m	MPC · JPL
824129	2016 SX_{46}	—	January 8, 2015	Haleakala	Pan-STARRS 1	H	470 m	MPC · JPL
824130	2016 SW_{47}	—	October 21, 2006	Lulin	LUSS	·	1.6 km	MPC · JPL
824131	2016 SU_{50}	—	September 30, 2016	Haleakala	Pan-STARRS 1	·	800 m	MPC · JPL
824132	2016 SO_{61}	—	April 7, 2014	Mount Lemmon	Mount Lemmon Survey	EOS	1.4 km	MPC · JPL
824133	2016 SE_{64}	—	September 25, 2016	Mount Lemmon	Mount Lemmon Survey	·	2.0 km	MPC · JPL
824134	2016 SG_{65}	—	September 25, 2016	Haleakala	Pan-STARRS 1	EOS	1.2 km	MPC · JPL
824135	2016 SP_{69}	—	September 22, 2016	Mount Lemmon	Mount Lemmon Survey	EUN	860 m	MPC · JPL
824136	2016 SM_{70}	—	September 25, 2016	Haleakala	Pan-STARRS 1	·	2.0 km	MPC · JPL
824137	2016 SA_{72}	—	September 26, 2016	Cerro Paranal	Gaia Ground Based Optical Tracking	·	1.2 km	MPC · JPL
824138	2016 SU_{76}	—	September 25, 2016	Haleakala	Pan-STARRS 1	·	1.7 km	MPC · JPL
824139	2016 SS_{77}	—	August 2, 2016	Haleakala	Pan-STARRS 1	·	1.2 km	MPC · JPL
824140	2016 ST_{77}	—	September 30, 2016	Haleakala	Pan-STARRS 1	·	1.2 km	MPC · JPL
824141	2016 SY_{82}	—	September 27, 2016	Haleakala	Pan-STARRS 1	·	1.7 km	MPC · JPL
824142	2016 SX_{84}	—	September 30, 2016	Haleakala	Pan-STARRS 1	·	1.2 km	MPC · JPL
824143	2016 SV_{90}	—	September 26, 2016	Haleakala	Pan-STARRS 1	·	840 m	MPC · JPL
824144	2016 SF_{96}	—	September 27, 2016	Mount Lemmon	Mount Lemmon Survey	EOS	1.4 km	MPC · JPL
824145	2016 SA_{99}	—	September 30, 2016	Haleakala	Pan-STARRS 1	·	1.6 km	MPC · JPL
824146	2016 SO_{99}	—	September 27, 2016	Haleakala	Pan-STARRS 1	·	2.0 km	MPC · JPL
824147	2016 SH_{101}	—	September 25, 2016	Haleakala	Pan-STARRS 1	·	1.7 km	MPC · JPL
824148	2016 SW_{107}	—	October 23, 2011	Haleakala	Pan-STARRS 1	·	1.5 km	MPC · JPL
824149	2016 SH_{108}	—	September 30, 2016	Haleakala	Pan-STARRS 1	KOR	1.1 km	MPC · JPL
824150	2016 TD_{2}	—	January 12, 2015	Haleakala	Pan-STARRS 1	H	420 m	MPC · JPL
824151	2016 TF_{2}	—	July 14, 2013	Haleakala	Pan-STARRS 1	H	460 m	MPC · JPL
824152	2016 TY_{2}	—	September 20, 2011	Mount Lemmon	Mount Lemmon Survey	H	340 m	MPC · JPL
824153	2016 TJ_{6}	—	October 24, 2007	Mount Lemmon	Mount Lemmon Survey	MRX	1 km	MPC · JPL
824154	2016 TL_{7}	—	November 22, 2006	Kitt Peak	Spacewatch	·	1.9 km	MPC · JPL
824155	2016 TV_{7}	—	October 12, 2009	Mount Lemmon	Mount Lemmon Survey	NYS	800 m	MPC · JPL
824156	2016 TE_{11}	—	October 5, 2016	Mount Lemmon	Mount Lemmon Survey	H	460 m	MPC · JPL
824157	2016 TR_{18}	—	June 18, 2010	Mount Lemmon	Mount Lemmon Survey	H	510 m	MPC · JPL
824158	2016 TA_{21}	—	October 27, 1995	Kitt Peak	Spacewatch	·	540 m	MPC · JPL
824159	2016 TY_{21}	—	July 7, 2016	Mount Lemmon	Mount Lemmon Survey	H	400 m	MPC · JPL
824160	2016 TE_{24}	—	October 4, 2016	Mount Lemmon	Mount Lemmon Survey	·	310 m	MPC · JPL
824161	2016 TT_{27}	—	September 17, 2006	Kitt Peak	Spacewatch	·	1.4 km	MPC · JPL
824162	2016 TF_{29}	—	October 5, 2016	Mount Lemmon	Mount Lemmon Survey	·	1.4 km	MPC · JPL
824163	2016 TK_{29}	—	October 5, 2016	Mount Lemmon	Mount Lemmon Survey	EOS	1.5 km	MPC · JPL
824164	2016 TY_{31}	—	August 27, 2002	Palomar	NEAT	·	1.9 km	MPC · JPL
824165	2016 TH_{32}	—	June 16, 2016	Haleakala	Pan-STARRS 1	·	1.3 km	MPC · JPL
824166	2016 TL_{32}	—	September 10, 2016	Mount Lemmon	Mount Lemmon Survey	·	1.9 km	MPC · JPL
824167	2016 TV_{35}	—	September 6, 2016	Mount Lemmon	Mount Lemmon Survey	TIR	1.8 km	MPC · JPL
824168	2016 TC_{36}	—	August 23, 2011	Haleakala	Pan-STARRS 1	·	1.5 km	MPC · JPL
824169	2016 TC_{37}	—	September 5, 2016	Mount Lemmon	Mount Lemmon Survey	·	1.7 km	MPC · JPL
824170	2016 TG_{41}	—	December 24, 2005	Kitt Peak	Spacewatch	·	750 m	MPC · JPL
824171	2016 TA_{42}	—	February 26, 2014	Mount Lemmon	Mount Lemmon Survey	PHO	740 m	MPC · JPL
824172	2016 TR_{42}	—	September 20, 2011	Mount Lemmon	Mount Lemmon Survey	·	1.3 km	MPC · JPL
824173	2016 TK_{44}	—	October 6, 2016	Haleakala	Pan-STARRS 1	NYS	810 m	MPC · JPL
824174	2016 TN_{46}	—	August 10, 2012	Kitt Peak	Spacewatch	·	850 m	MPC · JPL
824175	2016 TK_{48}	—	September 15, 2006	Kitt Peak	Spacewatch	615	1.1 km	MPC · JPL
824176	2016 TV_{49}	—	September 18, 2011	Mount Lemmon	Mount Lemmon Survey	·	1.4 km	MPC · JPL
824177	2016 TT_{51}	—	September 25, 2016	Haleakala	Pan-STARRS 1	·	1.9 km	MPC · JPL
824178	2016 TW_{53}	—	August 26, 2012	Haleakala	Pan-STARRS 1	·	1.2 km	MPC · JPL
824179	2016 TP_{57}	—	October 18, 2009	Mount Lemmon	Mount Lemmon Survey	PHO	410 m	MPC · JPL
824180	2016 TV_{58}	—	July 30, 2016	Haleakala	Pan-STARRS 1	·	1.2 km	MPC · JPL
824181	2016 TL_{60}	—	September 12, 1994	Kitt Peak	Spacewatch	·	1.0 km	MPC · JPL
824182	2016 TP_{63}	—	November 14, 2012	Kitt Peak	Spacewatch	·	1.0 km	MPC · JPL
824183	2016 TY_{64}	—	July 26, 2011	Haleakala	Pan-STARRS 1	(32418)	1.7 km	MPC · JPL
824184	2016 TV_{67}	—	May 12, 2015	Mount Lemmon	Mount Lemmon Survey	·	1.3 km	MPC · JPL
824185	2016 TU_{68}	—	February 28, 2014	Haleakala	Pan-STARRS 1	·	1.7 km	MPC · JPL
824186	2016 TQ_{73}	—	October 22, 2006	Mount Bigelow	CSS	·	670 m	MPC · JPL
824187	2016 TS_{73}	—	August 27, 2016	Haleakala	Pan-STARRS 1	·	1.7 km	MPC · JPL
824188	2016 TM_{76}	—	September 15, 2012	Mount Lemmon	Mount Lemmon Survey	V	520 m	MPC · JPL
824189	2016 TW_{77}	—	October 10, 2016	Oukaïmeden	C. Rinner	·	720 m	MPC · JPL
824190	2016 TP_{82}	—	November 30, 2008	Kitt Peak	Spacewatch	·	950 m	MPC · JPL
824191	2016 TJ_{85}	—	October 10, 2016	Mount Lemmon	Mount Lemmon Survey	·	1.3 km	MPC · JPL
824192	2016 TX_{85}	—	August 29, 2016	Mount Lemmon	Mount Lemmon Survey	MAS	560 m	MPC · JPL
824193	2016 TW_{86}	—	October 23, 2009	Kitt Peak	Spacewatch	·	660 m	MPC · JPL
824194	2016 TG_{87}	—	September 12, 2007	Catalina	CSS	·	1.4 km	MPC · JPL
824195	2016 TL_{87}	—	August 30, 2016	Mount Lemmon	Mount Lemmon Survey	615	1.1 km	MPC · JPL
824196	2016 TN_{87}	—	November 8, 2007	Kitt Peak	Spacewatch	·	1.5 km	MPC · JPL
824197	2016 TZ_{89}	—	August 26, 2012	Haleakala	Pan-STARRS 1	NYS	860 m	MPC · JPL
824198	2016 TG_{90}	—	August 25, 2012	Kitt Peak	Spacewatch	·	840 m	MPC · JPL
824199	2016 TW_{91}	—	July 3, 2011	Mount Lemmon	Mount Lemmon Survey	·	1.6 km	MPC · JPL
824200	2016 TG_{95}	—	December 1, 2003	Kitt Peak	Spacewatch	H	350 m	MPC · JPL

== 824201–824300 ==
back to top

Designation			Discovery			Properties		Ref
Permanent	Provisional	Named after	Date	Site	Discoverer(s)	Category	Diam.	Ref
824201	2016 TJ_{95}	—	October 2, 2016	Mount Lemmon	Mount Lemmon Survey	H	350 m	MPC · JPL
824202	2016 TJ_{101}	—	October 6, 2016	Mount Lemmon	Mount Lemmon Survey	HNS	980 m	MPC · JPL
824203	2016 TU_{101}	—	October 10, 2016	Oukaïmeden	C. Rinner	·	1.2 km	MPC · JPL
824204	2016 TB_{102}	—	October 1, 2016	Kitt Peak	Spacewatch	·	1.9 km	MPC · JPL
824205	2016 TQ_{102}	—	October 9, 2016	Haleakala	Pan-STARRS 1	·	2.2 km	MPC · JPL
824206	2016 TQ_{104}	—	October 9, 2016	Mount Lemmon	Mount Lemmon Survey	·	2.3 km	MPC · JPL
824207	2016 TR_{105}	—	October 12, 2016	Mount Lemmon	Mount Lemmon Survey	·	1.3 km	MPC · JPL
824208	2016 TD_{107}	—	October 4, 2016	Mount Lemmon	Mount Lemmon Survey	MIS	1.8 km	MPC · JPL
824209	2016 TL_{108}	—	October 12, 2016	Haleakala	Pan-STARRS 1	V	440 m	MPC · JPL
824210	2016 TO_{108}	—	October 17, 2003	Kitt Peak	Spacewatch	·	1.3 km	MPC · JPL
824211	2016 TA_{118}	—	October 8, 2016	Haleakala	Pan-STARRS 1	URS	2.5 km	MPC · JPL
824212	2016 TO_{118}	—	October 13, 2016	Mount Lemmon	Mount Lemmon Survey	H	550 m	MPC · JPL
824213	2016 TT_{120}	—	October 12, 2016	Haleakala	Pan-STARRS 1	3:2	3.1 km	MPC · JPL
824214	2016 TB_{121}	—	October 9, 2016	Haleakala	Pan-STARRS 1	·	1.9 km	MPC · JPL
824215	2016 TG_{121}	—	October 6, 2016	Haleakala	Pan-STARRS 1	·	760 m	MPC · JPL
824216	2016 TE_{122}	—	October 13, 2016	Haleakala	Pan-STARRS 1	H	400 m	MPC · JPL
824217	2016 TJ_{122}	—	November 27, 2006	Mount Lemmon	Mount Lemmon Survey	·	550 m	MPC · JPL
824218	2016 TO_{123}	—	October 4, 2016	Mount Lemmon	Mount Lemmon Survey	·	720 m	MPC · JPL
824219	2016 TO_{124}	—	October 12, 2016	Haleakala	Pan-STARRS 1	H	420 m	MPC · JPL
824220	2016 TZ_{124}	—	October 4, 2016	Mount Lemmon	Mount Lemmon Survey	EOS	1.2 km	MPC · JPL
824221	2016 TJ_{125}	—	October 7, 2016	Mount Lemmon	Mount Lemmon Survey	·	1.8 km	MPC · JPL
824222	2016 TR_{125}	—	October 9, 2016	Mount Lemmon	Mount Lemmon Survey	EOS	1.3 km	MPC · JPL
824223	2016 TJ_{126}	—	October 7, 2016	Haleakala	Pan-STARRS 1	·	1.3 km	MPC · JPL
824224	2016 TC_{130}	—	October 13, 2016	Mount Lemmon	Mount Lemmon Survey	EUN	930 m	MPC · JPL
824225	2016 TO_{131}	—	October 5, 2016	Mount Lemmon	Mount Lemmon Survey	V	510 m	MPC · JPL
824226	2016 TM_{134}	—	October 5, 2016	Mount Lemmon	Mount Lemmon Survey	·	1.7 km	MPC · JPL
824227	2016 TR_{135}	—	October 7, 2016	Haleakala	Pan-STARRS 1	·	2.0 km	MPC · JPL
824228	2016 TX_{139}	—	October 7, 2016	Kitt Peak	Spacewatch	EOS	1.4 km	MPC · JPL
824229	2016 TE_{142}	—	October 8, 2016	Haleakala	Pan-STARRS 1	MAR	650 m	MPC · JPL
824230	2016 TN_{145}	—	June 20, 2015	Haleakala	Pan-STARRS 1	EUN	830 m	MPC · JPL
824231	2016 TG_{149}	—	October 10, 2016	Haleakala	Pan-STARRS 1	·	1.4 km	MPC · JPL
824232	2016 TG_{161}	—	October 2, 2016	Mount Lemmon	Mount Lemmon Survey	V	530 m	MPC · JPL
824233	2016 TF_{163}	—	October 13, 2016	Haleakala	Pan-STARRS 1	H	470 m	MPC · JPL
824234	2016 TQ_{163}	—	October 8, 2016	Haleakala	Pan-STARRS 1	·	880 m	MPC · JPL
824235	2016 TD_{168}	—	October 4, 2016	Mount Lemmon	Mount Lemmon Survey	·	1.7 km	MPC · JPL
824236	2016 TM_{169}	—	October 7, 2016	Mount Lemmon	Mount Lemmon Survey	·	500 m	MPC · JPL
824237	2016 TY_{177}	—	October 9, 2016	Mount Lemmon	Mount Lemmon Survey	·	1.5 km	MPC · JPL
824238	2016 TN_{181}	—	October 12, 2016	Haleakala	Pan-STARRS 1	·	1.7 km	MPC · JPL
824239	2016 TB_{186}	—	October 7, 2016	Mount Lemmon	Mount Lemmon Survey	·	2.7 km	MPC · JPL
824240	2016 TD_{186}	—	October 4, 2016	Mount Lemmon	Mount Lemmon Survey	·	1.4 km	MPC · JPL
824241	2016 TR_{186}	—	October 12, 2016	Haleakala	Pan-STARRS 1	·	1.9 km	MPC · JPL
824242	2016 TL_{190}	—	October 9, 2016	Haleakala	Pan-STARRS 1	·	2.5 km	MPC · JPL
824243	2016 TL_{192}	—	October 13, 2016	Haleakala	Pan-STARRS 1	·	2.4 km	MPC · JPL
824244	2016 TA_{194}	—	October 6, 2016	Haleakala	Pan-STARRS 1	·	1.3 km	MPC · JPL
824245	2016 TH_{196}	—	December 28, 2013	Mount Lemmon	Mount Lemmon Survey	·	660 m	MPC · JPL
824246	2016 TN_{203}	—	October 20, 2006	Mount Lemmon	Mount Lemmon Survey	·	520 m	MPC · JPL
824247	2016 TQ_{203}	—	October 4, 2016	Mount Lemmon	Mount Lemmon Survey	·	730 m	MPC · JPL
824248	2016 TQ_{207}	—	April 19, 2009	Mount Lemmon	Mount Lemmon Survey	·	1.2 km	MPC · JPL
824249	2016 UT	—	October 15, 2012	Haleakala	Pan-STARRS 1	·	750 m	MPC · JPL
824250	2016 UW	—	September 28, 2003	Kitt Peak	Spacewatch	·	1.2 km	MPC · JPL
824251	2016 UA_{1}	—	October 30, 2007	Mount Lemmon	Mount Lemmon Survey	·	1.3 km	MPC · JPL
824252	2016 UW_{1}	—	November 1, 2013	Kitt Peak	Spacewatch	·	630 m	MPC · JPL
824253	2016 UX_{2}	—	October 10, 2016	Mount Lemmon	Mount Lemmon Survey	·	1.7 km	MPC · JPL
824254	2016 UD_{4}	—	March 29, 2011	Mount Lemmon	Mount Lemmon Survey	·	970 m	MPC · JPL
824255	2016 UU_{5}	—	September 24, 2011	Mount Lemmon	Mount Lemmon Survey	H	430 m	MPC · JPL
824256	2016 UC_{9}	—	October 8, 2016	Mount Lemmon	Mount Lemmon Survey	EOS	1.3 km	MPC · JPL
824257	2016 UZ_{9}	—	October 10, 2016	Haleakala	Pan-STARRS 1	·	980 m	MPC · JPL
824258	2016 UC_{12}	—	September 6, 2016	Mount Lemmon	Mount Lemmon Survey	EUN	920 m	MPC · JPL
824259	2016 UE_{13}	—	March 28, 2015	Haleakala	Pan-STARRS 1	·	1.6 km	MPC · JPL
824260	2016 UK_{14}	—	August 11, 2012	Siding Spring	SSS	·	800 m	MPC · JPL
824261	2016 UP_{14}	—	November 3, 2007	Kitt Peak	Spacewatch	·	1.4 km	MPC · JPL
824262	2016 UG_{17}	—	August 27, 2016	Haleakala	Pan-STARRS 1	V	470 m	MPC · JPL
824263	2016 UY_{19}	—	August 14, 2012	Haleakala	Pan-STARRS 1	MAS · fast	590 m	MPC · JPL
824264	2016 UN_{22}	—	October 10, 2016	Mount Lemmon	Mount Lemmon Survey	·	620 m	MPC · JPL
824265	2016 UU_{22}	—	September 19, 2003	Kitt Peak	Spacewatch	(194)	1.1 km	MPC · JPL
824266	2016 UM_{23}	—	June 11, 2015	Haleakala	Pan-STARRS 1	·	930 m	MPC · JPL
824267	2016 UR_{26}	—	August 30, 2016	Mount Lemmon	Mount Lemmon Survey	·	1.5 km	MPC · JPL
824268	2016 UV_{30}	—	November 18, 2009	Kitt Peak	Spacewatch	·	700 m	MPC · JPL
824269	2016 UT_{31}	—	September 3, 2016	Mount Lemmon	Mount Lemmon Survey	·	990 m	MPC · JPL
824270	2016 UW_{31}	—	February 9, 2014	Haleakala	Pan-STARRS 1	·	810 m	MPC · JPL
824271	2016 UR_{32}	—	October 2, 2016	Mount Lemmon	Mount Lemmon Survey	TIN	830 m	MPC · JPL
824272	2016 UW_{32}	—	December 30, 2008	Mount Lemmon	Mount Lemmon Survey	·	1.1 km	MPC · JPL
824273	2016 UZ_{33}	—	October 1, 2005	Mount Lemmon	Mount Lemmon Survey	PHO	760 m	MPC · JPL
824274	2016 UL_{34}	—	October 10, 2016	Mount Lemmon	Mount Lemmon Survey	·	530 m	MPC · JPL
824275	2016 UF_{36}	—	October 7, 2016	Haleakala	Pan-STARRS 1	·	490 m	MPC · JPL
824276	2016 UQ_{37}	—	October 11, 2007	Kitt Peak	Spacewatch	·	1.3 km	MPC · JPL
824277	2016 UD_{38}	—	October 2, 2016	Mount Lemmon	Mount Lemmon Survey	EOS	1.3 km	MPC · JPL
824278	2016 UK_{38}	—	September 20, 2003	Palomar	NEAT	·	1.4 km	MPC · JPL
824279	2016 UQ_{38}	—	September 25, 2016	Mount Lemmon	Mount Lemmon Survey	·	1.6 km	MPC · JPL
824280	2016 UG_{43}	—	October 24, 2016	Mount Lemmon	Mount Lemmon Survey	·	890 m	MPC · JPL
824281	2016 US_{46}	—	August 16, 2009	Kitt Peak	Spacewatch	·	600 m	MPC · JPL
824282	2016 UK_{47}	—	September 24, 2007	Kitt Peak	Spacewatch	·	1.5 km	MPC · JPL
824283	2016 UO_{49}	—	September 22, 2012	Mount Lemmon	Mount Lemmon Survey	·	960 m	MPC · JPL
824284	2016 UW_{51}	—	October 13, 2016	Haleakala	Pan-STARRS 1	·	1 km	MPC · JPL
824285	2016 UC_{53}	—	November 22, 2005	Kitt Peak	Spacewatch	MAS	600 m	MPC · JPL
824286	2016 UG_{53}	—	October 1, 2005	Mount Lemmon	Mount Lemmon Survey	THM	1.7 km	MPC · JPL
824287	2016 UX_{55}	—	September 22, 2008	Kitt Peak	Spacewatch	·	1.2 km	MPC · JPL
824288	2016 UG_{58}	—	October 20, 2016	Mount Lemmon	Mount Lemmon Survey	·	1.5 km	MPC · JPL
824289	2016 UL_{62}	—	August 1, 2011	Haleakala	Pan-STARRS 1	·	1.7 km	MPC · JPL
824290	2016 UX_{69}	—	October 21, 2016	Mount Lemmon	Mount Lemmon Survey	·	1.3 km	MPC · JPL
824291	2016 UT_{70}	—	October 12, 2016	Mount Lemmon	Mount Lemmon Survey	·	1.3 km	MPC · JPL
824292	2016 UP_{73}	—	October 26, 2011	Haleakala	Pan-STARRS 1	·	1.8 km	MPC · JPL
824293	2016 UZ_{73}	—	January 9, 2013	Kitt Peak	Spacewatch	·	1.3 km	MPC · JPL
824294	2016 UM_{75}	—	August 10, 2016	Haleakala	Pan-STARRS 1	·	930 m	MPC · JPL
824295	2016 UT_{75}	—	October 26, 2016	Kitt Peak	Spacewatch	·	550 m	MPC · JPL
824296	2016 UM_{78}	—	April 1, 2008	Kitt Peak	Spacewatch	·	750 m	MPC · JPL
824297	2016 UZ_{80}	—	September 29, 2005	Kitt Peak	Spacewatch	·	770 m	MPC · JPL
824298	2016 UL_{81}	—	September 30, 2016	Haleakala	Pan-STARRS 1	·	1.3 km	MPC · JPL
824299	2016 UD_{84}	—	October 1, 2005	Kitt Peak	Spacewatch	·	1.8 km	MPC · JPL
824300	2016 UA_{86}	—	October 12, 2016	Mount Lemmon	Mount Lemmon Survey	·	480 m	MPC · JPL

== 824301–824400 ==
back to top

Designation			Discovery			Properties		Ref
Permanent	Provisional	Named after	Date	Site	Discoverer(s)	Category	Diam.	Ref
824301	2016 UN_{86}	—	September 19, 2009	Kitt Peak	Spacewatch	·	610 m	MPC · JPL
824302	2016 UY_{88}	—	April 19, 2015	Mount Lemmon	Mount Lemmon Survey	V	500 m	MPC · JPL
824303	2016 UH_{99}	—	February 5, 2011	Haleakala	Pan-STARRS 1	·	870 m	MPC · JPL
824304	2016 UW_{101}	—	September 25, 2009	Mount Lemmon	Mount Lemmon Survey	·	500 m	MPC · JPL
824305	2016 UY_{103}	—	May 2, 2014	Mount Lemmon	Mount Lemmon Survey	·	1.9 km	MPC · JPL
824306	2016 UQ_{107}	—	October 18, 2009	Mount Lemmon	Mount Lemmon Survey	·	790 m	MPC · JPL
824307	2016 UW_{107}	—	November 24, 2008	Mount Lemmon	Mount Lemmon Survey	HNS	740 m	MPC · JPL
824308	2016 UP_{112}	—	February 23, 2007	Kitt Peak	Spacewatch	·	590 m	MPC · JPL
824309	2016 UN_{114}	—	October 19, 2011	Mount Lemmon	Mount Lemmon Survey	KOR	1.1 km	MPC · JPL
824310	2016 UR_{116}	—	April 5, 2014	Haleakala	Pan-STARRS 1	·	1.2 km	MPC · JPL
824311	2016 UH_{119}	—	October 10, 2007	Kitt Peak	Spacewatch	·	1.2 km	MPC · JPL
824312	2016 UB_{120}	—	October 24, 2003	Kitt Peak	Deep Ecliptic Survey	·	1.1 km	MPC · JPL
824313	2016 UY_{122}	—	November 4, 2007	Kitt Peak	Spacewatch	HOF	1.7 km	MPC · JPL
824314	2016 UB_{123}	—	October 27, 2005	Mount Lemmon	Mount Lemmon Survey	·	940 m	MPC · JPL
824315	2016 UJ_{124}	—	December 2, 2005	Mount Lemmon	Mount Lemmon Survey	NYS	920 m	MPC · JPL
824316	2016 UA_{135}	—	March 29, 2014	Mount Lemmon	Mount Lemmon Survey	·	810 m	MPC · JPL
824317	2016 UA_{138}	—	October 27, 2016	Mount Lemmon	Mount Lemmon Survey	·	770 m	MPC · JPL
824318	2016 UU_{142}	—	October 30, 2016	Kitt Peak	Spacewatch	·	490 m	MPC · JPL
824319	2016 UB_{143}	—	November 25, 2010	Mount Lemmon	Mount Lemmon Survey	·	740 m	MPC · JPL
824320	2016 UA_{144}	—	July 2, 2011	Kitt Peak	Spacewatch	·	1.4 km	MPC · JPL
824321	2016 UW_{144}	—	August 25, 2009	La Sagra	OAM	·	570 m	MPC · JPL
824322	2016 UE_{147}	—	October 12, 2016	Mount Lemmon	Mount Lemmon Survey	T_{j} (2.93)	2.6 km	MPC · JPL
824323	2016 UT_{147}	—	November 13, 2002	Palomar	NEAT	·	1.7 km	MPC · JPL
824324	2016 UJ_{149}	—	October 2, 2008	Kitt Peak	Spacewatch	·	840 m	MPC · JPL
824325	2016 UG_{150}	—	October 20, 2016	Mount Lemmon	Mount Lemmon Survey	·	1.5 km	MPC · JPL
824326	2016 UR_{150}	—	October 24, 2016	Mount Lemmon	Mount Lemmon Survey	·	1.2 km	MPC · JPL
824327	2016 UB_{154}	—	September 13, 2012	Mount Lemmon	Mount Lemmon Survey	·	800 m	MPC · JPL
824328	2016 UT_{200}	—	June 15, 2015	Haleakala	Pan-STARRS 1	·	1.4 km	MPC · JPL
824329	2016 US_{212}	—	February 28, 2014	Haleakala	Pan-STARRS 1	·	1.1 km	MPC · JPL
824330	2016 UF_{214}	—	January 23, 2014	Mount Lemmon	Mount Lemmon Survey	MAS	460 m	MPC · JPL
824331	2016 UR_{219}	—	September 6, 2019	Haleakala	Pan-STARRS 1	·	450 m	MPC · JPL
824332	2016 UX_{226}	—	December 25, 2013	Mount Lemmon	Mount Lemmon Survey	·	380 m	MPC · JPL
824333	2016 UF_{231}	—	June 5, 2014	Haleakala	Pan-STARRS 1	·	1.9 km	MPC · JPL
824334	2016 UA_{236}	—	October 30, 2011	Mount Lemmon	Mount Lemmon Survey	·	1.1 km	MPC · JPL
824335	2016 UT_{239}	—	February 13, 2007	Mount Lemmon	Mount Lemmon Survey	·	620 m	MPC · JPL
824336	2016 UV_{242}	—	October 27, 2016	Haleakala	Pan-STARRS 1	·	990 m	MPC · JPL
824337	2016 UL_{247}	—	October 19, 2016	Mount Lemmon	Mount Lemmon Survey	·	1.7 km	MPC · JPL
824338	2016 UH_{248}	—	October 19, 2016	Mount Lemmon	Mount Lemmon Survey	·	1.1 km	MPC · JPL
824339	2016 UQ_{248}	—	May 22, 2006	Mount Lemmon	Mount Lemmon Survey	TIN	590 m	MPC · JPL
824340	2016 UM_{250}	—	October 22, 2016	Mount Lemmon	Mount Lemmon Survey	·	1.0 km	MPC · JPL
824341	2016 UN_{250}	—	October 23, 2016	Mount Lemmon	Mount Lemmon Survey	MAR	850 m	MPC · JPL
824342	2016 UA_{253}	—	October 21, 2016	Mount Lemmon	Mount Lemmon Survey	·	450 m	MPC · JPL
824343	2016 UG_{253}	—	October 21, 2016	Mount Lemmon	Mount Lemmon Survey	·	990 m	MPC · JPL
824344	2016 US_{253}	—	October 24, 2016	Mount Lemmon	Mount Lemmon Survey	EUN	880 m	MPC · JPL
824345	2016 UP_{260}	—	October 23, 2016	Mount Lemmon	Mount Lemmon Survey	·	1.1 km	MPC · JPL
824346	2016 UH_{261}	—	October 27, 2016	Mount Lemmon	Mount Lemmon Survey	·	1.0 km	MPC · JPL
824347	2016 UW_{262}	—	October 25, 2016	Haleakala	Pan-STARRS 1	V	450 m	MPC · JPL
824348	2016 UY_{262}	—	October 20, 2016	Mount Lemmon	Mount Lemmon Survey	·	570 m	MPC · JPL
824349	2016 UZ_{262}	—	October 29, 2016	Mount Lemmon	Mount Lemmon Survey	MAR	700 m	MPC · JPL
824350	2016 UM_{268}	—	October 21, 2016	Mount Lemmon	Mount Lemmon Survey	615	1.1 km	MPC · JPL
824351	2016 UR_{271}	—	October 30, 2016	Mount Lemmon	Mount Lemmon Survey	·	2.2 km	MPC · JPL
824352	2016 UT_{274}	—	October 21, 2016	Mount Lemmon	Mount Lemmon Survey	·	620 m	MPC · JPL
824353	2016 UP_{275}	—	October 21, 2016	Mount Lemmon	Mount Lemmon Survey	·	1.5 km	MPC · JPL
824354	2016 UX_{275}	—	October 24, 2016	Mount Lemmon	Mount Lemmon Survey	·	1.5 km	MPC · JPL
824355	2016 US_{277}	—	October 21, 2016	Mount Lemmon	Mount Lemmon Survey	·	1.5 km	MPC · JPL
824356	2016 UB_{278}	—	October 26, 2016	Mount Lemmon	Mount Lemmon Survey	·	1.4 km	MPC · JPL
824357	2016 US_{278}	—	October 20, 2016	Mount Lemmon	Mount Lemmon Survey	·	2.1 km	MPC · JPL
824358	2016 UA_{288}	—	October 19, 2016	Mount Lemmon	Mount Lemmon Survey	V	470 m	MPC · JPL
824359	2016 UX_{288}	—	October 19, 2016	Mount Lemmon	Mount Lemmon Survey	V	480 m	MPC · JPL
824360	2016 UW_{301}	—	October 28, 2016	Haleakala	Pan-STARRS 1	·	780 m	MPC · JPL
824361	2016 VS_{4}	—	August 8, 2015	WISE	WISE	·	2.5 km	MPC · JPL
824362	2016 VE_{7}	—	September 19, 2006	Kitt Peak	Spacewatch	·	400 m	MPC · JPL
824363	2016 VY_{10}	—	October 27, 2011	Mount Lemmon	Mount Lemmon Survey	·	1.7 km	MPC · JPL
824364	2016 VY_{11}	—	October 26, 2016	Mount Lemmon	Mount Lemmon Survey	MAS	500 m	MPC · JPL
824365	2016 VC_{12}	—	November 30, 2008	Mount Lemmon	Mount Lemmon Survey	H	470 m	MPC · JPL
824366	2016 VM_{12}	—	November 4, 2005	Kitt Peak	Spacewatch	NYS	820 m	MPC · JPL
824367	2016 VV_{13}	—	October 26, 2011	Haleakala	Pan-STARRS 1	EOS	1.3 km	MPC · JPL
824368	2016 VE_{14}	—	October 7, 2016	Mount Lemmon	Mount Lemmon Survey	·	1.5 km	MPC · JPL
824369	2016 VJ_{15}	—	January 19, 2012	Mount Lemmon	Mount Lemmon Survey	·	2.0 km	MPC · JPL
824370	2016 VY_{16}	—	November 19, 2008	Kitt Peak	Spacewatch	MAR	630 m	MPC · JPL
824371	2016 VW_{19}	—	October 23, 2011	Haleakala	Pan-STARRS 1	·	1.6 km	MPC · JPL
824372	2016 VL_{21}	—	February 15, 2012	Haleakala	Pan-STARRS 1	·	2.0 km	MPC · JPL
824373	2016 VG_{22}	—	November 6, 2016	Haleakala	Pan-STARRS 1	·	3.1 km	MPC · JPL
824374	2016 VU_{22}	—	March 19, 2001	Sacramento Peak	SDSS	·	1.7 km	MPC · JPL
824375	2016 VN_{28}	—	November 8, 2016	Mount Lemmon	Mount Lemmon Survey	·	1.1 km	MPC · JPL
824376	2016 VZ_{28}	—	November 10, 2016	Mount Lemmon	Mount Lemmon Survey	H	370 m	MPC · JPL
824377	2016 VS_{29}	—	November 11, 2016	Mount Lemmon	Mount Lemmon Survey	·	1.5 km	MPC · JPL
824378	2016 VL_{32}	—	November 10, 2016	Mount Lemmon	Mount Lemmon Survey	·	1.0 km	MPC · JPL
824379	2016 VX_{32}	—	November 4, 2016	Haleakala	Pan-STARRS 1	·	1.5 km	MPC · JPL
824380	2016 VP_{37}	—	November 6, 2016	Mount Lemmon	Mount Lemmon Survey	·	920 m	MPC · JPL
824381	2016 VP_{39}	—	November 6, 2016	Haleakala	Pan-STARRS 1	·	1.6 km	MPC · JPL
824382	2016 VL_{43}	—	November 6, 2016	Mount Lemmon	Mount Lemmon Survey	·	700 m	MPC · JPL
824383	2016 VM_{44}	—	October 21, 2012	Haleakala	Pan-STARRS 1	V	520 m	MPC · JPL
824384	2016 VZ_{44}	—	November 6, 2016	Mount Lemmon	Mount Lemmon Survey	·	820 m	MPC · JPL
824385	2016 VB_{46}	—	November 4, 2016	Haleakala	Pan-STARRS 1	·	900 m	MPC · JPL
824386	2016 VL_{46}	—	September 7, 2008	Catalina	CSS	·	1.2 km	MPC · JPL
824387	2016 VP_{48}	—	November 6, 2016	Mount Lemmon	Mount Lemmon Survey	·	2.3 km	MPC · JPL
824388	2016 VR_{55}	—	November 5, 2016	Haleakala	Pan-STARRS 1	·	2.1 km	MPC · JPL
824389	2016 VD_{56}	—	November 1, 2016	Haleakala	Pan-STARRS 1	·	2.6 km	MPC · JPL
824390	2016 VN_{57}	—	November 8, 2016	Haleakala	Pan-STARRS 1	H	440 m	MPC · JPL
824391	2016 VX_{57}	—	December 28, 2011	Mount Lemmon	Mount Lemmon Survey	·	2.3 km	MPC · JPL
824392	2016 VG_{62}	—	November 7, 2016	Mount Lemmon	Mount Lemmon Survey	·	920 m	MPC · JPL
824393	2016 VE_{66}	—	November 7, 2016	Mount Lemmon	Mount Lemmon Survey	·	550 m	MPC · JPL
824394	2016 WJ_{3}	—	November 9, 2016	Mount Lemmon	Mount Lemmon Survey	H	480 m	MPC · JPL
824395	2016 WO_{5}	—	October 1, 2005	Kitt Peak	Spacewatch	·	1.7 km	MPC · JPL
824396	2016 WF_{15}	—	October 25, 2016	Haleakala	Pan-STARRS 1	NYS	720 m	MPC · JPL
824397	2016 WW_{17}	—	October 26, 2016	Mount Lemmon	Mount Lemmon Survey	·	750 m	MPC · JPL
824398	2016 WB_{18}	—	March 5, 2014	Haleakala	Pan-STARRS 1	NYS	670 m	MPC · JPL
824399	2016 WY_{18}	—	April 14, 2010	Mount Lemmon	Mount Lemmon Survey	H	380 m	MPC · JPL
824400	2016 WE_{19}	—	October 23, 2016	Mount Lemmon	Mount Lemmon Survey	(1547)	1.1 km	MPC · JPL

== 824401–824500 ==
back to top

Designation			Discovery			Properties		Ref
Permanent	Provisional	Named after	Date	Site	Discoverer(s)	Category	Diam.	Ref
824401	2016 WT_{19}	—	September 20, 2011	Haleakala	Pan-STARRS 1	·	1.8 km	MPC · JPL
824402	2016 WB_{26}	—	October 26, 2016	Haleakala	Pan-STARRS 1	·	820 m	MPC · JPL
824403	2016 WN_{27}	—	February 25, 2014	Kitt Peak	Spacewatch	V	520 m	MPC · JPL
824404	2016 WQ_{28}	—	February 9, 2013	Haleakala	Pan-STARRS 1	·	1.7 km	MPC · JPL
824405	2016 WU_{28}	—	October 28, 2016	Haleakala	Pan-STARRS 1	V	490 m	MPC · JPL
824406	2016 WU_{31}	—	September 1, 2010	Mount Lemmon	Mount Lemmon Survey	·	2.3 km	MPC · JPL
824407	2016 WK_{32}	—	September 20, 2011	Mount Lemmon	Mount Lemmon Survey	·	1.6 km	MPC · JPL
824408	2016 WH_{35}	—	November 24, 2016	Haleakala	Pan-STARRS 1	H	470 m	MPC · JPL
824409	2016 WU_{35}	—	October 29, 2016	Mount Lemmon	Mount Lemmon Survey	HNS	930 m	MPC · JPL
824410	2016 WG_{36}	—	September 2, 2016	Mount Lemmon	Mount Lemmon Survey	·	710 m	MPC · JPL
824411	2016 WU_{36}	—	November 4, 2016	Haleakala	Pan-STARRS 1	DOR	1.8 km	MPC · JPL
824412	2016 WE_{37}	—	August 29, 2008	La Sagra	OAM	NYS	990 m	MPC · JPL
824413	2016 WL_{37}	—	October 26, 2016	Haleakala	Pan-STARRS 1	MAR	1.0 km	MPC · JPL
824414	2016 WX_{37}	—	November 20, 2009	Kitt Peak	Spacewatch	·	610 m	MPC · JPL
824415	2016 WH_{39}	—	February 10, 2014	Haleakala	Pan-STARRS 1	·	930 m	MPC · JPL
824416	2016 WH_{40}	—	October 23, 2009	Mount Lemmon	Mount Lemmon Survey	V	460 m	MPC · JPL
824417	2016 WP_{41}	—	September 20, 2012	Tincana	Zolnowski, M., Kusiak, M.	·	1.0 km	MPC · JPL
824418	2016 WB_{42}	—	November 4, 2016	Haleakala	Pan-STARRS 1	·	1.1 km	MPC · JPL
824419	2016 WD_{50}	—	August 17, 2012	Haleakala	Pan-STARRS 1	·	640 m	MPC · JPL
824420	2016 WA_{52}	—	April 2, 2005	Mount Lemmon	Mount Lemmon Survey	H	370 m	MPC · JPL
824421	2016 WB_{52}	—	December 29, 2011	Mount Lemmon	Mount Lemmon Survey	EOS	1.7 km	MPC · JPL
824422	2016 WA_{56}	—	September 22, 2003	Kitt Peak	Spacewatch	·	440 m	MPC · JPL
824423	2016 WH_{56}	—	January 1, 2014	Mount Lemmon	Mount Lemmon Survey	·	700 m	MPC · JPL
824424	2016 WZ_{58}	—	November 23, 2016	Mount Lemmon	Mount Lemmon Survey	GEF	970 m	MPC · JPL
824425	2016 WB_{60}	—	November 20, 2016	Mount Lemmon	Mount Lemmon Survey	·	600 m	MPC · JPL
824426	2016 WG_{60}	—	November 25, 2016	Mount Lemmon	Mount Lemmon Survey	(194)	1.5 km	MPC · JPL
824427	2016 WP_{60}	—	November 23, 2016	Mount Lemmon	Mount Lemmon Survey	V	470 m	MPC · JPL
824428	2016 WX_{60}	—	November 20, 2016	Mount Lemmon	Mount Lemmon Survey	·	830 m	MPC · JPL
824429	2016 WJ_{61}	—	November 28, 2016	Haleakala	Pan-STARRS 1	·	1.5 km	MPC · JPL
824430	2016 WU_{61}	—	November 26, 2016	Haleakala	Pan-STARRS 1	·	770 m	MPC · JPL
824431	2016 WV_{61}	—	November 18, 2016	Mount Lemmon	Mount Lemmon Survey	VER	2.0 km	MPC · JPL
824432	2016 WC_{63}	—	November 23, 2016	Mount Lemmon	Mount Lemmon Survey	·	1.6 km	MPC · JPL
824433	2016 WK_{64}	—	November 19, 2016	Mount Lemmon	Mount Lemmon Survey	·	1.1 km	MPC · JPL
824434	2016 WB_{67}	—	November 19, 2016	Mount Lemmon	Mount Lemmon Survey	·	1.4 km	MPC · JPL
824435	2016 WA_{68}	—	November 19, 2016	Mount Lemmon	Mount Lemmon Survey	·	760 m	MPC · JPL
824436	2016 WM_{68}	—	November 25, 2016	Mount Lemmon	Mount Lemmon Survey	(5)	1.1 km	MPC · JPL
824437	2016 WO_{68}	—	November 25, 2016	Mount Lemmon	Mount Lemmon Survey	·	990 m	MPC · JPL
824438	2016 WU_{69}	—	November 23, 2016	Mount Lemmon	Mount Lemmon Survey	·	930 m	MPC · JPL
824439	2016 WF_{70}	—	November 23, 2016	Mount Lemmon	Mount Lemmon Survey	·	660 m	MPC · JPL
824440	2016 WT_{72}	—	November 23, 2016	Mount Lemmon	Mount Lemmon Survey	·	760 m	MPC · JPL
824441	2016 WW_{73}	—	November 25, 2016	Mount Lemmon	Mount Lemmon Survey	·	880 m	MPC · JPL
824442	2016 WD_{75}	—	November 18, 2016	Mount Lemmon	Mount Lemmon Survey	·	2.2 km	MPC · JPL
824443	2016 WF_{76}	—	November 25, 2016	Mount Lemmon	Mount Lemmon Survey	VER	1.9 km	MPC · JPL
824444	2016 XW_{2}	—	December 26, 2011	Mount Lemmon	Mount Lemmon Survey	·	2.4 km	MPC · JPL
824445	2016 XY_{6}	—	October 24, 2016	Mount Lemmon	Mount Lemmon Survey	·	1.7 km	MPC · JPL
824446	2016 XF_{13}	—	October 29, 2005	Catalina	CSS	H	370 m	MPC · JPL
824447	2016 XX_{13}	—	June 11, 2015	Haleakala	Pan-STARRS 1	EUN	1.1 km	MPC · JPL
824448	2016 XY_{18}	—	November 4, 2016	Haleakala	Pan-STARRS 1	·	500 m	MPC · JPL
824449	2016 XQ_{20}	—	November 9, 2016	Mount Lemmon	Mount Lemmon Survey	·	1.5 km	MPC · JPL
824450	2016 XY_{20}	—	November 25, 2016	Kitt Peak	Spacewatch	·	2.3 km	MPC · JPL
824451	2016 XQ_{25}	—	December 3, 2016	Mount Lemmon	Mount Lemmon Survey	·	3.7 km	MPC · JPL
824452	2016 XR_{25}	—	December 8, 2016	Mount Lemmon	Mount Lemmon Survey	·	510 m	MPC · JPL
824453	2016 XT_{25}	—	December 9, 2016	Mount Lemmon	Mount Lemmon Survey	·	490 m	MPC · JPL
824454	2016 XV_{25}	—	December 1, 2016	Mount Lemmon	Mount Lemmon Survey	V	580 m	MPC · JPL
824455	2016 XH_{26}	—	December 5, 2016	Mount Lemmon	Mount Lemmon Survey	·	860 m	MPC · JPL
824456	2016 XN_{26}	—	December 4, 2016	Kitt Peak	Spacewatch	·	970 m	MPC · JPL
824457	2016 XY_{26}	—	December 5, 2016	Mount Lemmon	Mount Lemmon Survey	H	290 m	MPC · JPL
824458	2016 XP_{30}	—	December 1, 2016	Mount Lemmon	Mount Lemmon Survey	·	1.2 km	MPC · JPL
824459	2016 XP_{34}	—	December 1, 2016	Mount Lemmon	Mount Lemmon Survey	·	1.7 km	MPC · JPL
824460	2016 XK_{36}	—	November 18, 2006	Mount Lemmon	Mount Lemmon Survey	H	370 m	MPC · JPL
824461	2016 YF_{1}	—	March 30, 2015	Haleakala	Pan-STARRS 1	H	320 m	MPC · JPL
824462	2016 YE_{4}	—	November 26, 2011	Haleakala	Pan-STARRS 1	H	320 m	MPC · JPL
824463	2016 YR_{4}	—	November 6, 2016	Mount Lemmon	Mount Lemmon Survey	H	500 m	MPC · JPL
824464	2016 YW_{4}	—	November 20, 2016	Mount Lemmon	Mount Lemmon Survey	·	990 m	MPC · JPL
824465	2016 YF_{6}	—	October 9, 2007	Catalina	CSS	·	1.3 km	MPC · JPL
824466	2016 YL_{11}	—	December 27, 2006	Mount Lemmon	Mount Lemmon Survey	·	1.9 km	MPC · JPL
824467	2016 YO_{11}	—	October 5, 2012	Haleakala	Pan-STARRS 1	·	860 m	MPC · JPL
824468	2016 YQ_{12}	—	December 18, 2003	Kitt Peak	Spacewatch	JUN	660 m	MPC · JPL
824469	2016 YR_{14}	—	December 22, 2016	Haleakala	Pan-STARRS 1	H	390 m	MPC · JPL
824470	2016 YU_{17}	—	December 24, 2016	Mount Lemmon	Mount Lemmon Survey	·	710 m	MPC · JPL
824471	2016 YK_{18}	—	December 26, 2016	Calar Alto	S. Hellmich, S. Mottola	·	840 m	MPC · JPL
824472	2016 YD_{27}	—	April 29, 2014	Haleakala	Pan-STARRS 1	·	700 m	MPC · JPL
824473	2016 YE_{27}	—	December 27, 2016	Mount Lemmon	Mount Lemmon Survey	·	800 m	MPC · JPL
824474	2016 YL_{28}	—	December 23, 2016	Haleakala	Pan-STARRS 1	·	750 m	MPC · JPL
824475	2016 YD_{32}	—	December 22, 2016	Haleakala	Pan-STARRS 1	H	430 m	MPC · JPL
824476	2017 AR_{1}	—	July 26, 2015	Haleakala	Pan-STARRS 1	·	1.6 km	MPC · JPL
824477	2017 AO_{3}	—	December 28, 2011	Mount Lemmon	Mount Lemmon Survey	H	350 m	MPC · JPL
824478	2017 AB_{10}	—	September 23, 2015	Haleakala	Pan-STARRS 1	TIR	2.2 km	MPC · JPL
824479	2017 AB_{13}	—	December 24, 2011	Mount Lemmon	Mount Lemmon Survey	H	450 m	MPC · JPL
824480	2017 AV_{20}	—	October 5, 2013	Haleakala	Pan-STARRS 1	H	350 m	MPC · JPL
824481	2017 AN_{23}	—	December 8, 2015	Mount Lemmon	Mount Lemmon Survey	·	2.7 km	MPC · JPL
824482	2017 AM_{24}	—	November 18, 2015	Haleakala	Pan-STARRS 1	·	2.3 km	MPC · JPL
824483	2017 AS_{24}	—	March 23, 2012	Mount Lemmon	Mount Lemmon Survey	·	2.3 km	MPC · JPL
824484	2017 AC_{27}	—	June 15, 2015	Haleakala	Pan-STARRS 1	H	330 m	MPC · JPL
824485	2017 AT_{27}	—	January 2, 2017	Haleakala	Pan-STARRS 1	H	390 m	MPC · JPL
824486	2017 AJ_{29}	—	January 4, 2017	Haleakala	Pan-STARRS 1	EUN	890 m	MPC · JPL
824487	2017 AR_{30}	—	January 3, 2017	Haleakala	Pan-STARRS 1	PHO	750 m	MPC · JPL
824488	2017 AT_{34}	—	January 7, 2017	Mount Lemmon	Mount Lemmon Survey	H	320 m	MPC · JPL
824489	2017 AX_{34}	—	January 4, 2017	Haleakala	Pan-STARRS 1	H	370 m	MPC · JPL
824490	2017 AZ_{35}	—	January 3, 2017	Haleakala	Pan-STARRS 1	·	1.6 km	MPC · JPL
824491	2017 AN_{42}	—	January 5, 2017	Mount Lemmon	Mount Lemmon Survey	PHO	820 m	MPC · JPL
824492	2017 AD_{45}	—	January 7, 2017	Mount Lemmon	Mount Lemmon Survey	NYS	760 m	MPC · JPL
824493	2017 AH_{48}	—	January 4, 2017	Haleakala	Pan-STARRS 1	·	1.1 km	MPC · JPL
824494	2017 AA_{49}	—	January 5, 2017	Mount Lemmon	Mount Lemmon Survey	·	2.5 km	MPC · JPL
824495	2017 AT_{51}	—	January 3, 2017	Haleakala	Pan-STARRS 1	H	420 m	MPC · JPL
824496	2017 AO_{53}	—	October 15, 2007	Mount Lemmon	Mount Lemmon Survey	·	940 m	MPC · JPL
824497	2017 AR_{56}	—	January 4, 2017	Haleakala	Pan-STARRS 1	L5	7.8 km	MPC · JPL
824498	2017 BP	—	May 20, 2015	Haleakala	Pan-STARRS 1	H	430 m	MPC · JPL
824499	2017 BM_{2}	—	January 20, 2017	Haleakala	Pan-STARRS 1	H	450 m	MPC · JPL
824500	2017 BM_{5}	—	May 9, 2007	Mount Lemmon	Mount Lemmon Survey	·	330 m	MPC · JPL

== 824501–824600 ==
back to top

Designation			Discovery			Properties		Ref
Permanent	Provisional	Named after	Date	Site	Discoverer(s)	Category	Diam.	Ref
824501	2017 BV_{7}	—	March 12, 2013	Siding Spring	SSS	·	1.3 km	MPC · JPL
824502	2017 BN_{8}	—	March 6, 2013	Haleakala	Pan-STARRS 1	·	1.2 km	MPC · JPL
824503	2017 BZ_{10}	—	November 17, 2008	Kitt Peak	Spacewatch	MAS	630 m	MPC · JPL
824504	2017 BW_{12}	—	June 9, 2014	Mount Lemmon	Mount Lemmon Survey	·	3.8 km	MPC · JPL
824505	2017 BE_{14}	—	December 8, 2016	Mount Lemmon	Mount Lemmon Survey	H	440 m	MPC · JPL
824506	2017 BE_{15}	—	January 26, 2017	Mount Lemmon	Mount Lemmon Survey	·	2.6 km	MPC · JPL
824507	2017 BS_{17}	—	January 4, 2013	Kitt Peak	Spacewatch	·	970 m	MPC · JPL
824508	2017 BT_{19}	—	January 26, 2017	Mount Lemmon	Mount Lemmon Survey	·	480 m	MPC · JPL
824509	2017 BB_{21}	—	August 14, 2015	Haleakala	Pan-STARRS 1	·	1.0 km	MPC · JPL
824510	2017 BG_{22}	—	January 26, 2017	Haleakala	Pan-STARRS 1	·	740 m	MPC · JPL
824511	2017 BN_{23}	—	May 3, 2008	Mount Lemmon	Mount Lemmon Survey	·	440 m	MPC · JPL
824512	2017 BO_{29}	—	May 9, 2014	Haleakala	Pan-STARRS 1	·	1.9 km	MPC · JPL
824513	2017 BS_{29}	—	January 27, 2017	Mount Lemmon	Mount Lemmon Survey	H	370 m	MPC · JPL
824514	2017 BS_{30}	—	January 28, 2017	Mount Lemmon	Mount Lemmon Survey	H	370 m	MPC · JPL
824515	2017 BB_{33}	—	January 27, 2017	Haleakala	Pan-STARRS 1	H	310 m	MPC · JPL
824516	2017 BQ_{33}	—	February 1, 2012	Kitt Peak	Spacewatch	·	2.2 km	MPC · JPL
824517	2017 BT_{33}	—	June 30, 2014	Haleakala	Pan-STARRS 1	ADE	1.4 km	MPC · JPL
824518	2017 BC_{35}	—	June 6, 2014	Haleakala	Pan-STARRS 1	BAR	1.1 km	MPC · JPL
824519	2017 BY_{36}	—	January 7, 2017	Mount Lemmon	Mount Lemmon Survey	·	1.1 km	MPC · JPL
824520	2017 BK_{37}	—	December 2, 2008	Kitt Peak	Spacewatch	·	940 m	MPC · JPL
824521	2017 BJ_{38}	—	February 15, 2013	Haleakala	Pan-STARRS 1	·	1.2 km	MPC · JPL
824522	2017 BV_{38}	—	December 12, 2006	Mount Lemmon	Mount Lemmon Survey	·	1.4 km	MPC · JPL
824523	2017 BQ_{41}	—	November 20, 2004	Kitt Peak	Spacewatch	·	980 m	MPC · JPL
824524	2017 BF_{42}	—	April 24, 2014	Catalina	CSS	·	760 m	MPC · JPL
824525	2017 BH_{45}	—	November 10, 2016	Haleakala	Pan-STARRS 1	·	1.9 km	MPC · JPL
824526	2017 BF_{46}	—	November 10, 2016	Haleakala	Pan-STARRS 1	·	2.9 km	MPC · JPL
824527	2017 BO_{49}	—	December 5, 2008	Kitt Peak	Spacewatch	·	990 m	MPC · JPL
824528	2017 BE_{50}	—	January 13, 2013	Mount Lemmon	Mount Lemmon Survey	·	940 m	MPC · JPL
824529	2017 BG_{51}	—	January 26, 2017	Mount Lemmon	Mount Lemmon Survey	MAS	590 m	MPC · JPL
824530	2017 BV_{52}	—	July 26, 2014	Haleakala	Pan-STARRS 1	·	1.2 km	MPC · JPL
824531	2017 BY_{52}	—	January 26, 2017	Mount Lemmon	Mount Lemmon Survey	·	720 m	MPC · JPL
824532	2017 BW_{54}	—	February 18, 2013	Kitt Peak	Spacewatch	·	840 m	MPC · JPL
824533	2017 BT_{56}	—	February 15, 2012	Haleakala	Pan-STARRS 1	·	1.7 km	MPC · JPL
824534	2017 BD_{57}	—	January 23, 2006	Mount Lemmon	Mount Lemmon Survey	·	820 m	MPC · JPL
824535	2017 BX_{57}	—	January 26, 2017	Haleakala	Pan-STARRS 1	·	1.0 km	MPC · JPL
824536	2017 BX_{61}	—	November 14, 2010	Mount Lemmon	Mount Lemmon Survey	LIX	2.8 km	MPC · JPL
824537	2017 BP_{62}	—	October 26, 2011	Haleakala	Pan-STARRS 1	·	1.8 km	MPC · JPL
824538	2017 BY_{64}	—	January 19, 2017	Mount Lemmon	Mount Lemmon Survey	·	1.1 km	MPC · JPL
824539	2017 BZ_{66}	—	April 15, 2007	Kitt Peak	Spacewatch	·	1.8 km	MPC · JPL
824540	2017 BA_{69}	—	September 25, 2006	Kitt Peak	Spacewatch	·	1.7 km	MPC · JPL
824541	2017 BJ_{72}	—	August 12, 2015	Haleakala	Pan-STARRS 1	·	2.0 km	MPC · JPL
824542	2017 BH_{73}	—	May 5, 2010	Mount Lemmon	Mount Lemmon Survey	·	1.0 km	MPC · JPL
824543	2017 BH_{74}	—	November 10, 2016	Haleakala	Pan-STARRS 1	·	1.4 km	MPC · JPL
824544	2017 BR_{77}	—	January 27, 2017	Haleakala	Pan-STARRS 1	SUL	1.3 km	MPC · JPL
824545	2017 BG_{78}	—	January 27, 2017	Haleakala	Pan-STARRS 1	·	1.5 km	MPC · JPL
824546	2017 BC_{81}	—	March 18, 2010	Mount Lemmon	Mount Lemmon Survey	NYS	720 m	MPC · JPL
824547	2017 BF_{82}	—	January 30, 2006	Kitt Peak	Spacewatch	NYS	760 m	MPC · JPL
824548	2017 BD_{84}	—	July 3, 2014	Haleakala	Pan-STARRS 1	·	2.5 km	MPC · JPL
824549	2017 BH_{89}	—	September 12, 2015	Haleakala	Pan-STARRS 1	·	1.1 km	MPC · JPL
824550	2017 BA_{91}	—	December 8, 2016	Mount Lemmon	Mount Lemmon Survey	H	370 m	MPC · JPL
824551	2017 BX_{92}	—	December 11, 2013	Haleakala	Pan-STARRS 1	H	390 m	MPC · JPL
824552	2017 BN_{94}	—	May 4, 2014	Haleakala	Pan-STARRS 1	V	390 m	MPC · JPL
824553	2017 BQ_{94}	—	August 26, 2001	Kitt Peak	Spacewatch	·	680 m	MPC · JPL
824554	2017 BV_{98}	—	May 6, 2010	Kitt Peak	Spacewatch	·	1.6 km	MPC · JPL
824555	2017 BS_{102}	—	March 27, 2012	Mount Lemmon	Mount Lemmon Survey	LIX	2.8 km	MPC · JPL
824556	2017 BW_{104}	—	April 17, 2013	Elena Remote	Oreshko, A.	·	1.6 km	MPC · JPL
824557	2017 BY_{107}	—	January 28, 2006	Mount Lemmon	Mount Lemmon Survey	·	2.7 km	MPC · JPL
824558	2017 BJ_{108}	—	June 27, 2015	Haleakala	Pan-STARRS 1	H	390 m	MPC · JPL
824559	2017 BC_{111}	—	May 19, 2010	Mount Lemmon	Mount Lemmon Survey	·	1.1 km	MPC · JPL
824560	2017 BD_{112}	—	December 22, 2012	Haleakala	Pan-STARRS 1	·	880 m	MPC · JPL
824561	2017 BU_{112}	—	February 27, 2012	Kitt Peak	Spacewatch	·	2.5 km	MPC · JPL
824562	2017 BX_{112}	—	January 27, 2017	Mount Lemmon	Mount Lemmon Survey	·	1.3 km	MPC · JPL
824563	2017 BD_{113}	—	November 7, 2015	Mount Lemmon	Mount Lemmon Survey	·	2.3 km	MPC · JPL
824564	2017 BT_{113}	—	March 15, 2012	Kitt Peak	Spacewatch	THB	2.3 km	MPC · JPL
824565	2017 BZ_{127}	—	August 24, 2011	Haleakala	Pan-STARRS 1	·	960 m	MPC · JPL
824566	2017 BZ_{129}	—	January 18, 2008	Mount Lemmon	Mount Lemmon Survey	·	1.4 km	MPC · JPL
824567	2017 BB_{131}	—	July 1, 2014	Haleakala	Pan-STARRS 1	EOS	1.5 km	MPC · JPL
824568	2017 BM_{135}	—	January 31, 2017	Haleakala	Pan-STARRS 1	·	640 m	MPC · JPL
824569	2017 BR_{135}	—	September 28, 2001	Palomar	NEAT	·	1.6 km	MPC · JPL
824570	2017 BR_{138}	—	February 9, 2011	Mount Lemmon	Mount Lemmon Survey	EOS	1.8 km	MPC · JPL
824571	2017 BY_{140}	—	July 31, 2014	Haleakala	Pan-STARRS 1	·	2.6 km	MPC · JPL
824572	2017 BH_{141}	—	December 25, 2011	Kitt Peak	Spacewatch	·	1.2 km	MPC · JPL
824573	2017 BF_{142}	—	January 28, 2017	Haleakala	Pan-STARRS 1	H	420 m	MPC · JPL
824574	2017 BX_{142}	—	January 28, 2017	Mount Lemmon	Mount Lemmon Survey	H	410 m	MPC · JPL
824575	2017 BB_{143}	—	January 28, 2017	Haleakala	Pan-STARRS 1	H	320 m	MPC · JPL
824576	2017 BN_{143}	—	January 30, 2017	Haleakala	Pan-STARRS 1	H	400 m	MPC · JPL
824577	2017 BE_{147}	—	January 20, 2017	Haleakala	Pan-STARRS 1	H	350 m	MPC · JPL
824578	2017 BE_{149}	—	January 29, 2017	Haleakala	Pan-STARRS 1	H	320 m	MPC · JPL
824579	2017 BJ_{149}	—	January 28, 2017	Mount Lemmon	Mount Lemmon Survey	·	1.5 km	MPC · JPL
824580	2017 BD_{151}	—	January 20, 2017	Haleakala	Pan-STARRS 1	H	410 m	MPC · JPL
824581	2017 BV_{155}	—	January 28, 2017	Haleakala	Pan-STARRS 1	EUN	840 m	MPC · JPL
824582	2017 BE_{157}	—	January 28, 2017	Mount Lemmon	Mount Lemmon Survey	·	1.8 km	MPC · JPL
824583	2017 BS_{157}	—	January 28, 2017	Haleakala	Pan-STARRS 1	·	1.1 km	MPC · JPL
824584	2017 BB_{159}	—	January 29, 2017	Haleakala	Pan-STARRS 1	L5	7.5 km	MPC · JPL
824585	2017 BK_{159}	—	January 30, 2017	Mount Lemmon	Mount Lemmon Survey	H	320 m	MPC · JPL
824586	2017 BL_{160}	—	January 27, 2017	Mount Lemmon	Mount Lemmon Survey	·	1.3 km	MPC · JPL
824587	2017 BW_{162}	—	January 28, 2017	Haleakala	Pan-STARRS 1	·	890 m	MPC · JPL
824588	2017 BU_{163}	—	January 26, 2017	Mount Lemmon	Mount Lemmon Survey	·	2.0 km	MPC · JPL
824589	2017 BD_{164}	—	January 31, 2017	Haleakala	Pan-STARRS 1	NYS	810 m	MPC · JPL
824590	2017 BF_{164}	—	January 28, 2017	Haleakala	Pan-STARRS 1	(1118)	2.5 km	MPC · JPL
824591	2017 BQ_{164}	—	January 30, 2017	Haleakala	Pan-STARRS 1	·	2.7 km	MPC · JPL
824592	2017 BA_{170}	—	January 28, 2017	Haleakala	Pan-STARRS 1	·	1.4 km	MPC · JPL
824593	2017 BF_{178}	—	January 27, 2017	Haleakala	Pan-STARRS 1	·	820 m	MPC · JPL
824594	2017 BD_{179}	—	January 26, 2017	Mount Lemmon	Mount Lemmon Survey	·	890 m	MPC · JPL
824595	2017 BE_{179}	—	January 31, 2017	Mount Lemmon	Mount Lemmon Survey	·	820 m	MPC · JPL
824596	2017 BN_{179}	—	January 26, 2017	Mount Lemmon	Mount Lemmon Survey	·	850 m	MPC · JPL
824597	2017 BQ_{179}	—	January 31, 2017	Mount Lemmon	Mount Lemmon Survey	·	730 m	MPC · JPL
824598	2017 BS_{179}	—	January 26, 2017	Mount Lemmon	Mount Lemmon Survey	·	830 m	MPC · JPL
824599	2017 BB_{180}	—	January 29, 2017	Haleakala	Pan-STARRS 1	·	580 m	MPC · JPL
824600	2017 BH_{180}	—	January 27, 2017	Haleakala	Pan-STARRS 1	MAS	590 m	MPC · JPL

== 824601–824700 ==
back to top

Designation			Discovery			Properties		Ref
Permanent	Provisional	Named after	Date	Site	Discoverer(s)	Category	Diam.	Ref
824601	2017 BL_{182}	—	January 3, 2017	Haleakala	Pan-STARRS 1	·	780 m	MPC · JPL
824602	2017 BX_{182}	—	January 28, 2017	Haleakala	Pan-STARRS 1	·	1.3 km	MPC · JPL
824603	2017 BJ_{183}	—	January 28, 2017	Haleakala	Pan-STARRS 1	·	840 m	MPC · JPL
824604	2017 BQ_{191}	—	January 27, 2017	Haleakala	Pan-STARRS 1	PHO	680 m	MPC · JPL
824605	2017 BP_{199}	—	January 29, 2017	Haleakala	Pan-STARRS 1	H	280 m	MPC · JPL
824606	2017 BV_{208}	—	November 29, 2018	Mount Lemmon	Mount Lemmon Survey	H	490 m	MPC · JPL
824607	2017 BK_{221}	—	January 26, 2017	Mount Lemmon	Mount Lemmon Survey	MAS	550 m	MPC · JPL
824608	2017 CK_{3}	—	January 23, 2006	Kitt Peak	Spacewatch	TIR	2.1 km	MPC · JPL
824609	2017 CM_{5}	—	June 9, 2015	Haleakala	Pan-STARRS 1	H	390 m	MPC · JPL
824610	2017 CZ_{7}	—	January 27, 2017	Haleakala	Pan-STARRS 1	MAS	430 m	MPC · JPL
824611	2017 CH_{9}	—	January 27, 2017	Haleakala	Pan-STARRS 1	·	710 m	MPC · JPL
824612	2017 CM_{13}	—	November 7, 2005	Mauna Kea	A. Boattini	NYS	940 m	MPC · JPL
824613	2017 CT_{13}	—	January 27, 2017	Haleakala	Pan-STARRS 1	·	1.0 km	MPC · JPL
824614	2017 CZ_{14}	—	January 26, 2017	Mount Lemmon	Mount Lemmon Survey	·	2.4 km	MPC · JPL
824615	2017 CB_{15}	—	November 1, 2015	Haleakala	Pan-STARRS 1	·	1.3 km	MPC · JPL
824616	2017 CC_{17}	—	January 28, 2017	Haleakala	Pan-STARRS 1	·	860 m	MPC · JPL
824617	2017 CW_{17}	—	October 24, 2011	Haleakala	Pan-STARRS 1	·	980 m	MPC · JPL
824618	2017 CU_{27}	—	April 11, 2010	Kitt Peak	Spacewatch	MAS	520 m	MPC · JPL
824619	2017 CG_{28}	—	October 9, 2015	Haleakala	Pan-STARRS 1	·	980 m	MPC · JPL
824620	2017 CX_{29}	—	September 23, 2015	Haleakala	Pan-STARRS 1	·	870 m	MPC · JPL
824621	2017 CH_{32}	—	October 22, 2008	Kitt Peak	Spacewatch	H	430 m	MPC · JPL
824622	2017 CK_{32}	—	February 14, 2017	Haleakala	Pan-STARRS 1	H	450 m	MPC · JPL
824623	2017 CN_{35}	—	February 8, 2013	Haleakala	Pan-STARRS 1	·	1.1 km	MPC · JPL
824624	2017 CZ_{36}	—	February 2, 2017	Haleakala	Pan-STARRS 1	TIR	2.3 km	MPC · JPL
824625	2017 CW_{38}	—	February 1, 2017	Haleakala	Pan-STARRS 1	H	410 m	MPC · JPL
824626	2017 CX_{39}	—	November 11, 2009	Mount Lemmon	Mount Lemmon Survey	EUP	3.1 km	MPC · JPL
824627	2017 CF_{41}	—	February 4, 2017	Haleakala	Pan-STARRS 1	·	840 m	MPC · JPL
824628	2017 CL_{43}	—	February 14, 2017	Haleakala	Pan-STARRS 1	·	930 m	MPC · JPL
824629	2017 CN_{45}	—	February 1, 2017	Mount Lemmon	Mount Lemmon Survey	JUN	910 m	MPC · JPL
824630	2017 CR_{48}	—	April 9, 2010	Mount Lemmon	Mount Lemmon Survey	·	950 m	MPC · JPL
824631	2017 CX_{48}	—	February 3, 2017	Mount Lemmon	Mount Lemmon Survey	·	760 m	MPC · JPL
824632	2017 DW	—	February 29, 2000	Socorro	LINEAR	T_{j} (2.99)	2.9 km	MPC · JPL
824633	2017 DE_{1}	—	February 4, 2006	Socorro	LINEAR	·	2.1 km	MPC · JPL
824634	2017 DW_{2}	—	January 8, 2011	Mount Lemmon	Mount Lemmon Survey	·	2.2 km	MPC · JPL
824635	2017 DP_{3}	—	January 26, 2017	Mount Lemmon	Mount Lemmon Survey	NYS	930 m	MPC · JPL
824636	2017 DQ_{5}	—	October 19, 2006	Kitt Peak	Deep Ecliptic Survey	·	970 m	MPC · JPL
824637	2017 DL_{10}	—	February 4, 2005	Kitt Peak	Spacewatch	·	820 m	MPC · JPL
824638	2017 DZ_{11}	—	November 26, 2005	Kitt Peak	Spacewatch	·	1.5 km	MPC · JPL
824639	2017 DS_{20}	—	January 18, 2013	Mount Lemmon	Mount Lemmon Survey	·	930 m	MPC · JPL
824640	2017 DA_{22}	—	July 27, 2014	Haleakala	Pan-STARRS 1	·	700 m	MPC · JPL
824641	2017 DM_{30}	—	September 9, 2015	Haleakala	Pan-STARRS 1	EUN	790 m	MPC · JPL
824642	2017 DL_{31}	—	February 21, 2012	Mount Lemmon	Mount Lemmon Survey	·	2.9 km	MPC · JPL
824643	2017 DY_{36}	—	January 8, 2017	Mount Lemmon	Mount Lemmon Survey	H	340 m	MPC · JPL
824644	2017 DF_{42}	—	February 18, 2017	Haleakala	Pan-STARRS 1	NYS	630 m	MPC · JPL
824645	2017 DN_{44}	—	February 25, 2012	Catalina	CSS	·	1.4 km	MPC · JPL
824646	2017 DF_{46}	—	January 4, 2017	Mount Lemmon	Mount Lemmon Survey	H	430 m	MPC · JPL
824647	2017 DG_{49}	—	April 1, 2012	Haleakala	Pan-STARRS 1	·	2.0 km	MPC · JPL
824648	2017 DY_{49}	—	February 21, 2017	Mount Lemmon	Mount Lemmon Survey	·	940 m	MPC · JPL
824649	2017 DA_{51}	—	January 23, 2006	Kitt Peak	Spacewatch	·	2.0 km	MPC · JPL
824650	2017 DF_{57}	—	October 10, 2015	Haleakala	Pan-STARRS 1	·	2.0 km	MPC · JPL
824651	2017 DY_{62}	—	February 25, 2012	Mount Lemmon	Mount Lemmon Survey	·	1.3 km	MPC · JPL
824652	2017 DB_{69}	—	January 8, 2011	Mount Lemmon	Mount Lemmon Survey	·	2.5 km	MPC · JPL
824653	2017 DG_{70}	—	February 3, 2013	Haleakala	Pan-STARRS 1	NYS	790 m	MPC · JPL
824654	2017 DP_{70}	—	September 11, 2015	Haleakala	Pan-STARRS 1	·	670 m	MPC · JPL
824655 Funes	2017 DG_{71}	Funes	November 24, 2012	Mount Graham	K. Černis, R. P. Boyle	NYS	810 m	MPC · JPL
824656	2017 DM_{71}	—	February 21, 2017	Haleakala	Pan-STARRS 1	NYS	790 m	MPC · JPL
824657	2017 DK_{73}	—	February 25, 2012	Catalina	CSS	H	420 m	MPC · JPL
824658	2017 DZ_{78}	—	January 5, 2012	Haleakala	Pan-STARRS 1	·	2.0 km	MPC · JPL
824659	2017 DX_{80}	—	April 27, 2012	Mount Lemmon	Mount Lemmon Survey	·	1.7 km	MPC · JPL
824660	2017 DR_{85}	—	December 18, 2007	Mount Lemmon	Mount Lemmon Survey	·	1.2 km	MPC · JPL
824661	2017 DL_{88}	—	February 22, 2017	Haleakala	Pan-STARRS 1	·	900 m	MPC · JPL
824662	2017 DR_{88}	—	November 15, 2010	Mount Lemmon	Mount Lemmon Survey	·	2.3 km	MPC · JPL
824663	2017 DS_{89}	—	January 27, 2012	Mount Lemmon	Mount Lemmon Survey	H	310 m	MPC · JPL
824664	2017 DM_{90}	—	January 30, 2017	Haleakala	Pan-STARRS 1	·	1.1 km	MPC · JPL
824665	2017 DS_{91}	—	July 7, 2014	Haleakala	Pan-STARRS 1	·	1.6 km	MPC · JPL
824666	2017 DU_{91}	—	January 19, 2009	Mount Lemmon	Mount Lemmon Survey	H	320 m	MPC · JPL
824667	2017 DX_{95}	—	August 12, 2013	Kitt Peak	Spacewatch	·	2.4 km	MPC · JPL
824668	2017 DH_{103}	—	September 12, 2015	Haleakala	Pan-STARRS 1	HNS	750 m	MPC · JPL
824669	2017 DQ_{104}	—	December 11, 2010	Kitt Peak	Spacewatch	·	2.0 km	MPC · JPL
824670	2017 DP_{108}	—	January 3, 2017	Haleakala	Pan-STARRS 1	·	760 m	MPC · JPL
824671	2017 DR_{112}	—	April 30, 2008	Mount Lemmon	Mount Lemmon Survey	·	1.3 km	MPC · JPL
824672	2017 DS_{116}	—	April 15, 2012	Haleakala	Pan-STARRS 1	·	2.0 km	MPC · JPL
824673	2017 DS_{117}	—	June 12, 2012	Mount Lemmon	Mount Lemmon Survey	THB	2.5 km	MPC · JPL
824674	2017 DJ_{118}	—	July 25, 2015	Haleakala	Pan-STARRS 1	·	2.5 km	MPC · JPL
824675	2017 DU_{118}	—	February 26, 2012	Haleakala	Pan-STARRS 1	H	360 m	MPC · JPL
824676	2017 DV_{122}	—	December 9, 2015	Mount Lemmon	Mount Lemmon Survey	·	1.0 km	MPC · JPL
824677	2017 DJ_{127}	—	February 22, 2017	Mount Lemmon	Mount Lemmon Survey	·	950 m	MPC · JPL
824678	2017 DU_{130}	—	February 21, 2017	Haleakala	Pan-STARRS 1	H	380 m	MPC · JPL
824679	2017 DW_{131}	—	February 16, 2017	Mount Lemmon	Mount Lemmon Survey	H	440 m	MPC · JPL
824680	2017 DD_{132}	—	May 1, 2012	Kitt Peak	Spacewatch	·	2.7 km	MPC · JPL
824681	2017 DL_{134}	—	February 25, 2017	Haleakala	Pan-STARRS 1	·	2.6 km	MPC · JPL
824682	2017 DN_{136}	—	February 21, 2017	Haleakala	Pan-STARRS 1	H	310 m	MPC · JPL
824683	2017 DP_{138}	—	February 22, 2017	Haleakala	Pan-STARRS 1	·	710 m	MPC · JPL
824684	2017 DE_{139}	—	February 21, 2017	Mount Lemmon	Mount Lemmon Survey	PHO	590 m	MPC · JPL
824685	2017 DF_{139}	—	February 22, 2017	Mount Lemmon	Mount Lemmon Survey	·	790 m	MPC · JPL
824686	2017 EQ	—	January 4, 2017	Haleakala	Pan-STARRS 1	H	440 m	MPC · JPL
824687	2017 EX	—	March 2, 2017	Mount Lemmon	Mount Lemmon Survey	H	390 m	MPC · JPL
824688	2017 ER_{1}	—	April 2, 2012	Haleakala	Pan-STARRS 1	H	400 m	MPC · JPL
824689	2017 EB_{2}	—	June 12, 2015	Haleakala	Pan-STARRS 1	H	360 m	MPC · JPL
824690	2017 EL_{2}	—	March 4, 2017	Haleakala	Pan-STARRS 1	H	390 m	MPC · JPL
824691	2017 EM_{3}	—	July 9, 2015	Haleakala	Pan-STARRS 1	H	410 m	MPC · JPL
824692	2017 EV_{3}	—	March 7, 2017	Mount Lemmon	Mount Lemmon Survey	H	370 m	MPC · JPL
824693	2017 EM_{6}	—	January 30, 2008	Mount Lemmon	Mount Lemmon Survey	·	1.2 km	MPC · JPL
824694	2017 EW_{6}	—	November 6, 2015	Mount Lemmon	Mount Lemmon Survey	·	2.4 km	MPC · JPL
824695	2017 EM_{8}	—	May 29, 2012	Kitt Peak	Spacewatch	·	1.9 km	MPC · JPL
824696	2017 EK_{9}	—	April 1, 2009	Kitt Peak	Spacewatch	·	770 m	MPC · JPL
824697	2017 EX_{10}	—	January 3, 2017	Haleakala	Pan-STARRS 1	·	1.5 km	MPC · JPL
824698	2017 EX_{15}	—	January 26, 2011	Mount Lemmon	Mount Lemmon Survey	EUP	2.1 km	MPC · JPL
824699	2017 EE_{17}	—	November 18, 2015	Haleakala	Pan-STARRS 1	·	1.9 km	MPC · JPL
824700	2017 EM_{17}	—	August 9, 2015	Haleakala	Pan-STARRS 2	H	450 m	MPC · JPL

== 824701–824800 ==
back to top

Designation			Discovery			Properties		Ref
Permanent	Provisional	Named after	Date	Site	Discoverer(s)	Category	Diam.	Ref
824701	2017 EY_{17}	—	April 14, 2007	Kitt Peak	Spacewatch	·	1.4 km	MPC · JPL
824702	2017 EL_{20}	—	February 2, 2017	Haleakala	Pan-STARRS 1	H	350 m	MPC · JPL
824703	2017 EF_{21}	—	March 15, 2012	Kitt Peak	Spacewatch	H	380 m	MPC · JPL
824704	2017 EQ_{26}	—	March 5, 2017	Haleakala	Pan-STARRS 1	·	2.6 km	MPC · JPL
824705	2017 EW_{28}	—	March 5, 2017	Haleakala	Pan-STARRS 1	·	1.1 km	MPC · JPL
824706	2017 EZ_{29}	—	March 4, 2017	Haleakala	Pan-STARRS 1	·	890 m	MPC · JPL
824707	2017 EV_{30}	—	March 4, 2017	Haleakala	Pan-STARRS 1	PHO	680 m	MPC · JPL
824708	2017 EB_{31}	—	March 5, 2017	Haleakala	Pan-STARRS 1	H	380 m	MPC · JPL
824709	2017 EU_{31}	—	March 7, 2017	Haleakala	Pan-STARRS 1	·	2.2 km	MPC · JPL
824710	2017 EG_{34}	—	March 4, 2017	Haleakala	Pan-STARRS 1	·	770 m	MPC · JPL
824711	2017 EJ_{35}	—	March 2, 2017	Mount Lemmon	Mount Lemmon Survey	·	2.4 km	MPC · JPL
824712	2017 ET_{37}	—	March 7, 2017	Haleakala	Pan-STARRS 1	·	970 m	MPC · JPL
824713	2017 EA_{40}	—	March 2, 2017	Mount Lemmon	Mount Lemmon Survey	H	360 m	MPC · JPL
824714	2017 EK_{40}	—	March 7, 2017	Haleakala	Pan-STARRS 1	·	560 m	MPC · JPL
824715	2017 EY_{40}	—	March 7, 2017	Haleakala	Pan-STARRS 1	EMA	2.1 km	MPC · JPL
824716	2017 EH_{42}	—	March 5, 2017	Haleakala	Pan-STARRS 1	H	300 m	MPC · JPL
824717	2017 EQ_{42}	—	March 8, 2017	Mount Lemmon	Mount Lemmon Survey	H	390 m	MPC · JPL
824718	2017 FB_{2}	—	March 19, 2017	Mount Lemmon	Mount Lemmon Survey	H	340 m	MPC · JPL
824719	2017 FE_{2}	—	July 25, 2015	Haleakala	Pan-STARRS 1	·	720 m	MPC · JPL
824720	2017 FH_{6}	—	January 30, 2017	Haleakala	Pan-STARRS 1	·	1.1 km	MPC · JPL
824721	2017 FF_{7}	—	April 14, 2012	Haleakala	Pan-STARRS 1	·	1.5 km	MPC · JPL
824722	2017 FX_{7}	—	April 30, 2006	Kitt Peak	Spacewatch	NYS	770 m	MPC · JPL
824723	2017 FO_{9}	—	February 22, 2017	Mount Lemmon	Mount Lemmon Survey	·	1.5 km	MPC · JPL
824724	2017 FA_{11}	—	January 26, 2011	Mount Lemmon	Mount Lemmon Survey	ELF	2.5 km	MPC · JPL
824725	2017 FX_{14}	—	January 22, 2013	Mount Lemmon	Mount Lemmon Survey	·	1.0 km	MPC · JPL
824726	2017 FL_{22}	—	September 18, 2011	Mount Lemmon	Mount Lemmon Survey	·	520 m	MPC · JPL
824727	2017 FO_{28}	—	January 10, 2011	Mount Lemmon	Mount Lemmon Survey	·	1.7 km	MPC · JPL
824728	2017 FA_{30}	—	May 19, 2006	Mount Lemmon	Mount Lemmon Survey	·	770 m	MPC · JPL
824729	2017 FZ_{38}	—	January 26, 2017	Haleakala	Pan-STARRS 1	H	330 m	MPC · JPL
824730	2017 FO_{40}	—	April 19, 2012	Mount Lemmon	Mount Lemmon Survey	·	2.0 km	MPC · JPL
824731	2017 FZ_{44}	—	April 23, 2014	Haleakala	Pan-STARRS 1	·	530 m	MPC · JPL
824732	2017 FO_{56}	—	January 25, 2009	Kitt Peak	Spacewatch	·	700 m	MPC · JPL
824733	2017 FZ_{56}	—	February 4, 2017	Haleakala	Pan-STARRS 1	V	560 m	MPC · JPL
824734	2017 FZ_{62}	—	April 25, 2012	Mount Lemmon	Mount Lemmon Survey	H	300 m	MPC · JPL
824735	2017 FP_{66}	—	August 22, 2014	Haleakala	Pan-STARRS 1	URS	2.6 km	MPC · JPL
824736	2017 FP_{69}	—	January 2, 2017	Haleakala	Pan-STARRS 1	·	1.4 km	MPC · JPL
824737	2017 FD_{70}	—	August 3, 2014	Haleakala	Pan-STARRS 1	·	970 m	MPC · JPL
824738	2017 FO_{75}	—	February 1, 2006	Kitt Peak	Spacewatch	·	1.9 km	MPC · JPL
824739	2017 FQ_{80}	—	October 14, 2015	Mount Lemmon	Mount Lemmon Survey	·	1.2 km	MPC · JPL
824740	2017 FX_{82}	—	February 25, 2012	Mount Lemmon	Mount Lemmon Survey	·	1.7 km	MPC · JPL
824741	2017 FD_{89}	—	February 16, 2012	Haleakala	Pan-STARRS 1	(32418)	1.7 km	MPC · JPL
824742	2017 FG_{89}	—	September 30, 2003	Kitt Peak	Spacewatch	·	2.7 km	MPC · JPL
824743	2017 FK_{89}	—	February 21, 2017	Mount Lemmon	Mount Lemmon Survey	·	1.8 km	MPC · JPL
824744	2017 FV_{89}	—	June 29, 2015	Haleakala	Pan-STARRS 1	H	390 m	MPC · JPL
824745	2017 FT_{91}	—	March 8, 2013	Haleakala	Pan-STARRS 1	·	1.2 km	MPC · JPL
824746	2017 FQ_{94}	—	July 2, 2011	Mount Lemmon	Mount Lemmon Survey	·	540 m	MPC · JPL
824747	2017 FZ_{95}	—	March 21, 2017	Haleakala	Pan-STARRS 1	·	2.3 km	MPC · JPL
824748	2017 FX_{96}	—	September 17, 2010	Mount Lemmon	Mount Lemmon Survey	H	370 m	MPC · JPL
824749	2017 FP_{107}	—	February 23, 2017	Mount Lemmon	Mount Lemmon Survey	·	1.3 km	MPC · JPL
824750	2017 FH_{112}	—	February 20, 2006	Catalina	CSS	·	2.7 km	MPC · JPL
824751	2017 FR_{119}	—	February 23, 2012	Mount Lemmon	Mount Lemmon Survey	·	2.3 km	MPC · JPL
824752	2017 FS_{126}	—	November 22, 2015	Mount Lemmon	Mount Lemmon Survey	·	2.1 km	MPC · JPL
824753	2017 FG_{137}	—	October 28, 2014	Haleakala	Pan-STARRS 1	·	1.4 km	MPC · JPL
824754	2017 FL_{138}	—	November 5, 2002	Kitt Peak	Spacewatch	·	490 m	MPC · JPL
824755	2017 FD_{142}	—	February 2, 2017	Haleakala	Pan-STARRS 1	H	340 m	MPC · JPL
824756	2017 FO_{143}	—	August 22, 2014	Haleakala	Pan-STARRS 1	·	870 m	MPC · JPL
824757	2017 FQ_{147}	—	December 3, 2015	Haleakala	Pan-STARRS 1	·	1.4 km	MPC · JPL
824758	2017 FS_{148}	—	September 17, 2009	Kitt Peak	Spacewatch	·	2.2 km	MPC · JPL
824759	2017 FA_{149}	—	June 29, 2014	Haleakala	Pan-STARRS 1	·	910 m	MPC · JPL
824760	2017 FF_{151}	—	September 25, 2009	Mount Lemmon	Mount Lemmon Survey	·	1.6 km	MPC · JPL
824761	2017 FX_{153}	—	February 21, 2017	Haleakala	Pan-STARRS 1	TIR	2.5 km	MPC · JPL
824762	2017 FG_{154}	—	July 30, 2005	Palomar	NEAT	·	1.3 km	MPC · JPL
824763	2017 FD_{156}	—	September 23, 2015	Haleakala	Pan-STARRS 1	·	2.3 km	MPC · JPL
824764	2017 FG_{158}	—	January 8, 2010	Kitt Peak	Spacewatch	·	560 m	MPC · JPL
824765	2017 FC_{169}	—	March 27, 2017	Mount Lemmon	Mount Lemmon Survey	·	1.9 km	MPC · JPL
824766	2017 FQ_{170}	—	March 25, 2017	Haleakala	Pan-STARRS 1	H	370 m	MPC · JPL
824767	2017 FW_{170}	—	March 31, 2017	Haleakala	Pan-STARRS 1	H	400 m	MPC · JPL
824768	2017 FP_{178}	—	February 6, 2002	Kitt Peak	Deep Ecliptic Survey	·	870 m	MPC · JPL
824769	2017 FE_{179}	—	March 26, 2017	XuYi	PMO NEO Survey Program	·	1.1 km	MPC · JPL
824770	2017 FX_{180}	—	March 27, 2017	Mount Lemmon	Mount Lemmon Survey	EMA	2.5 km	MPC · JPL
824771	2017 FG_{189}	—	March 21, 2017	Haleakala	Pan-STARRS 1	V	470 m	MPC · JPL
824772	2017 FO_{190}	—	March 5, 2013	Mount Lemmon	Mount Lemmon Survey	·	880 m	MPC · JPL
824773	2017 FE_{194}	—	March 22, 2017	Haleakala	Pan-STARRS 1	NYS	990 m	MPC · JPL
824774	2017 FR_{195}	—	June 3, 2005	Siding Spring	SSS	·	1.1 km	MPC · JPL
824775	2017 FF_{196}	—	March 20, 2017	Haleakala	Pan-STARRS 1	LIX	2.5 km	MPC · JPL
824776	2017 FT_{199}	—	March 27, 2017	Mount Lemmon	Mount Lemmon Survey	·	760 m	MPC · JPL
824777	2017 FG_{202}	—	March 27, 2017	Haleakala	Pan-STARRS 1	·	2.4 km	MPC · JPL
824778	2017 FN_{202}	—	March 30, 2017	Mount Lemmon	Mount Lemmon Survey	H	410 m	MPC · JPL
824779	2017 FH_{204}	—	March 30, 2017	Mount Lemmon	Mount Lemmon Survey	H	330 m	MPC · JPL
824780	2017 GB_{2}	—	December 18, 2015	Mount Lemmon	Mount Lemmon Survey	·	1.4 km	MPC · JPL
824781	2017 GL_{3}	—	August 23, 2014	Haleakala	Pan-STARRS 1	·	1.8 km	MPC · JPL
824782	2017 GA_{5}	—	April 3, 2017	Mount Lemmon	Mount Lemmon Survey	H	370 m	MPC · JPL
824783	2017 GB_{5}	—	April 3, 2017	Mount Lemmon	Mount Lemmon Survey	H	440 m	MPC · JPL
824784	2017 GP_{11}	—	April 5, 2017	Haleakala	Pan-STARRS 1	·	2.4 km	MPC · JPL
824785	2017 GT_{11}	—	April 1, 2017	Haleakala	Pan-STARRS 1	·	830 m	MPC · JPL
824786	2017 GS_{12}	—	March 30, 2016	Cerro Tololo	DECam	EUN	780 m	MPC · JPL
824787	2017 GP_{13}	—	April 6, 2017	Mount Lemmon	Mount Lemmon Survey	EUN	770 m	MPC · JPL
824788	2017 GM_{16}	—	April 8, 2017	Mount Lemmon	Mount Lemmon Survey	H	480 m	MPC · JPL
824789	2017 GD_{17}	—	April 5, 2017	Mount Lemmon	Mount Lemmon Survey	H	470 m	MPC · JPL
824790	2017 GF_{17}	—	April 7, 2017	Mount Lemmon	Mount Lemmon Survey	H	450 m	MPC · JPL
824791	2017 GL_{26}	—	April 6, 2017	Mount Lemmon	Mount Lemmon Survey	H	370 m	MPC · JPL
824792	2017 GG_{27}	—	February 19, 2009	Catalina	CSS	H	380 m	MPC · JPL
824793	2017 GL_{27}	—	April 6, 2017	Haleakala	Pan-STARRS 1	H	440 m	MPC · JPL
824794	2017 GP_{27}	—	December 25, 2010	Mount Lemmon	Mount Lemmon Survey	H	380 m	MPC · JPL
824795	2017 HV_{1}	—	June 15, 2012	Haleakala	Pan-STARRS 1	H	350 m	MPC · JPL
824796	2017 HA_{2}	—	October 9, 2015	Catalina	CSS	H	340 m	MPC · JPL
824797	2017 HJ_{4}	—	September 18, 2014	Haleakala	Pan-STARRS 1	·	1.8 km	MPC · JPL
824798	2017 HL_{4}	—	April 25, 2017	Haleakala	Pan-STARRS 1	H	350 m	MPC · JPL
824799	2017 HN_{4}	—	October 4, 2002	Campo Imperatore	CINEOS	H	380 m	MPC · JPL
824800	2017 HT_{4}	—	April 4, 2017	Haleakala	Pan-STARRS 1	H	400 m	MPC · JPL

== 824801–824900 ==
back to top

Designation			Discovery			Properties		Ref
Permanent	Provisional	Named after	Date	Site	Discoverer(s)	Category	Diam.	Ref
824801	2017 HP_{7}	—	May 6, 2008	Markleeville	W. G. Dillon, D. Wells	·	1.6 km	MPC · JPL
824802	2017 HC_{9}	—	March 8, 2013	Haleakala	Pan-STARRS 1	·	920 m	MPC · JPL
824803	2017 HV_{9}	—	April 3, 2017	Mount Lemmon	Mount Lemmon Survey	·	2.2 km	MPC · JPL
824804	2017 HY_{10}	—	August 27, 2014	Haleakala	Pan-STARRS 1	·	2.8 km	MPC · JPL
824805	2017 HJ_{16}	—	April 19, 2017	Mount Lemmon	Mount Lemmon Survey	3:2	3.6 km	MPC · JPL
824806	2017 HO_{22}	—	April 6, 2017	Haleakala	Pan-STARRS 1	H	490 m	MPC · JPL
824807	2017 HK_{32}	—	March 11, 2011	Kitt Peak	Spacewatch	·	2.6 km	MPC · JPL
824808	2017 HM_{47}	—	March 16, 2013	Kitt Peak	Spacewatch	·	940 m	MPC · JPL
824809	2017 HR_{52}	—	March 27, 2008	Mount Lemmon	Mount Lemmon Survey	·	1.1 km	MPC · JPL
824810	2017 HS_{60}	—	September 23, 2008	Mount Lemmon	Mount Lemmon Survey	·	1.9 km	MPC · JPL
824811	2017 HE_{63}	—	April 19, 2017	Haleakala	Pan-STARRS 1	H	340 m	MPC · JPL
824812	2017 HZ_{65}	—	April 22, 2017	Mount Lemmon	Mount Lemmon Survey	H	370 m	MPC · JPL
824813	2017 HD_{66}	—	April 27, 2017	Haleakala	Pan-STARRS 1	H	400 m	MPC · JPL
824814	2017 HS_{66}	—	April 22, 2017	Mount Lemmon	Mount Lemmon Survey	H	390 m	MPC · JPL
824815	2017 HR_{68}	—	April 20, 2017	Haleakala	Pan-STARRS 1	·	440 m	MPC · JPL
824816	2017 HG_{69}	—	April 28, 2017	Haleakala	Pan-STARRS 1	·	760 m	MPC · JPL
824817	2017 HL_{69}	—	April 19, 2017	Mount Lemmon	Mount Lemmon Survey	·	520 m	MPC · JPL
824818	2017 HH_{70}	—	April 22, 2017	Mount Lemmon	Mount Lemmon Survey	H	380 m	MPC · JPL
824819	2017 HG_{74}	—	April 22, 2017	Mount Lemmon	Mount Lemmon Survey	H	360 m	MPC · JPL
824820	2017 HY_{74}	—	April 16, 2017	Mount Lemmon	Mount Lemmon Survey	·	950 m	MPC · JPL
824821	2017 HR_{75}	—	April 26, 2017	Haleakala	Pan-STARRS 1	·	810 m	MPC · JPL
824822	2017 HX_{76}	—	April 26, 2017	Haleakala	Pan-STARRS 1	·	940 m	MPC · JPL
824823	2017 HG_{77}	—	April 26, 2017	Haleakala	Pan-STARRS 1	MAR	570 m	MPC · JPL
824824	2017 HC_{78}	—	April 26, 2017	Haleakala	Pan-STARRS 1	·	950 m	MPC · JPL
824825	2017 HC_{79}	—	February 11, 2016	Haleakala	Pan-STARRS 1	3:2 · SHU	3.7 km	MPC · JPL
824826	2017 HE_{80}	—	April 26, 2017	Haleakala	Pan-STARRS 1	·	820 m	MPC · JPL
824827	2017 HY_{83}	—	April 30, 2017	Kitt Peak	Spacewatch	·	730 m	MPC · JPL
824828	2017 HA_{88}	—	April 20, 2017	Haleakala	Pan-STARRS 1	·	600 m	MPC · JPL
824829	2017 HJ_{96}	—	April 26, 2017	Haleakala	Pan-STARRS 1	H	350 m	MPC · JPL
824830	2017 HB_{100}	—	April 25, 2017	Haleakala	Pan-STARRS 1	·	910 m	MPC · JPL
824831	2017 JG	—	January 10, 2011	Mount Lemmon	Mount Lemmon Survey	·	1.3 km	MPC · JPL
824832	2017 JZ_{2}	—	April 1, 2009	Mount Lemmon	Mount Lemmon Survey	H	410 m	MPC · JPL
824833	2017 JT_{8}	—	May 4, 2017	Haleakala	Pan-STARRS 1	·	700 m	MPC · JPL
824834	2017 JD_{9}	—	October 22, 2014	Kitt Peak	Spacewatch	·	1.2 km	MPC · JPL
824835	2017 JY_{9}	—	May 4, 2017	Haleakala	Pan-STARRS 1	H	410 m	MPC · JPL
824836	2017 JQ_{11}	—	March 4, 2016	Haleakala	Pan-STARRS 1	ARM	2.6 km	MPC · JPL
824837	2017 KV_{3}	—	July 28, 2012	Haleakala	Pan-STARRS 1	H	390 m	MPC · JPL
824838	2017 KD_{4}	—	September 20, 2015	Catalina	CSS	H	500 m	MPC · JPL
824839	2017 KT_{4}	—	May 21, 2017	Haleakala	Pan-STARRS 1	APO +1km	1.2 km	MPC · JPL
824840	2017 KO_{13}	—	May 5, 2011	Kitt Peak	Spacewatch	·	2.3 km	MPC · JPL
824841	2017 KH_{17}	—	October 8, 2008	Mount Lemmon	Mount Lemmon Survey	·	450 m	MPC · JPL
824842	2017 KT_{21}	—	November 22, 2006	Kitt Peak	Spacewatch	·	860 m	MPC · JPL
824843	2017 KT_{25}	—	September 4, 2013	Mount Lemmon	Mount Lemmon Survey	·	1.6 km	MPC · JPL
824844	2017 KA_{26}	—	November 13, 2015	Kitt Peak	Spacewatch	·	760 m	MPC · JPL
824845	2017 KA_{31}	—	October 24, 2015	Haleakala	Pan-STARRS 1	H	420 m	MPC · JPL
824846	2017 KC_{32}	—	December 7, 2015	Haleakala	Pan-STARRS 1	BAR	1.3 km	MPC · JPL
824847	2017 KO_{33}	—	March 18, 2013	Mount Lemmon	Mount Lemmon Survey	·	930 m	MPC · JPL
824848	2017 KJ_{34}	—	March 23, 2017	Oukaïmeden	C. Rinner	·	2.4 km	MPC · JPL
824849	2017 KK_{34}	—	May 31, 2017	Haleakala	Pan-STARRS 1	H	390 m	MPC · JPL
824850	2017 KB_{35}	—	September 10, 2015	Haleakala	Pan-STARRS 1	H	310 m	MPC · JPL
824851	2017 KH_{38}	—	May 26, 2017	Haleakala	Pan-STARRS 1	THB	2.6 km	MPC · JPL
824852	2017 KM_{39}	—	May 22, 2017	Haleakala	Pan-STARRS 1	H	410 m	MPC · JPL
824853	2017 KN_{39}	—	May 17, 2017	Haleakala	Pan-STARRS 1	H	390 m	MPC · JPL
824854	2017 KQ_{44}	—	May 19, 2017	Haleakala	Pan-STARRS 1	·	620 m	MPC · JPL
824855	2017 KB_{46}	—	May 21, 2017	Haleakala	Pan-STARRS 1	·	980 m	MPC · JPL
824856	2017 KS_{48}	—	May 27, 2017	Haleakala	Pan-STARRS 1	·	1.2 km	MPC · JPL
824857	2017 KO_{53}	—	May 21, 2017	Haleakala	Pan-STARRS 1	·	1 km	MPC · JPL
824858	2017 LR_{2}	—	June 1, 2017	Haleakala	Pan-STARRS 1	H	430 m	MPC · JPL
824859	2017 LX_{3}	—	June 2, 2017	Cerro Tololo	M. Micheli, F. Valdes	HNS	740 m	MPC · JPL
824860	2017 ME_{2}	—	March 3, 2016	Haleakala	Pan-STARRS 1	EUN	1.0 km	MPC · JPL
824861	2017 ML_{3}	—	June 23, 2017	Haleakala	Pan-STARRS 1	H	420 m	MPC · JPL
824862	2017 ME_{14}	—	June 30, 2017	Mount Lemmon	Mount Lemmon Survey	H	470 m	MPC · JPL
824863	2017 MH_{15}	—	June 27, 2017	Mount Lemmon	Mount Lemmon Survey	·	720 m	MPC · JPL
824864	2017 MK_{16}	—	March 12, 2016	Haleakala	Pan-STARRS 1	·	1.2 km	MPC · JPL
824865	2017 MX_{19}	—	June 21, 2017	Haleakala	Pan-STARRS 1	·	1.6 km	MPC · JPL
824866	2017 MO_{21}	—	June 24, 2017	Haleakala	Pan-STARRS 1	HNS	890 m	MPC · JPL
824867	2017 MG_{22}	—	December 16, 2014	Haleakala	Pan-STARRS 1	MAR	860 m	MPC · JPL
824868	2017 MW_{24}	—	June 25, 2017	Haleakala	Pan-STARRS 1	·	1.3 km	MPC · JPL
824869	2017 MH_{28}	—	June 24, 2017	Haleakala	Pan-STARRS 1	T_{j} (2.99) · (895)	2.3 km	MPC · JPL
824870	2017 MS_{32}	—	December 29, 2014	Mount Lemmon	Mount Lemmon Survey	MAR	950 m	MPC · JPL
824871	2017 MR_{39}	—	June 21, 2017	Haleakala	Pan-STARRS 1	HNS	860 m	MPC · JPL
824872	2017 NT_{4}	—	July 5, 2017	Haleakala	Pan-STARRS 1	·	990 m	MPC · JPL
824873	2017 NK_{7}	—	July 4, 2017	Haleakala	Pan-STARRS 1	EOS	1.4 km	MPC · JPL
824874	2017 NY_{7}	—	August 16, 2006	Siding Spring	SSS	·	2.3 km	MPC · JPL
824875	2017 NA_{12}	—	July 1, 2017	Mount Lemmon	Mount Lemmon Survey	·	2.2 km	MPC · JPL
824876	2017 NB_{13}	—	April 2, 2016	Haleakala	Pan-STARRS 1	·	2.0 km	MPC · JPL
824877	2017 NM_{19}	—	June 24, 2017	Haleakala	Pan-STARRS 1	·	1.1 km	MPC · JPL
824878	2017 NH_{25}	—	July 4, 2017	Haleakala	Pan-STARRS 1	·	1.5 km	MPC · JPL
824879	2017 NB_{28}	—	July 5, 2017	Haleakala	Pan-STARRS 1	EUN	860 m	MPC · JPL
824880	2017 OX	—	July 14, 2013	Haleakala	Pan-STARRS 1	·	1.5 km	MPC · JPL
824881	2017 OS_{4}	—	July 5, 2003	Kitt Peak	Spacewatch	·	740 m	MPC · JPL
824882	2017 OJ_{8}	—	July 15, 2017	Haleakala	Pan-STARRS 1	MAS	610 m	MPC · JPL
824883	2017 OO_{17}	—	October 26, 2014	Mount Lemmon	Mount Lemmon Survey	·	500 m	MPC · JPL
824884	2017 OA_{18}	—	October 1, 2013	Kitt Peak	Spacewatch	AGN	910 m	MPC · JPL
824885	2017 OF_{18}	—	April 5, 2016	Haleakala	Pan-STARRS 1	·	1.1 km	MPC · JPL
824886	2017 OK_{20}	—	November 1, 2005	Mount Lemmon	Mount Lemmon Survey	·	1.2 km	MPC · JPL
824887	2017 OQ_{20}	—	August 30, 2005	Kitt Peak	Spacewatch	·	780 m	MPC · JPL
824888	2017 OT_{26}	—	September 30, 2013	Mount Lemmon	Mount Lemmon Survey	EUN	1.0 km	MPC · JPL
824889	2017 OJ_{29}	—	July 26, 2017	Haleakala	Pan-STARRS 1	·	960 m	MPC · JPL
824890	2017 OZ_{30}	—	March 12, 2016	Haleakala	Pan-STARRS 1	·	1.3 km	MPC · JPL
824891	2017 OD_{33}	—	January 16, 2016	Haleakala	Pan-STARRS 1	·	900 m	MPC · JPL
824892	2017 OP_{33}	—	March 28, 2016	Cerro Tololo	DECam	·	920 m	MPC · JPL
824893	2017 ON_{34}	—	October 15, 2013	Kitt Peak	Spacewatch	·	1.3 km	MPC · JPL
824894	2017 OQ_{34}	—	April 15, 2012	Haleakala	Pan-STARRS 1	·	870 m	MPC · JPL
824895	2017 OB_{39}	—	August 25, 2012	Mount Lemmon	Mount Lemmon Survey	·	1.4 km	MPC · JPL
824896	2017 OV_{39}	—	July 27, 2017	Haleakala	Pan-STARRS 1	·	2.7 km	MPC · JPL
824897	2017 OR_{41}	—	July 22, 2017	Haleakala	Pan-STARRS 1	·	990 m	MPC · JPL
824898	2017 OX_{41}	—	July 27, 2017	Haleakala	Pan-STARRS 1	EUN	700 m	MPC · JPL
824899	2017 OC_{47}	—	March 31, 2016	Cerro Tololo	DECam	·	890 m	MPC · JPL
824900	2017 ON_{47}	—	June 18, 2013	Haleakala	Pan-STARRS 1	·	890 m	MPC · JPL

== 824901–825000 ==
back to top

Designation			Discovery			Properties		Ref
Permanent	Provisional	Named after	Date	Site	Discoverer(s)	Category	Diam.	Ref
824901	2017 ON_{50}	—	August 22, 2004	Kitt Peak	Spacewatch	·	990 m	MPC · JPL
824902	2017 OT_{55}	—	October 3, 2013	Kitt Peak	Spacewatch	·	1.4 km	MPC · JPL
824903	2017 OO_{56}	—	March 30, 2016	Cerro Paranal	Gaia Ground Based Optical Tracking	·	1.2 km	MPC · JPL
824904	2017 OO_{58}	—	January 20, 2015	Haleakala	Pan-STARRS 1	·	1.6 km	MPC · JPL
824905	2017 OQ_{59}	—	July 30, 2017	Haleakala	Pan-STARRS 1	·	2.2 km	MPC · JPL
824906	2017 OA_{60}	—	September 1, 2013	Mount Lemmon	Mount Lemmon Survey	·	730 m	MPC · JPL
824907	2017 OE_{60}	—	July 30, 2017	Haleakala	Pan-STARRS 1	·	1.3 km	MPC · JPL
824908	2017 OJ_{60}	—	July 30, 2017	Haleakala	Pan-STARRS 1	·	2.6 km	MPC · JPL
824909	2017 OO_{60}	—	May 15, 2008	Mount Lemmon	Mount Lemmon Survey	·	1.2 km	MPC · JPL
824910	2017 OV_{63}	—	September 25, 2006	Anderson Mesa	LONEOS	NYS	930 m	MPC · JPL
824911	2017 OM_{65}	—	September 10, 2013	Haleakala	Pan-STARRS 1	·	810 m	MPC · JPL
824912	2017 OV_{65}	—	March 12, 2016	Haleakala	Pan-STARRS 1	PHO	680 m	MPC · JPL
824913	2017 OC_{68}	—	July 1, 2017	Haleakala	Pan-STARRS 1	·	2.7 km	MPC · JPL
824914	2017 OO_{69}	—	July 30, 2017	Haleakala	Pan-STARRS 1	·	2.4 km	MPC · JPL
824915	2017 OX_{72}	—	April 9, 2010	Kitt Peak	Spacewatch	·	2.3 km	MPC · JPL
824916	2017 OZ_{75}	—	April 18, 2015	Cerro Tololo	DECam	·	2.4 km	MPC · JPL
824917	2017 OM_{79}	—	August 10, 2010	Kitt Peak	Spacewatch	·	540 m	MPC · JPL
824918	2017 OQ_{83}	—	May 7, 2016	Haleakala	Pan-STARRS 1	·	1.9 km	MPC · JPL
824919	2017 OE_{84}	—	July 30, 2017	Haleakala	Pan-STARRS 1	·	990 m	MPC · JPL
824920	2017 OS_{85}	—	July 26, 2017	Haleakala	Pan-STARRS 1	·	900 m	MPC · JPL
824921	2017 OD_{89}	—	July 29, 2017	Haleakala	Pan-STARRS 1	·	520 m	MPC · JPL
824922	2017 OB_{90}	—	July 26, 2017	Haleakala	Pan-STARRS 1	·	660 m	MPC · JPL
824923	2017 OF_{92}	—	July 30, 2017	Haleakala	Pan-STARRS 1	(5)	930 m	MPC · JPL
824924	2017 OJ_{92}	—	July 30, 2017	Haleakala	Pan-STARRS 1	·	650 m	MPC · JPL
824925	2017 OV_{92}	—	July 27, 2017	Haleakala	Pan-STARRS 1	·	2.5 km	MPC · JPL
824926	2017 OG_{93}	—	July 21, 2017	ESA OGS	ESA OGS	V	400 m	MPC · JPL
824927	2017 OZ_{95}	—	July 30, 2017	Haleakala	Pan-STARRS 1	·	470 m	MPC · JPL
824928	2017 OJ_{98}	—	June 29, 2017	Mount Lemmon	Mount Lemmon Survey	·	1.8 km	MPC · JPL
824929	2017 OT_{103}	—	July 25, 2017	Haleakala	Pan-STARRS 1	HNS	830 m	MPC · JPL
824930	2017 OY_{104}	—	July 30, 2017	Haleakala	Pan-STARRS 1	·	560 m	MPC · JPL
824931	2017 OH_{106}	—	February 20, 2015	Mount Lemmon	Mount Lemmon Survey	·	1.7 km	MPC · JPL
824932	2017 OC_{117}	—	July 26, 2017	Haleakala	Pan-STARRS 1	MRX	800 m	MPC · JPL
824933	2017 OB_{121}	—	July 30, 2017	Haleakala	Pan-STARRS 1	AGN	840 m	MPC · JPL
824934	2017 ON_{121}	—	July 29, 2017	Haleakala	Pan-STARRS 1	·	1.1 km	MPC · JPL
824935	2017 OT_{121}	—	July 30, 2017	Haleakala	Pan-STARRS 1	·	1.4 km	MPC · JPL
824936	2017 OK_{126}	—	July 27, 2017	Haleakala	Pan-STARRS 1	·	1.1 km	MPC · JPL
824937	2017 OL_{126}	—	April 9, 2016	Haleakala	Pan-STARRS 1	·	940 m	MPC · JPL
824938	2017 OP_{126}	—	July 15, 2005	Kitt Peak	Spacewatch	·	740 m	MPC · JPL
824939	2017 OO_{132}	—	April 10, 2013	Mount Lemmon	Mount Lemmon Survey	·	540 m	MPC · JPL
824940	2017 OC_{144}	—	July 25, 2017	Haleakala	Pan-STARRS 1	·	540 m	MPC · JPL
824941	2017 OF_{145}	—	July 26, 2017	Haleakala	Pan-STARRS 1	·	1.6 km	MPC · JPL
824942	2017 OQ_{150}	—	July 29, 2017	Haleakala	Pan-STARRS 1	·	1.1 km	MPC · JPL
824943	2017 OL_{152}	—	January 22, 2015	Haleakala	Pan-STARRS 1	HOF	1.7 km	MPC · JPL
824944	2017 OX_{157}	—	January 17, 2015	Haleakala	Pan-STARRS 1	·	1.1 km	MPC · JPL
824945	2017 OA_{195}	—	July 25, 2017	Haleakala	Pan-STARRS 1	·	680 m	MPC · JPL
824946	2017 PK_{7}	—	August 1, 2017	Haleakala	Pan-STARRS 1	·	1.1 km	MPC · JPL
824947	2017 PF_{20}	—	November 8, 2013	Mount Lemmon	Mount Lemmon Survey	HOF	1.8 km	MPC · JPL
824948	2017 PY_{21}	—	May 3, 2016	Haleakala	Pan-STARRS 1	·	1.3 km	MPC · JPL
824949	2017 PW_{23}	—	September 23, 2013	Kitt Peak	Spacewatch	·	970 m	MPC · JPL
824950	2017 PF_{30}	—	November 18, 2014	Mount Lemmon	Mount Lemmon Survey	·	710 m	MPC · JPL
824951	2017 PK_{32}	—	April 4, 2002	Palomar	NEAT	·	840 m	MPC · JPL
824952	2017 PT_{34}	—	August 18, 2014	Haleakala	Pan-STARRS 1	·	580 m	MPC · JPL
824953	2017 PG_{38}	—	February 16, 2015	Haleakala	Pan-STARRS 1	EOS	1.3 km	MPC · JPL
824954	2017 PB_{54}	—	August 3, 2017	Haleakala	Pan-STARRS 1	·	1.5 km	MPC · JPL
824955	2017 PT_{59}	—	May 7, 2016	Haleakala	Pan-STARRS 1	·	1.3 km	MPC · JPL
824956	2017 PY_{63}	—	August 1, 2017	Haleakala	Pan-STARRS 1	·	1.2 km	MPC · JPL
824957	2017 PX_{64}	—	August 3, 2017	Haleakala	Pan-STARRS 1	·	890 m	MPC · JPL
824958	2017 PF_{65}	—	January 21, 2015	Haleakala	Pan-STARRS 1	AGN	790 m	MPC · JPL
824959	2017 PS_{67}	—	April 18, 2015	Cerro Tololo	DECam	·	2.1 km	MPC · JPL
824960	2017 PC_{72}	—	November 13, 2007	Kitt Peak	Spacewatch	·	540 m	MPC · JPL
824961	2017 PV_{90}	—	January 20, 2015	Haleakala	Pan-STARRS 1	·	1.2 km	MPC · JPL
824962	2017 QY_{1}	—	November 16, 2015	Haleakala	Pan-STARRS 1	H	490 m	MPC · JPL
824963	2017 QS_{7}	—	July 15, 2013	Haleakala	Pan-STARRS 1	·	700 m	MPC · JPL
824964	2017 QP_{8}	—	January 29, 2011	Mount Lemmon	Mount Lemmon Survey	MAR	590 m	MPC · JPL
824965	2017 QZ_{9}	—	October 14, 2010	Mount Lemmon	Mount Lemmon Survey	MAS	540 m	MPC · JPL
824966	2017 QA_{10}	—	July 29, 2008	Kitt Peak	Spacewatch	·	1.2 km	MPC · JPL
824967	2017 QP_{10}	—	July 5, 2017	Haleakala	Pan-STARRS 1	·	1.2 km	MPC · JPL
824968	2017 QK_{15}	—	February 7, 2011	Mount Lemmon	Mount Lemmon Survey	·	1.2 km	MPC · JPL
824969	2017 QV_{22}	—	July 26, 2017	Haleakala	Pan-STARRS 1	·	970 m	MPC · JPL
824970	2017 QW_{23}	—	October 9, 2013	Catalina	CSS	·	1.4 km	MPC · JPL
824971	2017 QE_{27}	—	September 3, 2005	Mauna Kea	P. A. Wiegert	·	830 m	MPC · JPL
824972	2017 QH_{30}	—	September 14, 2013	Kitt Peak	Spacewatch	·	810 m	MPC · JPL
824973	2017 QE_{42}	—	October 8, 2012	Haleakala	Pan-STARRS 1	THM	1.5 km	MPC · JPL
824974	2017 QX_{49}	—	May 12, 2012	Mount Lemmon	Mount Lemmon Survey	·	1.0 km	MPC · JPL
824975	2017 QP_{50}	—	January 22, 2015	Haleakala	Pan-STARRS 1	·	1.2 km	MPC · JPL
824976	2017 QM_{52}	—	November 9, 2013	Mount Lemmon	Mount Lemmon Survey	·	1.4 km	MPC · JPL
824977	2017 QP_{58}	—	August 14, 2012	Siding Spring	SSS	·	1.2 km	MPC · JPL
824978	2017 QA_{59}	—	February 5, 2016	Haleakala	Pan-STARRS 1	NYS	870 m	MPC · JPL
824979	2017 QG_{59}	—	August 20, 2017	Haleakala	Pan-STARRS 1	·	2.0 km	MPC · JPL
824980	2017 QT_{59}	—	September 29, 2009	Mount Lemmon	Mount Lemmon Survey	·	930 m	MPC · JPL
824981	2017 QU_{62}	—	August 24, 2012	Mayhill-ISON	L. Elenin	·	1.7 km	MPC · JPL
824982	2017 QY_{63}	—	February 11, 2011	Mount Lemmon	Mount Lemmon Survey	ADE	1.4 km	MPC · JPL
824983	2017 QU_{67}	—	August 24, 2017	Haleakala	Pan-STARRS 1	JUN	990 m	MPC · JPL
824984	2017 QA_{68}	—	August 31, 2017	Mount Lemmon	Mount Lemmon Survey	(116763)	1.3 km	MPC · JPL
824985	2017 QV_{73}	—	March 30, 2016	Cerro Tololo	DECam	·	700 m	MPC · JPL
824986	2017 QL_{81}	—	August 20, 2017	Haleakala	Pan-STARRS 1	·	490 m	MPC · JPL
824987	2017 QM_{85}	—	May 30, 2008	Mount Lemmon	Mount Lemmon Survey	·	1.4 km	MPC · JPL
824988	2017 QE_{92}	—	August 18, 2017	Haleakala	Pan-STARRS 1	·	560 m	MPC · JPL
824989	2017 QU_{92}	—	March 13, 2016	Haleakala	Pan-STARRS 1	·	1.1 km	MPC · JPL
824990	2017 QB_{93}	—	August 31, 2017	Haleakala	Pan-STARRS 1	H	360 m	MPC · JPL
824991	2017 QJ_{96}	—	August 22, 2017	Haleakala	Pan-STARRS 1	·	900 m	MPC · JPL
824992	2017 QP_{99}	—	May 1, 2016	Cerro Tololo	DECam	·	720 m	MPC · JPL
824993	2017 QB_{101}	—	April 19, 2015	Cerro Tololo	DECam	·	2.2 km	MPC · JPL
824994	2017 QQ_{109}	—	August 28, 2017	Mount Lemmon	Mount Lemmon Survey	·	1.1 km	MPC · JPL
824995	2017 QB_{113}	—	August 31, 2017	Haleakala	Pan-STARRS 1	·	940 m	MPC · JPL
824996	2017 QD_{117}	—	June 22, 2017	ESA OGS	ESA OGS	·	1.5 km	MPC · JPL
824997	2017 QH_{120}	—	August 18, 2017	Haleakala	Pan-STARRS 1	·	920 m	MPC · JPL
824998	2017 QE_{125}	—	August 31, 2017	Mount Lemmon	Mount Lemmon Survey	EUN	1.1 km	MPC · JPL
824999	2017 QY_{126}	—	August 31, 2017	Haleakala	Pan-STARRS 1	·	1.3 km	MPC · JPL
825000	2017 QJ_{127}	—	August 31, 2017	Mount Lemmon	Mount Lemmon Survey	·	920 m	MPC · JPL

back to top

== Meaning of names ==
As minor planet discoveries are confirmed, they are given a permanent number by the IAU's Minor Planet Center (MPC), and the discoverers can then submit names for them, following the IAU's naming conventions. The list below concerns those minor planets in the specified number-range that have received names, and explains the meanings of those names.

Official naming citations of newly named small Solar System bodies are approved and published in a bulletin by IAU's Working Group for Small Bodies Nomenclature (WGSBN). Before May 2021, citations were published in MPC's Minor Planet Circulars for many decades. Recent citations can also be found on the JPL Small-Body Database (SBDB). Until his death in 2016, German astronomer Lutz D. Schmadel compiled these citations into the Dictionary of Minor Planet Names (DMP) and regularly updated the collection.

Based on Paul Herget's The Names of the Minor Planets, Schmadel also researched the unclear origin of numerous asteroids, most of which had been named prior to World War II. This article incorporates text from this source, which is in the public domain: SBDB New namings may only be added to this list below after official publication as the preannouncement of names is condemned. The WGSBN publishes a comprehensive guideline for the naming rules of non-cometary small Solar System bodies.

Named minor planet	Provisional	This minor planet was named for...	Ref · Catalog
824655 Funes	2017 DG_{71}	José G. Funes, S.J., Argentine Jesuit, served as Director of the Vatican Observatory (2006–2015).	IAU · 824655
