= Marco Micheli =

Italian astronomer

- Born: 1983 (age 42–43); Brescia, Lombardy, Italy
- Education: University of Pisa
- Scientific career
- Fields: astronomy, planetary science
- Workplaces: ESA Centre for Earth Observation; Pan-STARRS

Marco Micheli (born 1983) is an Italian astronomer and a discoverer of minor planets. He is a researcher at the Centre for Earth Observation of ESA's Space Situational Awareness Programme in Italy.

== Career ==
Micheli was born in Brescia, Italy, in 1983. He graduated in 2007 in astronomy and astrophysics at the University of Pisa with a thesis on the YORP effect, and moved for his doctorate to the University of Hawaii where he studied Near-Earth objects and how their streams cause meteor showers. He then moved to ESA's Centre for Earth Observation in Frascati, Italy.

As a member of the Pan-STARRS astronomical survey team, he holds the record of new asteroids detected in a single night since 29 January 2011. According to the Minor Planet Center (MPC) he discovered between 2005 and 2010 twelve asteroids, partly in collaboration with Wladimiro Marinello and Gianpaolo Pizzetti (see list).

In June 2018 he published a study on 1I/ʻOumuamua, the first Interstellar object, where the discovery of a non-gravitational acceleration acting on the object is reported. This suggests that the celestial body may be a comet, although it has not shown any noticeable activity in the visual spectrum during transit in the Solar System.

=== List of discovered minor planets ===
177853 Lumezzane	5 August 2005	list^{[A]}
229836 Wladimarinello	28 August 2009	list^{[A]}
233559 Pizzetti	4 August 2007	list^{[B]}
266710 Pedrettiadriana	31 August 2009	list
(284994) 2010 KD_{60}	20 May 2010	list
352148 Tarcisiozani	4 August 2007	list^{[A]}
(379472) 2010 DT_{40}	16 February 2010	list

(406983) 2009 RE_{5}	14 September 2009	list
(407261) 2010 BQ_{3}	21 January 2010	list
(436214) 2009 XR_{22}	13 December 2009	list
(485044) 2010 AA_{78}	15 January 2010	list
(485914) 2012 GZ_{15}	13 December 2010	list
Co-discovery made with:^{A} G. P. Pizzetti and ^{B} W. Marinello

== Awards and honors ==
Asteroid 10277 Micheli, discovered by American astronomer Schelte Bus at the Siding Spring Observatory in 1981, was named in his honor. The official naming citation was published by the MPC on 13 April 2017 (M.P.C. 103974).

== See also ==
- List of minor planet discoverers § M. Micheli
