= List of minor planets: 485001–486000 =

The following is a partial list of minor planets, running from minor-planet number 485001 through 486000, inclusive. The primary data for this and other partial lists is based on JPL's "Small-Body Orbital Elements" and data available from the Minor Planet Center. Critical list information is also provided by the MPC, unless otherwise specified from Lowell Observatory. A detailed description of the table's columns and additional sources are given on the main page including a complete list of every page in this series, and a statistical break-up on the dynamical classification of minor planets.

Also see the summary list of all named bodies in numerical and alphabetical order, and the corresponding naming citations for the number range of this particular list. New namings may only be added to this list after official publication, as the preannouncement of names is condemned by the Working Group for Small Bodies Nomenclature of the International Astronomical Union.

Near-Earth obj.	MBA (inner)	MBA (outer)	Centaur
Mars-crosser	MBA (middle)	Jupiter trojan	Trans-Neptunian obj.
Unclassified

== 485001–485100 ==
Designation			Discovery			Properties		Ref
Permanent	Provisional	Named after	Date	Site	Discoverer(s)	Category	Diam.	Ref
485001	2009 VG_{37}	—	September 21, 2009	Mount Lemmon	Mount Lemmon Survey	·	670 m	MPC · JPL
485002	2009 VE_{40}	—	November 11, 2009	Hibiscus	Teamo, N.	·	770 m	MPC · JPL
485003	2009 VM_{68}	—	April 12, 2004	Kitt Peak	Spacewatch	·	550 m	MPC · JPL
485004	2009 VN_{71}	—	November 10, 2009	Kitt Peak	Spacewatch	·	4.2 km	MPC · JPL
485005	2009 VG_{74}	—	October 18, 2009	La Sagra	OAM	·	840 m	MPC · JPL
485006	2009 VE_{83}	—	November 9, 2009	Kitt Peak	Spacewatch	·	4.2 km	MPC · JPL
485007	2009 VG_{90}	—	November 11, 2009	Kitt Peak	Spacewatch	·	2.9 km	MPC · JPL
485008	2009 VR_{92}	—	November 13, 2009	La Sagra	OAM	·	4.4 km	MPC · JPL
485009	2009 VQ_{114}	—	November 11, 2009	Mount Lemmon	Mount Lemmon Survey	·	580 m	MPC · JPL
485010	2009 VS_{116}	—	November 10, 2009	Mount Lemmon	Mount Lemmon Survey	·	660 m	MPC · JPL
485011	2009 WD_{9}	—	November 18, 2009	Socorro	LINEAR	·	1.6 km	MPC · JPL
485012	2009 WO_{15}	—	November 16, 2009	Mount Lemmon	Mount Lemmon Survey	·	480 m	MPC · JPL
485013	2009 WN_{19}	—	November 17, 2009	Mount Lemmon	Mount Lemmon Survey	·	530 m	MPC · JPL
485014	2009 WA_{32}	—	November 16, 2009	Kitt Peak	Spacewatch	·	620 m	MPC · JPL
485015	2009 WO_{32}	—	October 14, 2009	Mount Lemmon	Mount Lemmon Survey	·	4.0 km	MPC · JPL
485016	2009 WN_{36}	—	November 17, 2009	Kitt Peak	Spacewatch	·	530 m	MPC · JPL
485017	2009 WN_{53}	—	October 20, 2009	Socorro	LINEAR	·	780 m	MPC · JPL
485018	2009 WZ_{58}	—	November 8, 2009	Kitt Peak	Spacewatch	·	2.6 km	MPC · JPL
485019	2009 WC_{65}	—	September 24, 2009	Mount Lemmon	Mount Lemmon Survey	·	2.9 km	MPC · JPL
485020	2009 WV_{73}	—	November 18, 2009	Kitt Peak	Spacewatch	·	620 m	MPC · JPL
485021	2009 WX_{77}	—	November 18, 2009	Kitt Peak	Spacewatch	·	720 m	MPC · JPL
485022	2009 WL_{84}	—	November 11, 2009	Kitt Peak	Spacewatch	·	3.2 km	MPC · JPL
485023	2009 WO_{86}	—	November 19, 2009	Kitt Peak	Spacewatch	·	3.0 km	MPC · JPL
485024	2009 WP_{86}	—	November 11, 2009	Kitt Peak	Spacewatch	·	530 m	MPC · JPL
485025	2009 WN_{88}	—	November 19, 2009	Kitt Peak	Spacewatch	·	3.0 km	MPC · JPL
485026	2009 WK_{89}	—	September 28, 2003	Anderson Mesa	LONEOS	·	3.7 km	MPC · JPL
485027	2009 WA_{92}	—	November 19, 2009	Mount Lemmon	Mount Lemmon Survey	·	3.0 km	MPC · JPL
485028	2009 WG_{98}	—	September 21, 2009	Mount Lemmon	Mount Lemmon Survey	·	2.5 km	MPC · JPL
485029	2009 WH_{98}	—	October 15, 2009	Kitt Peak	Spacewatch	·	3.3 km	MPC · JPL
485030	2009 WJ_{99}	—	September 22, 2009	Mount Lemmon	Mount Lemmon Survey	·	3.9 km	MPC · JPL
485031	2009 WC_{142}	—	November 18, 2009	La Sagra	OAM	URS	4.2 km	MPC · JPL
485032	2009 WD_{142}	—	November 18, 2009	La Sagra	OAM	·	4.3 km	MPC · JPL
485033	2009 WU_{218}	—	November 8, 2009	Kitt Peak	Spacewatch	·	3.0 km	MPC · JPL
485034	2009 WU_{232}	—	October 14, 2009	Mount Lemmon	Mount Lemmon Survey	·	3.2 km	MPC · JPL
485035	2009 WJ_{234}	—	November 18, 2009	Kitt Peak	Spacewatch	·	710 m	MPC · JPL
485036	2009 YT	—	August 28, 2009	La Sagra	OAM	·	3.3 km	MPC · JPL
485037	2009 YG_{10}	—	December 18, 2009	Kitt Peak	Spacewatch	·	650 m	MPC · JPL
485038	2009 YJ_{12}	—	December 18, 2009	Mount Lemmon	Mount Lemmon Survey	·	1.5 km	MPC · JPL
485039	2010 AE_{27}	—	January 6, 2010	Kitt Peak	Spacewatch	·	560 m	MPC · JPL
485040	2010 AH_{27}	—	January 6, 2010	Kitt Peak	Spacewatch	·	770 m	MPC · JPL
485041	2010 AH_{28}	—	February 14, 2007	Lulin	LUSS	(2076)	1.0 km	MPC · JPL
485042	2010 AN_{29}	—	December 17, 2009	Kitt Peak	Spacewatch	·	610 m	MPC · JPL
485043	2010 AO_{53}	—	January 8, 2010	Kitt Peak	Spacewatch	·	650 m	MPC · JPL
485044	2010 AA_{78}	—	January 15, 2010	Faulkes Telescope	M. Micheli	·	600 m	MPC · JPL
485045	2010 AO_{81}	—	January 8, 2010	Mount Lemmon	Mount Lemmon Survey	·	630 m	MPC · JPL
485046	2010 AZ_{83}	—	April 7, 2010	Catalina	CSS	PHO	820 m	MPC · JPL
485047	2010 BD_{4}	—	January 23, 2010	Bisei SG Center	BATTeRS	·	650 m	MPC · JPL
485048	2010 BQ_{5}	—	January 18, 2010	Mauna Kea	D. J. Tholen	·	5.3 km	MPC · JPL
485049	2010 CP_{31}	—	February 9, 2010	Mount Lemmon	Mount Lemmon Survey	·	580 m	MPC · JPL
485050	2010 CA_{43}	—	February 9, 2010	Mount Lemmon	Mount Lemmon Survey	·	1.1 km	MPC · JPL
485051	2010 CM_{44}	—	February 13, 2010	Socorro	LINEAR	AMO	490 m	MPC · JPL
485052	2010 CE_{80}	—	February 13, 2010	Mount Lemmon	Mount Lemmon Survey	·	900 m	MPC · JPL
485053	2010 CB_{103}	—	February 14, 2010	Mount Lemmon	Mount Lemmon Survey	PHO	1.8 km	MPC · JPL
485054	2010 CQ_{106}	—	January 8, 2010	Kitt Peak	Spacewatch	·	690 m	MPC · JPL
485055	2010 CE_{150}	—	February 14, 2010	Mount Lemmon	Mount Lemmon Survey	PHO	2.0 km	MPC · JPL
485056	2010 CB_{173}	—	July 19, 2007	Siding Spring	SSS	·	1.5 km	MPC · JPL
485057	2010 CK_{183}	—	February 15, 2010	Haleakala	Pan-STARRS 1	·	690 m	MPC · JPL
485058	2010 CW_{247}	—	January 10, 2010	Kitt Peak	Spacewatch	·	710 m	MPC · JPL
485059	2010 DP_{6}	—	February 16, 2010	Kitt Peak	Spacewatch	·	1 km	MPC · JPL
485060	2010 DR_{6}	—	February 16, 2010	Kitt Peak	Spacewatch	·	1.2 km	MPC · JPL
485061	2010 DX_{36}	—	February 16, 2010	Kitt Peak	Spacewatch	·	1.7 km	MPC · JPL
485062	2010 DQ_{44}	—	February 17, 2010	Kitt Peak	Spacewatch	·	740 m	MPC · JPL
485063	2010 DB_{52}	—	February 21, 2010	WISE	WISE	PHO	1.8 km	MPC · JPL
485064	2010 DV_{78}	—	January 16, 2010	Catalina	CSS	PHO	1.5 km	MPC · JPL
485065	2010 EH_{21}	—	March 9, 2010	Taunus	E. Schwab, R. Kling	NYS	1.2 km	MPC · JPL
485066	2010 EX_{21}	—	March 9, 2010	La Sagra	OAM	·	920 m	MPC · JPL
485067	2010 EL_{30}	—	March 30, 2003	Anderson Mesa	LONEOS	·	870 m	MPC · JPL
485068	2010 EY_{35}	—	March 10, 2010	La Sagra	OAM	·	670 m	MPC · JPL
485069	2010 EV_{39}	—	March 11, 2010	La Sagra	OAM	·	1.0 km	MPC · JPL
485070	2010 EM_{40}	—	March 5, 2010	Kitt Peak	Spacewatch	BAP	790 m	MPC · JPL
485071	2010 EU_{69}	—	March 13, 2010	Catalina	CSS	·	1.7 km	MPC · JPL
485072	2010 EN_{80}	—	March 12, 2010	Mount Lemmon	Mount Lemmon Survey	ERI	1.3 km	MPC · JPL
485073	2010 EN_{84}	—	September 30, 2005	Mount Lemmon	Mount Lemmon Survey	3:2	5.2 km	MPC · JPL
485074	2010 EB_{88}	—	March 14, 2010	La Sagra	OAM	·	1.1 km	MPC · JPL
485075	2010 EO_{91}	—	February 17, 2010	Mount Lemmon	Mount Lemmon Survey	·	980 m	MPC · JPL
485076	2010 EE_{99}	—	March 14, 2010	Kitt Peak	Spacewatch	·	890 m	MPC · JPL
485077	2010 ER_{109}	—	March 4, 2010	Kitt Peak	Spacewatch	·	670 m	MPC · JPL
485078	2010 EF_{111}	—	June 1, 2000	Kitt Peak	Spacewatch	·	500 m	MPC · JPL
485079	2010 ET_{120}	—	March 13, 2010	Kitt Peak	Spacewatch	NYS	1.0 km	MPC · JPL
485080	2010 ES_{121}	—	November 29, 2005	Kitt Peak	Spacewatch	·	610 m	MPC · JPL
485081	2010 ES_{127}	—	October 28, 2008	Kitt Peak	Spacewatch	·	1.3 km	MPC · JPL
485082	2010 EG_{129}	—	March 12, 2010	Kitt Peak	Spacewatch	·	850 m	MPC · JPL
485083	2010 EK_{130}	—	March 13, 2010	Kitt Peak	Spacewatch	MAS	660 m	MPC · JPL
485084	2010 EH_{131}	—	March 14, 2010	Kitt Peak	Spacewatch	·	1.1 km	MPC · JPL
485085	2010 EC_{132}	—	March 15, 2010	Mount Lemmon	Mount Lemmon Survey	·	1.1 km	MPC · JPL
485086	2010 EM_{139}	—	March 13, 2010	La Sagra	OAM	·	1.5 km	MPC · JPL
485087	2010 EZ_{140}	—	February 16, 2010	Mount Lemmon	Mount Lemmon Survey	MAS	650 m	MPC · JPL
485088	2010 FZ_{5}	—	December 25, 2009	Kitt Peak	Spacewatch	ERI	2.2 km	MPC · JPL
485089	2010 FH_{15}	—	March 17, 2010	Kitt Peak	Spacewatch	·	1.8 km	MPC · JPL
485090	2010 FZ_{22}	—	February 16, 2010	Mount Lemmon	Mount Lemmon Survey	·	840 m	MPC · JPL
485091	2010 FZ_{53}	—	October 26, 2008	Kitt Peak	Spacewatch	·	1.0 km	MPC · JPL
485092	2010 FK_{88}	—	February 18, 2010	Mount Lemmon	Mount Lemmon Survey	·	1.3 km	MPC · JPL
485093	2010 FJ_{90}	—	March 20, 2010	Kitt Peak	Spacewatch	·	1.3 km	MPC · JPL
485094	2010 FJ_{94}	—	January 26, 2006	Mount Lemmon	Mount Lemmon Survey	·	1.1 km	MPC · JPL
485095	2010 FV_{94}	—	February 21, 2006	Mount Lemmon	Mount Lemmon Survey	MAS	590 m	MPC · JPL
485096	2010 GP_{30}	—	December 27, 2005	Kitt Peak	Spacewatch	NYS	730 m	MPC · JPL
485097	2010 GJ_{32}	—	April 7, 2010	La Sagra	OAM	·	2.3 km	MPC · JPL
485098	2010 GF_{42}	—	April 7, 2010	WISE	WISE	L5	10 km	MPC · JPL
485099	2010 GE_{66}	—	April 6, 2010	Catalina	CSS	·	1.2 km	MPC · JPL
485100	2010 GG_{97}	—	April 6, 2010	Kitt Peak	Spacewatch	PHO	850 m	MPC · JPL

== 485101–485200 ==
back to top

Designation			Discovery			Properties		Ref
Permanent	Provisional	Named after	Date	Site	Discoverer(s)	Category	Diam.	Ref
485101	2010 GE_{100}	—	April 4, 2010	Kitt Peak	Spacewatch	·	990 m	MPC · JPL
485102	2010 GT_{110}	—	April 9, 2010	Kitt Peak	Spacewatch	·	1.7 km	MPC · JPL
485103	2010 GX_{114}	—	April 10, 2010	Kitt Peak	Spacewatch	·	1.5 km	MPC · JPL
485104	2010 GN_{119}	—	April 11, 2010	Kitt Peak	Spacewatch	·	840 m	MPC · JPL
485105	2010 GY_{124}	—	April 7, 2010	Kitt Peak	Spacewatch	·	810 m	MPC · JPL
485106	2010 GL_{161}	—	April 10, 2010	Mount Lemmon	Mount Lemmon Survey	·	2.2 km	MPC · JPL
485107	2010 GK_{172}	—	April 29, 2003	Kitt Peak	Spacewatch	·	1.0 km	MPC · JPL
485108	2010 HL_{17}	—	April 18, 2010	WISE	WISE	·	3.2 km	MPC · JPL
485109	2010 HY_{107}	—	April 25, 2010	Kitt Peak	Spacewatch	·	950 m	MPC · JPL
485110	2010 HZ_{108}	—	April 25, 2010	WISE	WISE	APO	360 m	MPC · JPL
485111	2010 HY_{111}	—	June 18, 2010	Mount Lemmon	Mount Lemmon Survey	PHO	2.0 km	MPC · JPL
485112	2010 JE_{34}	—	April 14, 2010	Catalina	CSS	ERI	1.8 km	MPC · JPL
485113	2010 JY_{45}	—	May 7, 2010	Kitt Peak	Spacewatch	MAS	710 m	MPC · JPL
485114	2010 JJ_{82}	—	February 25, 2006	Kitt Peak	Spacewatch	·	1.1 km	MPC · JPL
485115	2010 JS_{119}	—	May 11, 2010	Mount Lemmon	Mount Lemmon Survey	·	770 m	MPC · JPL
485116	2010 JE_{124}	—	April 20, 2010	Siding Spring	SSS	·	1.1 km	MPC · JPL
485117	2010 JN_{154}	—	April 14, 2010	Kitt Peak	Spacewatch	·	1.2 km	MPC · JPL
485118	2010 KY_{7}	—	May 18, 2010	Kitt Peak	Spacewatch	·	4.0 km	MPC · JPL
485119	2010 KO_{57}	—	May 20, 2010	WISE	WISE	·	1.8 km	MPC · JPL
485120	2010 KY_{116}	—	May 30, 2010	WISE	WISE	·	2.0 km	MPC · JPL
485121	2010 KJ_{123}	—	May 31, 2010	WISE	WISE	·	2.6 km	MPC · JPL
485122	2010 LB_{13}	—	June 2, 2010	WISE	WISE	·	3.0 km	MPC · JPL
485123	2010 LT_{102}	—	June 13, 2010	WISE	WISE	·	2.8 km	MPC · JPL
485124	2010 LE_{105}	—	April 25, 2006	Mount Lemmon	Mount Lemmon Survey	MAS	640 m	MPC · JPL
485125	2010 LM_{109}	—	June 13, 2010	Westfield	R. Holmes, T. Vorobjov	·	2.1 km	MPC · JPL
485126	2010 MA_{46}	—	June 23, 2010	WISE	WISE	·	4.8 km	MPC · JPL
485127	2010 MA_{54}	—	June 16, 2010	WISE	WISE	·	3.0 km	MPC · JPL
485128	2010 MM_{61}	—	June 24, 2010	WISE	WISE	·	3.0 km	MPC · JPL
485129	2010 MS_{82}	—	May 8, 2005	Mount Lemmon	Mount Lemmon Survey	·	2.9 km	MPC · JPL
485130	2010 MK_{92}	—	June 28, 2010	WISE	WISE	·	4.1 km	MPC · JPL
485131	2010 MH_{97}	—	June 28, 2010	WISE	WISE	·	2.5 km	MPC · JPL
485132	2010 NH_{3}	—	July 12, 2010	La Sagra	OAM	H	670 m	MPC · JPL
485133	2010 NQ_{6}	—	June 17, 2010	Mount Lemmon	Mount Lemmon Survey	·	2.3 km	MPC · JPL
485134	2010 NA_{12}	—	July 5, 2010	WISE	WISE	·	3.4 km	MPC · JPL
485135	2010 NU_{69}	—	July 14, 2010	WISE	WISE	·	4.7 km	MPC · JPL
485136	2010 NY_{74}	—	December 10, 2005	Kitt Peak	Spacewatch	·	1.7 km	MPC · JPL
485137	2010 NY_{79}	—	July 15, 2010	WISE	WISE	·	2.2 km	MPC · JPL
485138	2010 OD	—	July 16, 2010	La Sagra	OAM	·	3.4 km	MPC · JPL
485139	2010 OO_{3}	—	January 31, 2009	Mount Lemmon	Mount Lemmon Survey	·	2.5 km	MPC · JPL
485140	2010 OC_{22}	—	July 18, 2010	WISE	WISE	·	3.3 km	MPC · JPL
485141	2010 OL_{22}	—	October 27, 2005	Mount Lemmon	Mount Lemmon Survey	·	2.9 km	MPC · JPL
485142	2010 OE_{27}	—	July 19, 2010	WISE	WISE	·	1.9 km	MPC · JPL
485143	2010 OP_{63}	—	July 24, 2010	WISE	WISE	LIX	3.2 km	MPC · JPL
485144	2010 OC_{99}	—	July 28, 2010	WISE	WISE	·	2.4 km	MPC · JPL
485145	2010 OK_{101}	—	July 20, 2010	La Sagra	OAM	·	1.4 km	MPC · JPL
485146	2010 OW_{118}	—	December 24, 2005	Kitt Peak	Spacewatch	·	2.5 km	MPC · JPL
485147	2010 PV_{23}	—	July 16, 2010	La Sagra	OAM	·	2.3 km	MPC · JPL
485148	2010 PF_{49}	—	August 7, 2010	WISE	WISE	·	2.2 km	MPC · JPL
485149	2010 PK_{60}	—	January 13, 2008	Kitt Peak	Spacewatch	·	2.3 km	MPC · JPL
485150	2010 PD_{62}	—	June 21, 2010	Mount Lemmon	Mount Lemmon Survey	·	1.6 km	MPC · JPL
485151	2010 PR_{63}	—	August 4, 2010	La Sagra	OAM	H	570 m	MPC · JPL
485152	2010 PQ_{65}	—	August 12, 2010	Andrushivka	Andrushivka	H	710 m	MPC · JPL
485153	2010 PV_{80}	—	December 29, 2008	Mount Lemmon	Mount Lemmon Survey	H	540 m	MPC · JPL
485154	2010 RC_{10}	—	September 2, 2010	Mount Lemmon	Mount Lemmon Survey	·	1.4 km	MPC · JPL
485155	2010 RL_{22}	—	September 3, 2010	Socorro	LINEAR	·	1.5 km	MPC · JPL
485156	2010 RM_{26}	—	October 20, 2006	Mount Lemmon	Mount Lemmon Survey	HOF	2.2 km	MPC · JPL
485157	2010 RR_{32}	—	August 16, 2010	La Sagra	OAM	H	410 m	MPC · JPL
485158	2010 RB_{37}	—	September 3, 2010	Socorro	LINEAR	H	470 m	MPC · JPL
485159	2010 RW_{54}	—	September 4, 2010	Kitt Peak	Spacewatch	H	600 m	MPC · JPL
485160	2010 RW_{57}	—	November 5, 2005	Mount Lemmon	Mount Lemmon Survey	·	2.0 km	MPC · JPL
485161	2010 RY_{69}	—	September 7, 2010	La Sagra	OAM	·	2.2 km	MPC · JPL
485162	2010 RT_{77}	—	September 6, 2010	La Sagra	OAM	·	2.5 km	MPC · JPL
485163	2010 RU_{96}	—	October 9, 1997	Xinglong	SCAP	H	590 m	MPC · JPL
485164	2010 RB_{99}	—	September 10, 2010	Kitt Peak	Spacewatch	·	1.9 km	MPC · JPL
485165	2010 RQ_{100}	—	September 10, 2010	Kitt Peak	Spacewatch	·	1.5 km	MPC · JPL
485166	2010 RA_{105}	—	August 31, 2005	Kitt Peak	Spacewatch	KOR	1.1 km	MPC · JPL
485167	2010 RF_{112}	—	September 11, 2010	Kitt Peak	Spacewatch	MRX	980 m	MPC · JPL
485168	2010 RX_{127}	—	September 7, 2010	La Sagra	OAM	·	2.1 km	MPC · JPL
485169	2010 RM_{128}	—	September 14, 2010	Kitt Peak	Spacewatch	·	2.9 km	MPC · JPL
485170	2010 RW_{144}	—	September 10, 2010	Kitt Peak	Spacewatch	EUN	1.3 km	MPC · JPL
485171	2010 RX_{165}	—	September 10, 2010	La Sagra	OAM	·	1.4 km	MPC · JPL
485172	2010 RK_{167}	—	September 6, 2010	La Sagra	OAM	·	2.4 km	MPC · JPL
485173	2010 RS_{177}	—	September 11, 2010	Kitt Peak	Spacewatch	WIT	900 m	MPC · JPL
485174	2010 RR_{180}	—	September 14, 2010	Kitt Peak	Spacewatch	·	1.7 km	MPC · JPL
485175	2010 RM_{184}	—	September 10, 2010	Mount Lemmon	Mount Lemmon Survey	·	1.6 km	MPC · JPL
485176	2010 SC_{9}	—	September 17, 2010	Mount Lemmon	Mount Lemmon Survey	·	1.5 km	MPC · JPL
485177	2010 SK_{23}	—	September 5, 2010	La Sagra	OAM	·	2.9 km	MPC · JPL
485178	2010 SJ_{29}	—	September 12, 2010	Kitt Peak	Spacewatch	GEF	1.2 km	MPC · JPL
485179	2010 SS_{35}	—	September 30, 2010	La Sagra	OAM	H	540 m	MPC · JPL
485180	2010 ST_{38}	—	April 1, 2009	Mount Lemmon	Mount Lemmon Survey	H	480 m	MPC · JPL
485181	2010 SR_{39}	—	September 10, 2010	Catalina	CSS	H	680 m	MPC · JPL
485182	2010 TB	—	September 10, 2010	Catalina	CSS	·	2.1 km	MPC · JPL
485183	2010 TW_{9}	—	October 1, 2010	Kitt Peak	Spacewatch	·	1.7 km	MPC · JPL
485184	2010 TM_{19}	—	October 8, 2010	La Sagra	OAM	·	2.9 km	MPC · JPL
485185	2010 TD_{28}	—	February 28, 2008	Mount Lemmon	Mount Lemmon Survey	AGN	1.0 km	MPC · JPL
485186	2010 TR_{29}	—	September 14, 2010	Kitt Peak	Spacewatch	·	1.5 km	MPC · JPL
485187	2010 TH_{39}	—	September 15, 2010	Kitt Peak	Spacewatch	H	510 m	MPC · JPL
485188	2010 TX_{45}	—	September 10, 2010	Kitt Peak	Spacewatch	KOR	1.2 km	MPC · JPL
485189	2010 TX_{60}	—	October 27, 2005	Mount Lemmon	Mount Lemmon Survey	·	1.2 km	MPC · JPL
485190	2010 TE_{65}	—	April 27, 2008	Kitt Peak	Spacewatch	·	2.1 km	MPC · JPL
485191	2010 TP_{79}	—	October 8, 2010	Kitt Peak	Spacewatch	·	1.3 km	MPC · JPL
485192	2010 TX_{87}	—	October 1, 2010	Mount Lemmon	Mount Lemmon Survey	·	1.4 km	MPC · JPL
485193	2010 TU_{89}	—	October 1, 2010	Mount Lemmon	Mount Lemmon Survey	·	1.5 km	MPC · JPL
485194	2010 TD_{126}	—	October 10, 2010	Mount Lemmon	Mount Lemmon Survey	HOF	2.3 km	MPC · JPL
485195	2010 TR_{153}	—	September 18, 2010	Mount Lemmon	Mount Lemmon Survey	·	1.6 km	MPC · JPL
485196	2010 TF_{157}	—	September 28, 2010	Kitt Peak	Spacewatch	·	1.7 km	MPC · JPL
485197	2010 TO_{165}	—	September 29, 2010	Mount Lemmon	Mount Lemmon Survey	TEL	1.2 km	MPC · JPL
485198	2010 TS_{168}	—	October 10, 2010	Socorro	LINEAR	·	3.6 km	MPC · JPL
485199	2010 TV_{184}	—	November 5, 1994	Kitt Peak	Spacewatch	·	2.2 km	MPC · JPL
485200	2010 UN_{19}	—	September 16, 2010	Mount Lemmon	Mount Lemmon Survey	·	2.9 km	MPC · JPL

== 485201–485300 ==
back to top

Designation			Discovery			Properties		Ref
Permanent	Provisional	Named after	Date	Site	Discoverer(s)	Category	Diam.	Ref
485201	2010 US_{25}	—	March 13, 2007	Mount Lemmon	Mount Lemmon Survey	·	2.8 km	MPC · JPL
485202	2010 UE_{35}	—	October 12, 2010	Mount Lemmon	Mount Lemmon Survey	EOS	1.4 km	MPC · JPL
485203	2010 UC_{36}	—	October 29, 2010	Mount Lemmon	Mount Lemmon Survey	TEL	1.4 km	MPC · JPL
485204	2010 UD_{49}	—	December 31, 2000	Kitt Peak	Spacewatch	·	2.9 km	MPC · JPL
485205	2010 UO_{55}	—	October 29, 2010	Kitt Peak	Spacewatch	·	2.0 km	MPC · JPL
485206	2010 UC_{59}	—	October 29, 2010	Kitt Peak	Spacewatch	·	2.4 km	MPC · JPL
485207	2010 UL_{73}	—	October 29, 2010	Mount Lemmon	Mount Lemmon Survey	URS	2.8 km	MPC · JPL
485208	2010 UR_{76}	—	November 29, 2005	Kitt Peak	Spacewatch	·	2.1 km	MPC · JPL
485209	2010 UR_{77}	—	August 6, 2010	WISE	WISE	·	2.6 km	MPC · JPL
485210	2010 UT_{77}	—	October 13, 2010	Mount Lemmon	Mount Lemmon Survey	·	1.6 km	MPC · JPL
485211	2010 UK_{79}	—	October 30, 2010	Mount Lemmon	Mount Lemmon Survey	·	1.8 km	MPC · JPL
485212	2010 UB_{80}	—	October 30, 2010	Mount Lemmon	Mount Lemmon Survey	·	1.8 km	MPC · JPL
485213	2010 UG_{83}	—	October 29, 2010	Mount Lemmon	Mount Lemmon Survey	WIT	990 m	MPC · JPL
485214	2010 UT_{85}	—	October 19, 2010	Mount Lemmon	Mount Lemmon Survey	·	1.6 km	MPC · JPL
485215	2010 UH_{88}	—	October 30, 2010	Catalina	CSS	·	2.5 km	MPC · JPL
485216	2010 UA_{95}	—	December 21, 2005	Catalina	CSS	·	2.3 km	MPC · JPL
485217	2010 UT_{97}	—	October 28, 2010	Mount Lemmon	Mount Lemmon Survey	·	2.3 km	MPC · JPL
485218	2010 UZ_{97}	—	October 17, 2010	Catalina	CSS	GEF	1.2 km	MPC · JPL
485219	2010 UJ_{99}	—	September 30, 2010	La Sagra	OAM	fast	3.6 km	MPC · JPL
485220	2010 VS	—	May 12, 2010	WISE	WISE	L5	10 km	MPC · JPL
485221	2010 VN_{11}	—	November 3, 2010	Kitt Peak	Spacewatch	T_{j} (2.98)	3.8 km	MPC · JPL
485222	2010 VO_{15}	—	December 1, 2005	Kitt Peak	Spacewatch	·	1.7 km	MPC · JPL
485223	2010 VC_{16}	—	October 12, 2010	Mount Lemmon	Mount Lemmon Survey	EOS	1.6 km	MPC · JPL
485224	2010 VN_{18}	—	November 2, 2010	Mount Lemmon	Mount Lemmon Survey	·	1.7 km	MPC · JPL
485225	2010 VQ_{19}	—	August 8, 2010	WISE	WISE	·	2.8 km	MPC · JPL
485226	2010 VU_{23}	—	October 28, 2010	Kitt Peak	Spacewatch	·	2.2 km	MPC · JPL
485227	2010 VZ_{24}	—	October 27, 2005	Mount Lemmon	Mount Lemmon Survey	·	2.0 km	MPC · JPL
485228	2010 VJ_{27}	—	November 1, 2010	Kitt Peak	Spacewatch	EOS	1.8 km	MPC · JPL
485229	2010 VL_{27}	—	September 17, 2010	Mount Lemmon	Mount Lemmon Survey	·	1.9 km	MPC · JPL
485230	2010 VE_{34}	—	November 4, 2010	La Sagra	OAM	·	2.7 km	MPC · JPL
485231	2010 VV_{44}	—	September 18, 2010	Mount Lemmon	Mount Lemmon Survey	·	1.5 km	MPC · JPL
485232	2010 VA_{48}	—	November 2, 2010	Kitt Peak	Spacewatch	EOS	1.5 km	MPC · JPL
485233	2010 VV_{49}	—	February 29, 2008	Kitt Peak	Spacewatch	·	1.9 km	MPC · JPL
485234	2010 VN_{55}	—	October 29, 2005	Mount Lemmon	Mount Lemmon Survey	·	1.5 km	MPC · JPL
485235	2010 VL_{61}	—	November 4, 2010	La Sagra	OAM	·	2.5 km	MPC · JPL
485236	2010 VR_{70}	—	October 29, 2010	Catalina	CSS	H	700 m	MPC · JPL
485237	2010 VU_{70}	—	October 29, 2010	Kitt Peak	Spacewatch	·	2.2 km	MPC · JPL
485238	2010 VR_{71}	—	September 18, 2010	Mount Lemmon	Mount Lemmon Survey	·	2.4 km	MPC · JPL
485239	2010 VK_{74}	—	November 14, 1999	Socorro	LINEAR	H	520 m	MPC · JPL
485240	2010 VO_{74}	—	July 27, 2010	WISE	WISE	·	3.1 km	MPC · JPL
485241	2010 VD_{84}	—	December 30, 2005	Kitt Peak	Spacewatch	·	2.0 km	MPC · JPL
485242	2010 VD_{89}	—	October 29, 2010	Kitt Peak	Spacewatch	EOS	2.0 km	MPC · JPL
485243	2010 VO_{89}	—	October 29, 2010	Kitt Peak	Spacewatch	·	2.3 km	MPC · JPL
485244	2010 VF_{91}	—	November 6, 2010	Kitt Peak	Spacewatch	(18466)	2.5 km	MPC · JPL
485245	2010 VZ_{106}	—	September 11, 2010	Mount Lemmon	Mount Lemmon Survey	·	2.4 km	MPC · JPL
485246	2010 VP_{114}	—	November 7, 2010	Kitt Peak	Spacewatch	HYG	2.2 km	MPC · JPL
485247	2010 VN_{116}	—	October 30, 2010	Kitt Peak	Spacewatch	·	2.9 km	MPC · JPL
485248	2010 VG_{123}	—	November 12, 2005	Kitt Peak	Spacewatch	·	2.0 km	MPC · JPL
485249	2010 VK_{123}	—	September 11, 2010	Mount Lemmon	Mount Lemmon Survey	HYG	2.2 km	MPC · JPL
485250	2010 VX_{136}	—	November 10, 2010	Kitt Peak	Spacewatch	T_{j} (2.96)	4.8 km	MPC · JPL
485251	2010 VB_{157}	—	November 8, 2010	Kitt Peak	Spacewatch	·	1.9 km	MPC · JPL
485252	2010 VC_{160}	—	November 6, 2005	Mount Lemmon	Mount Lemmon Survey	·	2.3 km	MPC · JPL
485253	2010 VO_{160}	—	October 29, 2010	Mount Lemmon	Mount Lemmon Survey	·	2.0 km	MPC · JPL
485254	2010 VV_{162}	—	November 30, 2005	Kitt Peak	Spacewatch	EOS	1.6 km	MPC · JPL
485255	2010 VX_{165}	—	November 10, 2010	Kitt Peak	Spacewatch	·	2.3 km	MPC · JPL
485256	2010 VC_{177}	—	September 3, 2010	Mount Lemmon	Mount Lemmon Survey	·	2.1 km	MPC · JPL
485257	2010 VY_{177}	—	September 11, 2010	Mount Lemmon	Mount Lemmon Survey	·	2.1 km	MPC · JPL
485258	2010 VO_{179}	—	November 1, 2010	Kitt Peak	Spacewatch	615	1.2 km	MPC · JPL
485259	2010 VK_{195}	—	October 9, 2004	Kitt Peak	Spacewatch	T_{j} (2.98)	3.9 km	MPC · JPL
485260	2010 VR_{196}	—	October 29, 2010	Mount Lemmon	Mount Lemmon Survey	·	2.6 km	MPC · JPL
485261	2010 VA_{197}	—	March 14, 2007	Kitt Peak	Spacewatch	·	2.3 km	MPC · JPL
485262	2010 VK_{204}	—	September 16, 2010	Mount Lemmon	Mount Lemmon Survey	·	1.5 km	MPC · JPL
485263	2010 VY_{214}	—	November 29, 2005	Mount Lemmon	Mount Lemmon Survey	·	1.4 km	MPC · JPL
485264	2010 VJ_{216}	—	October 14, 2010	Mount Lemmon	Mount Lemmon Survey	·	1.9 km	MPC · JPL
485265	2010 WO_{9}	—	November 14, 2010	Mount Lemmon	Mount Lemmon Survey	·	2.0 km	MPC · JPL
485266	2010 WN_{12}	—	November 16, 2010	Mount Lemmon	Mount Lemmon Survey	·	1.9 km	MPC · JPL
485267	2010 WK_{13}	—	September 5, 2010	Mount Lemmon	Mount Lemmon Survey	·	1.8 km	MPC · JPL
485268	2010 WM_{34}	—	November 8, 2010	Kitt Peak	Spacewatch	·	2.0 km	MPC · JPL
485269	2010 WC_{35}	—	January 5, 2006	Kitt Peak	Spacewatch	·	1.3 km	MPC · JPL
485270	2010 WN_{52}	—	November 6, 1999	Kitt Peak	Spacewatch	EOS	1.8 km	MPC · JPL
485271	2010 WH_{55}	—	November 5, 2010	Mount Lemmon	Mount Lemmon Survey	·	2.9 km	MPC · JPL
485272	2010 WD_{57}	—	April 14, 2008	Mount Lemmon	Mount Lemmon Survey	·	2.1 km	MPC · JPL
485273	2010 WA_{58}	—	November 13, 2010	Kitt Peak	Spacewatch	·	1.9 km	MPC · JPL
485274	2010 WN_{61}	—	December 30, 2005	Kitt Peak	Spacewatch	·	1.9 km	MPC · JPL
485275	2010 XD_{15}	—	January 8, 2006	Mount Lemmon	Mount Lemmon Survey	·	1.8 km	MPC · JPL
485276	2010 XD_{19}	—	October 8, 2004	Kitt Peak	Spacewatch	·	2.4 km	MPC · JPL
485277	2010 XR_{34}	—	October 31, 2010	Kitt Peak	Spacewatch	·	2.7 km	MPC · JPL
485278	2010 XF_{45}	—	December 18, 2001	Socorro	LINEAR	·	3.1 km	MPC · JPL
485279	2010 XM_{50}	—	November 5, 2010	Mount Lemmon	Mount Lemmon Survey	·	3.0 km	MPC · JPL
485280	2010 XW_{54}	—	December 8, 2010	Mount Lemmon	Mount Lemmon Survey	·	3.6 km	MPC · JPL
485281	2010 XY_{71}	—	January 4, 2006	Kitt Peak	Spacewatch	·	2.0 km	MPC · JPL
485282	2010 XO_{76}	—	September 15, 2009	Mount Lemmon	Mount Lemmon Survey	EOS	1.8 km	MPC · JPL
485283	2010 XK_{85}	—	November 13, 2010	Kitt Peak	Spacewatch	EOS	1.8 km	MPC · JPL
485284	2010 YQ_{1}	—	October 9, 2010	Kitt Peak	Spacewatch	·	4.2 km	MPC · JPL
485285	2010 YS_{3}	—	November 11, 2004	Catalina	CSS	T_{j} (2.95)	3.5 km	MPC · JPL
485286	2010 YB_{4}	—	December 29, 2010	Catalina	CSS	·	2.6 km	MPC · JPL
485287	2010 YD_{4}	—	December 9, 2010	Mount Lemmon	Mount Lemmon Survey	TIR	3.0 km	MPC · JPL
485288	2011 AK	—	January 2, 2011	Mayhill	L. Elenin	·	3.0 km	MPC · JPL
485289	2011 AE_{11}	—	December 3, 2010	Mount Lemmon	Mount Lemmon Survey	·	2.3 km	MPC · JPL
485290	2011 AN_{11}	—	November 1, 2010	Mount Lemmon	Mount Lemmon Survey	·	3.0 km	MPC · JPL
485291	2011 AT_{13}	—	January 5, 2011	Catalina	CSS	·	2.8 km	MPC · JPL
485292	2011 AN_{15}	—	November 15, 2010	Mount Lemmon	Mount Lemmon Survey	T_{j} (2.97)	3.3 km	MPC · JPL
485293	2011 AE_{22}	—	December 10, 2010	Mount Lemmon	Mount Lemmon Survey	·	2.8 km	MPC · JPL
485294	2011 AM_{29}	—	August 16, 2009	Kitt Peak	Spacewatch	·	2.6 km	MPC · JPL
485295	2011 AZ_{31}	—	December 4, 2010	Pla D'Arguines	R. Ferrando, M. Ferrando	·	3.2 km	MPC · JPL
485296	2011 AU_{42}	—	December 8, 2010	Mount Lemmon	Mount Lemmon Survey	·	2.6 km	MPC · JPL
485297	2011 AB_{43}	—	January 10, 2011	Kitt Peak	Spacewatch	·	2.3 km	MPC · JPL
485298	2011 AS_{43}	—	December 8, 2010	Mount Lemmon	Mount Lemmon Survey	·	3.3 km	MPC · JPL
485299	2011 AM_{47}	—	December 3, 2010	Mount Lemmon	Mount Lemmon Survey	·	2.5 km	MPC · JPL
485300	2011 AJ_{49}	—	February 3, 2000	Kitt Peak	Spacewatch	·	2.2 km	MPC · JPL

== 485301–485400 ==
back to top

Designation			Discovery			Properties		Ref
Permanent	Provisional	Named after	Date	Site	Discoverer(s)	Category	Diam.	Ref
485301	2011 AH_{50}	—	January 13, 2011	Mount Lemmon	Mount Lemmon Survey	HYG	2.3 km	MPC · JPL
485302	2011 AN_{51}	—	November 19, 2009	La Sagra	OAM	·	3.4 km	MPC · JPL
485303	2011 AG_{54}	—	January 3, 2011	Mount Lemmon	Mount Lemmon Survey	·	2.2 km	MPC · JPL
485304	2011 AD_{57}	—	January 11, 2011	Catalina	CSS	H	620 m	MPC · JPL
485305	2011 AA_{60}	—	July 28, 2008	Mount Lemmon	Mount Lemmon Survey	EOS	2.0 km	MPC · JPL
485306	2011 AF_{62}	—	January 5, 2011	Catalina	CSS	·	3.7 km	MPC · JPL
485307	2011 AB_{67}	—	January 3, 2011	Mount Lemmon	Mount Lemmon Survey	·	2.3 km	MPC · JPL
485308	2011 AX_{67}	—	January 17, 2010	WISE	WISE	·	2.5 km	MPC · JPL
485309	2011 AZ_{69}	—	September 19, 2003	Kitt Peak	Spacewatch	·	2.9 km	MPC · JPL
485310	2011 AP_{71}	—	January 14, 2011	Mount Lemmon	Mount Lemmon Survey	EOS	1.5 km	MPC · JPL
485311	2011 AM_{77}	—	December 14, 2010	Mount Lemmon	Mount Lemmon Survey	·	3.4 km	MPC · JPL
485312	2011 BP_{2}	—	July 27, 2009	Kitt Peak	Spacewatch	·	2.0 km	MPC · JPL
485313	2011 BZ_{3}	—	January 8, 2000	Kitt Peak	Spacewatch	·	2.4 km	MPC · JPL
485314	2011 BY_{7}	—	December 13, 2010	Mount Lemmon	Mount Lemmon Survey	HYG	2.0 km	MPC · JPL
485315	2011 BT_{17}	—	January 25, 2011	Kitt Peak	Spacewatch	·	2.5 km	MPC · JPL
485316	2011 BC_{30}	—	January 30, 2000	Kitt Peak	Spacewatch	·	2.7 km	MPC · JPL
485317	2011 BP_{31}	—	January 26, 2011	Mount Lemmon	Mount Lemmon Survey	·	2.8 km	MPC · JPL
485318	2011 BZ_{32}	—	January 27, 2011	Mount Lemmon	Mount Lemmon Survey	·	2.6 km	MPC · JPL
485319	2011 BL_{34}	—	December 13, 2010	Mount Lemmon	Mount Lemmon Survey	·	1.8 km	MPC · JPL
485320 Vértesernő	2011 BF_{44}	Vértesernő	January 30, 2011	Piszkéstető	S. Kürti, K. Sárneczky	·	3.3 km	MPC · JPL
485321	2011 BN_{53}	—	February 4, 2000	Kitt Peak	Spacewatch	THM	1.6 km	MPC · JPL
485322	2011 BA_{56}	—	December 5, 2010	Mount Lemmon	Mount Lemmon Survey	EOS	1.9 km	MPC · JPL
485323	2011 BA_{59}	—	January 30, 2011	Mount Lemmon	Mount Lemmon Survey	LIX	3.0 km	MPC · JPL
485324	2011 BD_{68}	—	January 20, 2010	WISE	WISE	TRE	2.2 km	MPC · JPL
485325	2011 BL_{68}	—	January 10, 2011	Mount Lemmon	Mount Lemmon Survey	·	3.1 km	MPC · JPL
485326	2011 BT_{68}	—	January 8, 2011	Mount Lemmon	Mount Lemmon Survey	·	3.1 km	MPC · JPL
485327	2011 BZ_{75}	—	January 29, 2011	Kitt Peak	Spacewatch	·	2.8 km	MPC · JPL
485328	2011 BE_{83}	—	January 11, 2011	Kitt Peak	Spacewatch	·	3.3 km	MPC · JPL
485329	2011 BJ_{83}	—	December 5, 2010	Mount Lemmon	Mount Lemmon Survey	·	3.3 km	MPC · JPL
485330	2011 BQ_{93}	—	January 28, 2011	Mount Lemmon	Mount Lemmon Survey	·	3.0 km	MPC · JPL
485331	2011 BC_{95}	—	January 29, 2010	WISE	WISE	·	2.8 km	MPC · JPL
485332	2011 BP_{102}	—	January 24, 2011	Mount Lemmon	Mount Lemmon Survey	·	2.4 km	MPC · JPL
485333	2011 BC_{113}	—	November 24, 2009	Kitt Peak	Spacewatch	·	2.5 km	MPC · JPL
485334	2011 BC_{116}	—	December 13, 2010	Mount Lemmon	Mount Lemmon Survey	·	4.1 km	MPC · JPL
485335	2011 BS_{118}	—	January 26, 2011	Mount Lemmon	Mount Lemmon Survey	LIX	3.0 km	MPC · JPL
485336	2011 BG_{121}	—	February 9, 2011	Kitt Peak	Spacewatch	·	3.0 km	MPC · JPL
485337	2011 BT_{125}	—	January 27, 2011	Mount Lemmon	Mount Lemmon Survey	·	2.5 km	MPC · JPL
485338	2011 BS_{134}	—	January 8, 2010	WISE	WISE	·	3.3 km	MPC · JPL
485339	2011 BO_{142}	—	May 2, 2001	Haleakala	NEAT	·	2.4 km	MPC · JPL
485340	2011 BV_{149}	—	September 30, 2003	Kitt Peak	Spacewatch	·	2.5 km	MPC · JPL
485341	2011 CO_{4}	—	February 4, 2011	Catalina	CSS	·	3.1 km	MPC · JPL
485342	2011 CB_{6}	—	February 4, 2011	Catalina	CSS	·	3.2 km	MPC · JPL
485343	2011 CU_{10}	—	December 9, 2010	Mount Lemmon	Mount Lemmon Survey	EOS	1.8 km	MPC · JPL
485344	2011 CE_{27}	—	January 27, 2011	Mount Lemmon	Mount Lemmon Survey	·	2.7 km	MPC · JPL
485345	2011 CY_{29}	—	January 28, 2011	Mount Lemmon	Mount Lemmon Survey	T_{j} (2.95)	3.5 km	MPC · JPL
485346	2011 CH_{30}	—	August 12, 2007	Kitt Peak	Spacewatch	·	2.7 km	MPC · JPL
485347	2011 CV_{34}	—	September 7, 2008	Mount Lemmon	Mount Lemmon Survey	·	3.2 km	MPC · JPL
485348	2011 CU_{35}	—	December 8, 2010	Mount Lemmon	Mount Lemmon Survey	LIX	3.0 km	MPC · JPL
485349	2011 CN_{39}	—	February 6, 2010	WISE	WISE	·	4.3 km	MPC · JPL
485350	2011 CZ_{41}	—	December 8, 2010	Mount Lemmon	Mount Lemmon Survey	·	2.8 km	MPC · JPL
485351	2011 CE_{43}	—	January 28, 2011	Mount Lemmon	Mount Lemmon Survey	·	2.9 km	MPC · JPL
485352	2011 CA_{44}	—	January 28, 2011	Mount Lemmon	Mount Lemmon Survey	·	2.3 km	MPC · JPL
485353	2011 CN_{45}	—	February 5, 2010	WISE	WISE	·	3.2 km	MPC · JPL
485354	2011 CW_{48}	—	November 25, 2009	Mount Lemmon	Mount Lemmon Survey	·	2.8 km	MPC · JPL
485355	2011 CC_{62}	—	September 23, 2008	Mount Lemmon	Mount Lemmon Survey	·	2.3 km	MPC · JPL
485356	2011 CY_{70}	—	September 23, 2008	Mount Lemmon	Mount Lemmon Survey	·	3.7 km	MPC · JPL
485357	2011 CJ_{71}	—	February 8, 2011	Catalina	CSS	H	870 m	MPC · JPL
485358	2011 CU_{77}	—	January 7, 2005	Socorro	LINEAR	·	2.6 km	MPC · JPL
485359	2011 CZ_{77}	—	February 10, 2011	Mount Lemmon	Mount Lemmon Survey	·	3.7 km	MPC · JPL
485360	2011 CZ_{85}	—	September 4, 2003	Kitt Peak	Spacewatch	·	2.8 km	MPC · JPL
485361	2011 CQ_{90}	—	February 12, 2011	Mount Lemmon	Mount Lemmon Survey	·	2.9 km	MPC · JPL
485362	2011 CY_{102}	—	February 10, 2011	Mount Lemmon	Mount Lemmon Survey	·	2.8 km	MPC · JPL
485363	2011 CV_{107}	—	February 25, 2011	Mount Lemmon	Mount Lemmon Survey	·	2.6 km	MPC · JPL
485364	2011 CF_{113}	—	March 6, 2011	Mount Lemmon	Mount Lemmon Survey	·	2.6 km	MPC · JPL
485365	2011 DF_{13}	—	February 8, 2011	Mount Lemmon	Mount Lemmon Survey	·	2.9 km	MPC · JPL
485366	2011 DE_{18}	—	March 9, 2005	Mount Lemmon	Mount Lemmon Survey	CYB	2.7 km	MPC · JPL
485367	2011 DW_{26}	—	February 10, 2011	Mount Lemmon	Mount Lemmon Survey	·	3.1 km	MPC · JPL
485368	2011 ER_{2}	—	January 28, 2011	Mount Lemmon	Mount Lemmon Survey	VER	2.3 km	MPC · JPL
485369	2011 EX_{2}	—	March 1, 2011	Mount Lemmon	Mount Lemmon Survey	THB	2.2 km	MPC · JPL
485370	2011 EK_{10}	—	February 10, 2011	Mount Lemmon	Mount Lemmon Survey	·	3.3 km	MPC · JPL
485371	2011 EJ_{12}	—	January 27, 2011	Kitt Peak	Spacewatch	·	2.8 km	MPC · JPL
485372	2011 ED_{14}	—	March 13, 2005	Kitt Peak	Spacewatch	·	3.1 km	MPC · JPL
485373	2011 EG_{24}	—	March 24, 2006	Mount Lemmon	Mount Lemmon Survey	·	1.3 km	MPC · JPL
485374	2011 EN_{30}	—	January 16, 2005	Kitt Peak	Spacewatch	·	5.0 km	MPC · JPL
485375	2011 EU_{74}	—	January 8, 2011	Catalina	CSS	·	2.9 km	MPC · JPL
485376	2011 EJ_{80}	—	January 31, 2006	Kitt Peak	Spacewatch	·	3.0 km	MPC · JPL
485377	2011 FS_{21}	—	February 17, 2010	WISE	WISE	·	3.4 km	MPC · JPL
485378	2011 FO_{53}	—	March 15, 2008	Mount Lemmon	Mount Lemmon Survey	·	670 m	MPC · JPL
485379	2011 FO_{56}	—	July 8, 2005	Kitt Peak	Spacewatch	·	680 m	MPC · JPL
485380	2011 FY_{71}	—	March 9, 2005	Socorro	LINEAR	CYB	3.6 km	MPC · JPL
485381	2011 GK_{24}	—	April 4, 2011	Mount Lemmon	Mount Lemmon Survey	·	830 m	MPC · JPL
485382	2011 GT_{66}	—	January 16, 2011	Mount Lemmon	Mount Lemmon Survey	·	950 m	MPC · JPL
485383	2011 GB_{85}	—	April 2, 2011	Kitt Peak	Spacewatch	·	490 m	MPC · JPL
485384	2011 HZ_{19}	—	April 1, 2011	Kitt Peak	Spacewatch	·	540 m	MPC · JPL
485385	2011 HM_{69}	—	March 13, 2011	Mount Lemmon	Mount Lemmon Survey	·	740 m	MPC · JPL
485386	2011 JA_{17}	—	April 27, 2011	Haleakala	Pan-STARRS 1	·	720 m	MPC · JPL
485387	2011 JS_{26}	—	July 1, 2008	Kitt Peak	Spacewatch	·	680 m	MPC · JPL
485388	2011 KL_{2}	—	May 21, 2011	Haleakala	Pan-STARRS 1	·	940 m	MPC · JPL
485389	2011 KT_{6}	—	May 21, 2011	Haleakala	Pan-STARRS 1	·	730 m	MPC · JPL
485390	2011 KN_{27}	—	May 13, 2011	Mount Lemmon	Mount Lemmon Survey	·	840 m	MPC · JPL
485391	2011 KZ_{30}	—	May 24, 2011	Mount Lemmon	Mount Lemmon Survey	·	570 m	MPC · JPL
485392	2011 KM_{31}	—	July 30, 2008	Catalina	CSS	·	840 m	MPC · JPL
485393	2011 KC_{32}	—	May 30, 2011	Haleakala	Pan-STARRS 1	3:2	5.4 km	MPC · JPL
485394	2011 KN_{42}	—	April 30, 2011	Mount Lemmon	Mount Lemmon Survey	·	590 m	MPC · JPL
485395	2011 KA_{48}	—	June 1, 2008	Mount Lemmon	Mount Lemmon Survey	·	580 m	MPC · JPL
485396	2011 LV_{2}	—	June 3, 2011	Mount Lemmon	Mount Lemmon Survey	L5	8.1 km	MPC · JPL
485397	2011 LS_{19}	—	May 28, 2011	Mount Lemmon	Mount Lemmon Survey	·	1.8 km	MPC · JPL
485398	2011 LN_{20}	—	December 31, 2007	Mount Lemmon	Mount Lemmon Survey	·	1.4 km	MPC · JPL
485399	2011 MU_{7}	—	June 23, 2011	Kitt Peak	Spacewatch	·	1.5 km	MPC · JPL
485400	2011 NR	—	October 7, 2008	Mount Lemmon	Mount Lemmon Survey	·	650 m	MPC · JPL

== 485401–485500 ==
back to top

Designation			Discovery			Properties		Ref
Permanent	Provisional	Named after	Date	Site	Discoverer(s)	Category	Diam.	Ref
485401	2011 NL_{1}	—	May 14, 2011	Mount Lemmon	Mount Lemmon Survey	PHO	1.1 km	MPC · JPL
485402	2011 NY_{1}	—	July 5, 2011	Haleakala	Pan-STARRS 1	·	1.0 km	MPC · JPL
485403	2011 NF_{2}	—	June 3, 2011	Mount Lemmon	Mount Lemmon Survey	·	680 m	MPC · JPL
485404	2011 OO_{1}	—	July 22, 2011	Haleakala	Pan-STARRS 1	·	1.2 km	MPC · JPL
485405	2011 OB_{2}	—	July 22, 2011	Haleakala	Pan-STARRS 1	PHO	920 m	MPC · JPL
485406	2011 OL_{3}	—	June 12, 2011	Mount Lemmon	Mount Lemmon Survey	·	750 m	MPC · JPL
485407	2011 OW_{6}	—	July 26, 2011	Haleakala	Pan-STARRS 1	·	1.0 km	MPC · JPL
485408	2011 OG_{8}	—	July 26, 2011	Haleakala	Pan-STARRS 1	MAS	790 m	MPC · JPL
485409	2011 OS_{23}	—	November 3, 2005	Kitt Peak	Spacewatch	·	670 m	MPC · JPL
485410	2011 OV_{27}	—	July 28, 2011	Haleakala	Pan-STARRS 1	·	1.2 km	MPC · JPL
485411	2011 OW_{34}	—	July 28, 2011	Haleakala	Pan-STARRS 1	·	1.2 km	MPC · JPL
485412	2011 OP_{56}	—	July 27, 2011	Haleakala	Pan-STARRS 1	L5	10 km	MPC · JPL
485413	2011 OC_{60}	—	January 31, 2016	Haleakala	Pan-STARRS 1	L5	9.4 km	MPC · JPL
485414	2011 OD_{60}	—	December 18, 2004	Mount Lemmon	Mount Lemmon Survey	L5	7.3 km	MPC · JPL
485415	2011 OF_{60}	—	December 6, 2015	Mount Lemmon	Mount Lemmon Survey	L5	8.0 km	MPC · JPL
485416	2011 OJ_{60}	—	January 26, 2006	Mount Lemmon	Mount Lemmon Survey	L5	7.6 km	MPC · JPL
485417	2011 OK_{60}	—	July 27, 2011	Haleakala	Pan-STARRS 1	L5	10 km	MPC · JPL
485418	2011 OL_{60}	—	September 21, 2012	Mount Lemmon	Mount Lemmon Survey	L5	6.9 km	MPC · JPL
485419	2011 PM_{8}	—	July 31, 2011	Haleakala	Pan-STARRS 1	·	790 m	MPC · JPL
485420	2011 PO_{9}	—	August 9, 2011	Haleakala	Pan-STARRS 1	PHO	770 m	MPC · JPL
485421	2011 QG	—	August 18, 2011	Haleakala	Pan-STARRS 1	L5	9.4 km	MPC · JPL
485422	2011 QH_{3}	—	August 2, 2011	Haleakala	Pan-STARRS 1	L5	10 km	MPC · JPL
485423	2011 QO_{5}	—	August 2, 2011	Haleakala	Pan-STARRS 1	L5	10 km	MPC · JPL
485424	2011 QU_{14}	—	August 23, 2011	Haleakala	Pan-STARRS 1	·	1.2 km	MPC · JPL
485425	2011 QS_{16}	—	August 20, 2011	Haleakala	Pan-STARRS 1	·	1.1 km	MPC · JPL
485426	2011 QD_{22}	—	August 8, 2004	Socorro	LINEAR	·	700 m	MPC · JPL
485427	2011 QF_{22}	—	August 23, 2011	Socorro	LINEAR	·	1.8 km	MPC · JPL
485428	2011 QY_{25}	—	August 20, 2011	Haleakala	Pan-STARRS 1	·	1.2 km	MPC · JPL
485429	2011 QP_{31}	—	May 30, 2010	WISE	WISE	·	2.4 km	MPC · JPL
485430	2011 QR_{41}	—	August 24, 2011	La Sagra	OAM	MAS	820 m	MPC · JPL
485431	2011 QZ_{49}	—	August 18, 2011	Haleakala	Pan-STARRS 1	L5	10 km	MPC · JPL
485432	2011 QP_{51}	—	November 14, 2007	Catalina	CSS	·	1.7 km	MPC · JPL
485433	2011 QW_{54}	—	August 30, 2011	Haleakala	Pan-STARRS 1	V	670 m	MPC · JPL
485434	2011 QG_{55}	—	August 30, 2011	Haleakala	Pan-STARRS 1	·	790 m	MPC · JPL
485435	2011 QG_{56}	—	August 26, 2011	La Sagra	OAM	·	2.1 km	MPC · JPL
485436	2011 QO_{58}	—	August 27, 2011	Haleakala	Pan-STARRS 1	·	1.5 km	MPC · JPL
485437	2011 QS_{60}	—	August 31, 2011	Haleakala	Pan-STARRS 1	V	680 m	MPC · JPL
485438	2011 QC_{63}	—	August 30, 2011	La Sagra	OAM	·	1.4 km	MPC · JPL
485439	2011 QQ_{64}	—	February 25, 2006	Mount Lemmon	Mount Lemmon Survey	L5	9.4 km	MPC · JPL
485440	2011 QH_{65}	—	August 23, 2011	Haleakala	Pan-STARRS 1	·	1.4 km	MPC · JPL
485441	2011 QY_{66}	—	August 27, 2011	La Sagra	OAM	·	1.3 km	MPC · JPL
485442	2011 QF_{69}	—	August 23, 2011	Haleakala	Pan-STARRS 1	·	1.5 km	MPC · JPL
485443	2011 QO_{71}	—	August 28, 2011	Haleakala	Pan-STARRS 1	·	1.2 km	MPC · JPL
485444	2011 QS_{71}	—	August 28, 2011	La Sagra	OAM	V	760 m	MPC · JPL
485445	2011 QS_{80}	—	August 24, 2011	Haleakala	Pan-STARRS 1	·	1.3 km	MPC · JPL
485446	2011 QS_{85}	—	September 25, 1998	Xinglong	SCAP	·	1.2 km	MPC · JPL
485447	2011 QL_{88}	—	August 27, 2011	Haleakala	Pan-STARRS 1	·	1.6 km	MPC · JPL
485448	2011 QS_{88}	—	August 27, 2011	Haleakala	Pan-STARRS 1	·	970 m	MPC · JPL
485449	2011 QD_{90}	—	February 9, 2005	Mount Lemmon	Mount Lemmon Survey	L5	8.3 km	MPC · JPL
485450	2011 QB_{95}	—	July 22, 2011	Haleakala	Pan-STARRS 1	V	830 m	MPC · JPL
485451	2011 QH_{99}	—	November 20, 2014	Haleakala	Pan-STARRS 1	L5	7.4 km	MPC · JPL
485452	2011 QJ_{99}	—	February 2, 2006	Kitt Peak	Spacewatch	L5	7.9 km	MPC · JPL
485453	2011 RK_{2}	—	September 2, 2011	Haleakala	Pan-STARRS 1	V	630 m	MPC · JPL
485454	2011 RQ_{2}	—	February 19, 2010	Kitt Peak	Spacewatch	·	1.0 km	MPC · JPL
485455	2011 RJ_{3}	—	August 20, 2011	Haleakala	Pan-STARRS 1	NYS	1.0 km	MPC · JPL
485456	2011 RO_{3}	—	September 5, 2011	Haleakala	Pan-STARRS 1	L5	8.2 km	MPC · JPL
485457	2011 RX_{3}	—	September 5, 2011	Haleakala	Pan-STARRS 1	·	2.4 km	MPC · JPL
485458	2011 RV_{7}	—	September 10, 2007	Kitt Peak	Spacewatch	·	760 m	MPC · JPL
485459	2011 RF_{11}	—	September 4, 2011	Haleakala	Pan-STARRS 1	·	1.5 km	MPC · JPL
485460	2011 RX_{13}	—	September 2, 2011	Haleakala	Pan-STARRS 1	·	1.3 km	MPC · JPL
485461	2011 RH_{16}	—	August 11, 2011	Haleakala	Pan-STARRS 1	·	1.8 km	MPC · JPL
485462	2011 RF_{18}	—	September 4, 2011	Haleakala	Pan-STARRS 1	·	1.3 km	MPC · JPL
485463	2011 RK_{18}	—	September 7, 2011	Kitt Peak	Spacewatch	·	1.1 km	MPC · JPL
485464	2011 SD_{2}	—	October 26, 2008	Kitt Peak	Spacewatch	V	630 m	MPC · JPL
485465	2011 SZ_{2}	—	September 10, 2007	Mount Lemmon	Mount Lemmon Survey	·	1 km	MPC · JPL
485466	2011 SL_{11}	—	December 17, 2003	Anderson Mesa	LONEOS	·	1.5 km	MPC · JPL
485467	2011 SD_{22}	—	August 30, 2011	Haleakala	Pan-STARRS 1	·	1.1 km	MPC · JPL
485468	2011 SY_{22}	—	December 30, 2007	Catalina	CSS	·	1.6 km	MPC · JPL
485469	2011 SO_{37}	—	September 20, 2011	Kitt Peak	Spacewatch	·	1.4 km	MPC · JPL
485470	2011 SC_{39}	—	September 5, 2011	La Sagra	OAM	V	850 m	MPC · JPL
485471	2011 SK_{48}	—	September 20, 2011	Mount Lemmon	Mount Lemmon Survey	V	500 m	MPC · JPL
485472	2011 SP_{57}	—	September 23, 2011	Mount Lemmon	Mount Lemmon Survey	·	1.2 km	MPC · JPL
485473	2011 SD_{58}	—	September 21, 2011	Haleakala	Pan-STARRS 1	EUN	1.1 km	MPC · JPL
485474	2011 SL_{59}	—	March 18, 2010	Mount Lemmon	Mount Lemmon Survey	CLA	1.3 km	MPC · JPL
485475	2011 SF_{61}	—	June 8, 2011	Haleakala	Pan-STARRS 1	·	1.5 km	MPC · JPL
485476	2011 SV_{62}	—	December 28, 2003	Socorro	LINEAR	·	1.3 km	MPC · JPL
485477	2011 SK_{65}	—	September 18, 2007	Mount Lemmon	Mount Lemmon Survey	·	1.3 km	MPC · JPL
485478	2011 SY_{70}	—	September 4, 2011	Haleakala	Pan-STARRS 1	ADE	1.9 km	MPC · JPL
485479	2011 SQ_{71}	—	September 24, 2011	Haleakala	Pan-STARRS 1	L5	8.9 km	MPC · JPL
485480	2011 SY_{86}	—	September 22, 2011	Kitt Peak	Spacewatch	·	970 m	MPC · JPL
485481	2011 SL_{87}	—	September 22, 2011	Kitt Peak	Spacewatch	·	1.1 km	MPC · JPL
485482	2011 SG_{89}	—	September 22, 2011	Kitt Peak	Spacewatch	EUN	1.1 km	MPC · JPL
485483	2011 SM_{92}	—	November 5, 2007	Kitt Peak	Spacewatch	·	1.4 km	MPC · JPL
485484	2011 SB_{107}	—	September 20, 2011	Kitt Peak	Spacewatch	·	1.4 km	MPC · JPL
485485	2011 SK_{107}	—	September 24, 2011	Mount Lemmon	Mount Lemmon Survey	·	1.8 km	MPC · JPL
485486	2011 SB_{117}	—	February 11, 2004	Kitt Peak	Spacewatch	·	1.2 km	MPC · JPL
485487	2011 SA_{130}	—	February 1, 2005	Kitt Peak	Spacewatch	·	900 m	MPC · JPL
485488	2011 SX_{130}	—	January 18, 2004	Kitt Peak	Spacewatch	·	1.1 km	MPC · JPL
485489	2011 SN_{138}	—	October 8, 2004	Kitt Peak	Spacewatch	·	850 m	MPC · JPL
485490	2011 SU_{169}	—	September 15, 2007	Mount Lemmon	Mount Lemmon Survey	(5)	950 m	MPC · JPL
485491	2011 SY_{173}	—	July 22, 2010	WISE	WISE	·	2.5 km	MPC · JPL
485492	2011 SO_{174}	—	June 9, 2011	Mount Lemmon	Mount Lemmon Survey	·	1.4 km	MPC · JPL
485493	2011 SR_{181}	—	December 4, 2007	Mount Lemmon	Mount Lemmon Survey	·	1.3 km	MPC · JPL
485494	2011 SK_{188}	—	September 22, 2011	Kitt Peak	Spacewatch	·	1.3 km	MPC · JPL
485495	2011 SC_{192}	—	September 24, 2011	Catalina	CSS	·	1.4 km	MPC · JPL
485496	2011 SQ_{193}	—	September 26, 2011	Haleakala	Pan-STARRS 1	NYS	1.1 km	MPC · JPL
485497	2011 SH_{202}	—	April 18, 2009	Mount Lemmon	Mount Lemmon Survey	·	1.9 km	MPC · JPL
485498	2011 SX_{210}	—	September 21, 2011	Mount Lemmon	Mount Lemmon Survey	SUL	1.8 km	MPC · JPL
485499	2011 SY_{213}	—	August 27, 2011	Haleakala	Pan-STARRS 1	·	1.3 km	MPC · JPL
485500	2011 SY_{215}	—	October 1, 2002	Anderson Mesa	LONEOS	·	1.7 km	MPC · JPL

== 485501–485600 ==
back to top

Designation			Discovery			Properties		Ref
Permanent	Provisional	Named after	Date	Site	Discoverer(s)	Category	Diam.	Ref
485501	2011 SQ_{230}	—	September 4, 2011	Haleakala	Pan-STARRS 1	·	900 m	MPC · JPL
485502	2011 SQ_{232}	—	January 30, 2000	Kitt Peak	Spacewatch	·	1.1 km	MPC · JPL
485503	2011 ST_{233}	—	November 11, 2006	Mount Lemmon	Mount Lemmon Survey	·	2.0 km	MPC · JPL
485504	2011 SX_{242}	—	September 26, 2011	Haleakala	Pan-STARRS 1	·	740 m	MPC · JPL
485505	2011 SY_{254}	—	August 27, 2011	Haleakala	Pan-STARRS 1	·	2.3 km	MPC · JPL
485506	2011 SV_{260}	—	September 19, 2011	Haleakala	Pan-STARRS 1	·	1.9 km	MPC · JPL
485507	2011 SY_{265}	—	August 30, 2011	Haleakala	Pan-STARRS 1	L5	8.3 km	MPC · JPL
485508	2011 SA_{267}	—	December 13, 2007	Socorro	LINEAR	·	1.4 km	MPC · JPL
485509	2011 SA_{270}	—	September 20, 2011	Haleakala	Pan-STARRS 1	·	1.8 km	MPC · JPL
485510	2011 SJ_{275}	—	January 26, 1992	Kitt Peak	Spacewatch	·	1.7 km	MPC · JPL
485511	2011 TM_{6}	—	October 22, 2003	Kitt Peak	Spacewatch	·	850 m	MPC · JPL
485512	2011 TB_{10}	—	September 11, 2007	Kitt Peak	Spacewatch	·	1.4 km	MPC · JPL
485513	2011 TE_{13}	—	September 21, 2011	Catalina	CSS	·	1.8 km	MPC · JPL
485514	2011 TY_{15}	—	June 28, 2011	Mount Lemmon	Mount Lemmon Survey	·	2.0 km	MPC · JPL
485515	2011 UG_{7}	—	December 14, 2007	Kitt Peak	Spacewatch	·	1.1 km	MPC · JPL
485516	2011 UG_{9}	—	October 18, 2011	Mount Lemmon	Mount Lemmon Survey	·	1.4 km	MPC · JPL
485517	2011 UJ_{11}	—	October 14, 2007	Catalina	CSS	·	1.1 km	MPC · JPL
485518	2011 UZ_{12}	—	September 23, 2011	Kitt Peak	Spacewatch	·	1.0 km	MPC · JPL
485519	2011 UC_{17}	—	October 24, 2007	Mount Lemmon	Mount Lemmon Survey	·	1.4 km	MPC · JPL
485520	2011 UF_{24}	—	September 21, 2011	Mount Lemmon	Mount Lemmon Survey	·	1.6 km	MPC · JPL
485521	2011 UB_{30}	—	October 18, 2011	Mount Lemmon	Mount Lemmon Survey	·	1.5 km	MPC · JPL
485522	2011 UU_{30}	—	October 18, 2011	Mount Lemmon	Mount Lemmon Survey	·	1.8 km	MPC · JPL
485523	2011 UY_{30}	—	October 18, 2011	Mount Lemmon	Mount Lemmon Survey	·	2.2 km	MPC · JPL
485524	2011 UJ_{31}	—	December 4, 2007	Catalina	CSS	·	1.5 km	MPC · JPL
485525	2011 UU_{32}	—	September 27, 2011	Mount Lemmon	Mount Lemmon Survey	·	1.4 km	MPC · JPL
485526	2011 UZ_{35}	—	October 9, 2002	Socorro	LINEAR	·	1.3 km	MPC · JPL
485527	2011 UV_{36}	—	October 19, 2011	Mount Lemmon	Mount Lemmon Survey	·	1.4 km	MPC · JPL
485528	2011 UU_{38}	—	October 20, 2011	Mount Lemmon	Mount Lemmon Survey	NEM	1.7 km	MPC · JPL
485529	2011 UL_{45}	—	September 24, 2011	Haleakala	Pan-STARRS 1	·	970 m	MPC · JPL
485530	2011 UX_{45}	—	October 17, 1998	Anderson Mesa	LONEOS	·	1.5 km	MPC · JPL
485531	2011 UX_{50}	—	October 18, 2011	Kitt Peak	Spacewatch	·	1.4 km	MPC · JPL
485532	2011 UW_{51}	—	October 18, 2011	Kitt Peak	Spacewatch	·	1.2 km	MPC · JPL
485533	2011 UX_{53}	—	September 25, 2007	Mount Lemmon	Mount Lemmon Survey	PHO	1.2 km	MPC · JPL
485534	2011 UH_{54}	—	September 27, 2011	Mount Lemmon	Mount Lemmon Survey	·	1.4 km	MPC · JPL
485535	2011 UW_{61}	—	October 21, 2011	Mount Lemmon	Mount Lemmon Survey	EUN	1.0 km	MPC · JPL
485536	2011 UO_{62}	—	October 21, 2011	Socorro	LINEAR	·	1.6 km	MPC · JPL
485537	2011 UW_{66}	—	October 20, 2011	Mount Lemmon	Mount Lemmon Survey	·	1.3 km	MPC · JPL
485538	2011 UK_{72}	—	October 18, 2011	Kitt Peak	Spacewatch	·	1.2 km	MPC · JPL
485539	2011 UP_{84}	—	November 18, 2007	Mount Lemmon	Mount Lemmon Survey	·	1.2 km	MPC · JPL
485540	2011 UM_{85}	—	December 16, 2007	Kitt Peak	Spacewatch	·	1.4 km	MPC · JPL
485541	2011 UF_{89}	—	October 21, 2011	Mount Lemmon	Mount Lemmon Survey	·	1.7 km	MPC · JPL
485542	2011 UL_{93}	—	March 4, 2000	Socorro	LINEAR	·	1.6 km	MPC · JPL
485543	2011 UP_{104}	—	September 14, 2007	Mount Lemmon	Mount Lemmon Survey	·	890 m	MPC · JPL
485544	2011 US_{109}	—	October 18, 2011	Kitt Peak	Spacewatch	·	1.3 km	MPC · JPL
485545	2011 UG_{111}	—	August 30, 2002	Socorro	LINEAR	·	2.2 km	MPC · JPL
485546	2011 UM_{112}	—	September 24, 2011	Mount Lemmon	Mount Lemmon Survey	·	1.3 km	MPC · JPL
485547	2011 UK_{113}	—	September 27, 2011	Mount Lemmon	Mount Lemmon Survey	·	1.8 km	MPC · JPL
485548	2011 UR_{114}	—	October 24, 2011	Mount Lemmon	Mount Lemmon Survey	·	2.4 km	MPC · JPL
485549	2011 UY_{120}	—	June 11, 2011	Haleakala	Pan-STARRS 1	PHO	930 m	MPC · JPL
485550	2011 UH_{123}	—	September 6, 2011	La Sagra	OAM	·	1.5 km	MPC · JPL
485551	2011 UW_{125}	—	September 26, 2011	La Sagra	OAM	·	2.0 km	MPC · JPL
485552	2011 UF_{128}	—	September 25, 2011	Haleakala	Pan-STARRS 1	·	1.2 km	MPC · JPL
485553	2011 UW_{133}	—	October 24, 2011	Haleakala	Pan-STARRS 1	·	1.4 km	MPC · JPL
485554	2011 UY_{140}	—	December 15, 2007	Kitt Peak	Spacewatch	·	1.3 km	MPC · JPL
485555	2011 UJ_{143}	—	October 23, 2011	Haleakala	Pan-STARRS 1	·	1.3 km	MPC · JPL
485556	2011 UT_{143}	—	September 23, 2011	Catalina	CSS	GEF	1.3 km	MPC · JPL
485557	2011 UW_{143}	—	October 23, 2011	Kitt Peak	Spacewatch	·	1.8 km	MPC · JPL
485558	2011 UZ_{144}	—	October 18, 2011	Catalina	CSS	EUN	1.3 km	MPC · JPL
485559	2011 UD_{145}	—	October 24, 2011	Kitt Peak	Spacewatch	·	1.3 km	MPC · JPL
485560	2011 UT_{159}	—	January 13, 2008	Catalina	CSS	·	1.4 km	MPC · JPL
485561	2011 UW_{162}	—	September 29, 2011	Mount Lemmon	Mount Lemmon Survey	EUN	1.1 km	MPC · JPL
485562	2011 UA_{163}	—	October 24, 2011	Haleakala	Pan-STARRS 1	·	2.0 km	MPC · JPL
485563	2011 UQ_{164}	—	October 25, 2011	Haleakala	Pan-STARRS 1	·	3.0 km	MPC · JPL
485564	2011 UN_{166}	—	February 3, 2008	Mount Lemmon	Mount Lemmon Survey	·	1.7 km	MPC · JPL
485565	2011 UQ_{168}	—	October 15, 2007	Kitt Peak	Spacewatch	·	810 m	MPC · JPL
485566	2011 US_{172}	—	November 19, 2007	Mount Lemmon	Mount Lemmon Survey	·	1.4 km	MPC · JPL
485567	2011 UZ_{172}	—	September 23, 2011	Kitt Peak	Spacewatch	ADE	1.9 km	MPC · JPL
485568	2011 UR_{175}	—	October 24, 2011	Kitt Peak	Spacewatch	·	1.6 km	MPC · JPL
485569	2011 UO_{176}	—	October 24, 2011	Kitt Peak	Spacewatch	·	1.2 km	MPC · JPL
485570	2011 US_{177}	—	October 24, 2011	Kitt Peak	Spacewatch	·	1.5 km	MPC · JPL
485571	2011 UX_{182}	—	October 25, 2011	Haleakala	Pan-STARRS 1	MAR	1.1 km	MPC · JPL
485572	2011 UH_{183}	—	October 25, 2011	Haleakala	Pan-STARRS 1	·	1.1 km	MPC · JPL
485573	2011 UK_{186}	—	October 25, 2011	Haleakala	Pan-STARRS 1	(5)	1.2 km	MPC · JPL
485574	2011 UW_{186}	—	October 25, 2011	Haleakala	Pan-STARRS 1	·	1.4 km	MPC · JPL
485575	2011 UB_{189}	—	October 20, 2011	Mount Lemmon	Mount Lemmon Survey	·	1.2 km	MPC · JPL
485576	2011 UK_{193}	—	October 18, 2011	Haleakala	Pan-STARRS 1	EUN	1.5 km	MPC · JPL
485577	2011 UV_{196}	—	October 21, 2011	Kitt Peak	Spacewatch	·	1.4 km	MPC · JPL
485578	2011 UB_{199}	—	October 25, 2011	Kitt Peak	Spacewatch	·	1.4 km	MPC · JPL
485579	2011 UF_{199}	—	October 25, 2011	Haleakala	Pan-STARRS 1	MAR	1.3 km	MPC · JPL
485580	2011 UD_{200}	—	October 25, 2011	Kitt Peak	Spacewatch	·	2.3 km	MPC · JPL
485581	2011 UO_{200}	—	October 25, 2011	Haleakala	Pan-STARRS 1	·	1.5 km	MPC · JPL
485582	2011 UT_{201}	—	October 19, 2011	Mount Lemmon	Mount Lemmon Survey	·	1.2 km	MPC · JPL
485583	2011 UQ_{203}	—	December 15, 2007	Kitt Peak	Spacewatch	·	1.5 km	MPC · JPL
485584	2011 UR_{203}	—	October 21, 2011	Mount Lemmon	Mount Lemmon Survey	·	1.5 km	MPC · JPL
485585	2011 UU_{203}	—	October 26, 2011	Haleakala	Pan-STARRS 1	·	1.4 km	MPC · JPL
485586	2011 UC_{204}	—	October 26, 2011	Haleakala	Pan-STARRS 1	·	1.3 km	MPC · JPL
485587	2011 UQ_{205}	—	August 26, 1998	Kitt Peak	Spacewatch	·	1.3 km	MPC · JPL
485588	2011 UC_{206}	—	October 26, 2011	Haleakala	Pan-STARRS 1	·	1.7 km	MPC · JPL
485589	2011 UO_{237}	—	April 2, 2009	Kitt Peak	Spacewatch	·	1.7 km	MPC · JPL
485590	2011 UK_{242}	—	October 25, 2011	Haleakala	Pan-STARRS 1	·	1.3 km	MPC · JPL
485591	2011 UM_{242}	—	October 25, 2011	Haleakala	Pan-STARRS 1	·	1.7 km	MPC · JPL
485592	2011 UC_{243}	—	October 25, 2011	Haleakala	Pan-STARRS 1	(17392)	1.3 km	MPC · JPL
485593	2011 UX_{245}	—	May 8, 2005	Kitt Peak	Spacewatch	·	1.5 km	MPC · JPL
485594	2011 UD_{247}	—	September 25, 2006	Kitt Peak	Spacewatch	(13314)	1.5 km	MPC · JPL
485595	2011 UJ_{252}	—	October 26, 2011	Haleakala	Pan-STARRS 1	·	1.4 km	MPC · JPL
485596	2011 UL_{255}	—	November 18, 2007	Mount Lemmon	Mount Lemmon Survey	·	1.4 km	MPC · JPL
485597	2011 UZ_{258}	—	November 19, 2007	Mount Lemmon	Mount Lemmon Survey	·	1.0 km	MPC · JPL
485598	2011 UB_{260}	—	October 24, 2011	Haleakala	Pan-STARRS 1	·	1.1 km	MPC · JPL
485599	2011 UC_{263}	—	October 23, 2011	Kitt Peak	Spacewatch	·	1.2 km	MPC · JPL
485600	2011 UN_{266}	—	September 24, 2011	Haleakala	Pan-STARRS 1	·	1.2 km	MPC · JPL

== 485601–485700 ==
back to top

Designation			Discovery			Properties		Ref
Permanent	Provisional	Named after	Date	Site	Discoverer(s)	Category	Diam.	Ref
485601	2011 UH_{268}	—	April 9, 2003	Kitt Peak	Spacewatch	·	1.0 km	MPC · JPL
485602	2011 UQ_{271}	—	September 4, 2011	Haleakala	Pan-STARRS 1	·	1.5 km	MPC · JPL
485603	2011 UC_{275}	—	October 19, 2011	Kitt Peak	Spacewatch	·	1.3 km	MPC · JPL
485604	2011 UM_{276}	—	October 2, 2002	Socorro	LINEAR	·	1.6 km	MPC · JPL
485605	2011 UJ_{284}	—	October 28, 2011	Kitt Peak	Spacewatch	·	1.5 km	MPC · JPL
485606	2011 UB_{291}	—	September 25, 2011	Haleakala	Pan-STARRS 1	·	1.1 km	MPC · JPL
485607	2011 UQ_{295}	—	October 28, 2011	Catalina	CSS	·	1.4 km	MPC · JPL
485608	2011 UK_{305}	—	October 18, 2011	Haleakala	Pan-STARRS 1	·	2.2 km	MPC · JPL
485609	2011 UA_{307}	—	October 27, 2011	Mount Lemmon	Mount Lemmon Survey	·	1.2 km	MPC · JPL
485610	2011 UV_{312}	—	January 11, 2008	Mount Lemmon	Mount Lemmon Survey	AEO	830 m	MPC · JPL
485611	2011 UX_{315}	—	November 2, 2007	Kitt Peak	Spacewatch	·	1.0 km	MPC · JPL
485612	2011 UH_{316}	—	October 25, 2011	Haleakala	Pan-STARRS 1	·	1.6 km	MPC · JPL
485613	2011 UU_{319}	—	September 24, 2011	Mount Lemmon	Mount Lemmon Survey	·	1.3 km	MPC · JPL
485614	2011 UZ_{321}	—	October 31, 2011	XuYi	PMO NEO Survey Program	·	1.6 km	MPC · JPL
485615	2011 UR_{322}	—	October 21, 2011	Catalina	CSS	·	1.8 km	MPC · JPL
485616	2011 UW_{322}	—	October 27, 2011	Catalina	CSS	JUN	1.0 km	MPC · JPL
485617	2011 UN_{330}	—	January 18, 2008	Mount Lemmon	Mount Lemmon Survey	DOR	2.1 km	MPC · JPL
485618	2011 UE_{335}	—	October 12, 2007	Anderson Mesa	LONEOS	MAR	1.1 km	MPC · JPL
485619	2011 UR_{336}	—	September 4, 2011	Haleakala	Pan-STARRS 1	·	1.6 km	MPC · JPL
485620	2011 UE_{338}	—	December 13, 2007	Socorro	LINEAR	·	2.0 km	MPC · JPL
485621	2011 UW_{338}	—	September 21, 2011	Kitt Peak	Spacewatch	·	1.5 km	MPC · JPL
485622	2011 UQ_{360}	—	February 16, 2004	Kitt Peak	Spacewatch	·	1.1 km	MPC · JPL
485623	2011 UF_{362}	—	August 28, 2005	Siding Spring	SSS	·	2.1 km	MPC · JPL
485624	2011 UJ_{362}	—	October 21, 2011	Mount Lemmon	Mount Lemmon Survey	JUN	810 m	MPC · JPL
485625	2011 UC_{366}	—	November 13, 2007	Kitt Peak	Spacewatch	·	1.3 km	MPC · JPL
485626	2011 UY_{366}	—	December 4, 2007	Mount Lemmon	Mount Lemmon Survey	·	1.1 km	MPC · JPL
485627	2011 UM_{374}	—	October 23, 2011	Haleakala	Pan-STARRS 1	MAR	1.1 km	MPC · JPL
485628	2011 UQ_{375}	—	November 2, 2007	Kitt Peak	Spacewatch	·	1.2 km	MPC · JPL
485629	2011 UW_{380}	—	October 24, 2011	Kitt Peak	Spacewatch	·	1.0 km	MPC · JPL
485630	2011 UP_{383}	—	October 24, 2011	Haleakala	Pan-STARRS 1	·	1.8 km	MPC · JPL
485631	2011 UR_{383}	—	October 24, 2011	Haleakala	Pan-STARRS 1	·	1.4 km	MPC · JPL
485632	2011 UY_{389}	—	November 4, 2007	Kitt Peak	Spacewatch	MAR	1 km	MPC · JPL
485633	2011 UH_{391}	—	October 26, 2011	Haleakala	Pan-STARRS 1	·	1.6 km	MPC · JPL
485634	2011 UA_{398}	—	November 11, 2007	Mount Lemmon	Mount Lemmon Survey	·	1.3 km	MPC · JPL
485635	2011 UP_{404}	—	May 9, 2010	Mount Lemmon	Mount Lemmon Survey	·	2.3 km	MPC · JPL
485636	2011 UG_{405}	—	October 16, 2007	Catalina	CSS	·	1.5 km	MPC · JPL
485637	2011 VY_{2}	—	December 5, 2007	Kitt Peak	Spacewatch	·	1.5 km	MPC · JPL
485638	2011 VW_{8}	—	September 24, 2011	Haleakala	Pan-STARRS 1	·	1.3 km	MPC · JPL
485639	2011 VN_{11}	—	October 21, 2011	Mount Lemmon	Mount Lemmon Survey	·	1.6 km	MPC · JPL
485640	2011 VD_{23}	—	October 18, 2011	Haleakala	Pan-STARRS 1	MAR	1.5 km	MPC · JPL
485641	2011 WD_{5}	—	November 21, 2007	Catalina	CSS	EUN	1.4 km	MPC · JPL
485642	2011 WN_{14}	—	December 18, 2007	Kitt Peak	Spacewatch	·	1.8 km	MPC · JPL
485643	2011 WT_{14}	—	October 29, 2011	Haleakala	Pan-STARRS 1	EUN	1.4 km	MPC · JPL
485644	2011 WE_{27}	—	November 18, 2011	Mount Lemmon	Mount Lemmon Survey	·	1.9 km	MPC · JPL
485645	2011 WA_{29}	—	August 4, 2011	Haleakala	Pan-STARRS 1	MAR	1.3 km	MPC · JPL
485646	2011 WO_{29}	—	October 1, 2011	Mount Lemmon	Mount Lemmon Survey	·	1.3 km	MPC · JPL
485647	2011 WD_{30}	—	September 15, 2006	Kitt Peak	Spacewatch	·	1.6 km	MPC · JPL
485648	2011 WF_{34}	—	October 24, 2011	Haleakala	Pan-STARRS 1	·	1.0 km	MPC · JPL
485649	2011 WP_{38}	—	October 25, 2011	Haleakala	Pan-STARRS 1	·	1.5 km	MPC · JPL
485650	2011 WM_{39}	—	October 1, 2011	Kitt Peak	Spacewatch	·	1.2 km	MPC · JPL
485651	2011 WC_{40}	—	September 24, 2011	Haleakala	Pan-STARRS 1	PHO	840 m	MPC · JPL
485652	2011 WO_{41}	—	November 23, 2011	Kitt Peak	Spacewatch	T_{j} (2.7) · APO +1km · PHA	1.7 km	MPC · JPL
485653	2011 WU_{43}	—	November 24, 2011	Haleakala	Pan-STARRS 1	·	1.6 km	MPC · JPL
485654	2011 WG_{49}	—	December 5, 2002	Socorro	LINEAR	·	1.5 km	MPC · JPL
485655	2011 WV_{49}	—	November 23, 2011	Kitt Peak	Spacewatch	·	2.4 km	MPC · JPL
485656	2011 WR_{53}	—	October 25, 2011	Haleakala	Pan-STARRS 1	·	3.7 km	MPC · JPL
485657	2011 WN_{58}	—	October 26, 2011	Haleakala	Pan-STARRS 1	·	1.1 km	MPC · JPL
485658	2011 WQ_{62}	—	November 2, 2011	Mount Lemmon	Mount Lemmon Survey	·	1.2 km	MPC · JPL
485659	2011 WC_{63}	—	May 17, 2005	Mount Lemmon	Mount Lemmon Survey	·	1.5 km	MPC · JPL
485660	2011 WC_{65}	—	November 25, 2011	Haleakala	Pan-STARRS 1	·	2.2 km	MPC · JPL
485661	2011 WW_{72}	—	October 25, 2011	Haleakala	Pan-STARRS 1	·	1.6 km	MPC · JPL
485662	2011 WK_{85}	—	November 24, 2011	Haleakala	Pan-STARRS 1	·	1.2 km	MPC · JPL
485663	2011 WF_{87}	—	April 2, 2009	Kitt Peak	Spacewatch	·	1.3 km	MPC · JPL
485664	2011 WH_{87}	—	February 13, 2008	Mount Lemmon	Mount Lemmon Survey	·	1.2 km	MPC · JPL
485665	2011 WK_{88}	—	November 24, 2011	Mount Lemmon	Mount Lemmon Survey	·	1.4 km	MPC · JPL
485666	2011 WN_{88}	—	November 17, 2011	Mount Lemmon	Mount Lemmon Survey	·	3.5 km	MPC · JPL
485667	2011 WR_{89}	—	November 25, 2011	Haleakala	Pan-STARRS 1	·	1.6 km	MPC · JPL
485668	2011 WU_{94}	—	November 3, 2011	Kitt Peak	Spacewatch	·	1.0 km	MPC · JPL
485669	2011 WZ_{96}	—	January 11, 2008	Mount Lemmon	Mount Lemmon Survey	NEM	1.5 km	MPC · JPL
485670	2011 WL_{105}	—	October 25, 2011	Haleakala	Pan-STARRS 1	·	1.7 km	MPC · JPL
485671	2011 WN_{105}	—	October 20, 2011	Mount Lemmon	Mount Lemmon Survey	·	2.7 km	MPC · JPL
485672	2011 WS_{105}	—	October 25, 2011	Haleakala	Pan-STARRS 1	(194)	1.9 km	MPC · JPL
485673	2011 WG_{108}	—	November 17, 2011	Kitt Peak	Spacewatch	·	1.7 km	MPC · JPL
485674	2011 WF_{115}	—	November 25, 2011	Haleakala	Pan-STARRS 1	·	3.4 km	MPC · JPL
485675	2011 WG_{115}	—	November 5, 2011	Haleakala	Pan-STARRS 1	·	1.4 km	MPC · JPL
485676	2011 WL_{115}	—	December 14, 2007	Kitt Peak	Spacewatch	EUN	1.3 km	MPC · JPL
485677	2011 WU_{115}	—	October 14, 1998	Kitt Peak	Spacewatch	·	1.5 km	MPC · JPL
485678	2011 WK_{118}	—	November 18, 2011	Mount Lemmon	Mount Lemmon Survey	·	1.7 km	MPC · JPL
485679	2011 WV_{118}	—	September 16, 2006	Kitt Peak	Spacewatch	·	1.4 km	MPC · JPL
485680	2011 WN_{121}	—	November 3, 2011	Kitt Peak	Spacewatch	·	1.3 km	MPC · JPL
485681	2011 WY_{122}	—	October 31, 2011	Kitt Peak	Spacewatch	·	1.2 km	MPC · JPL
485682	2011 WR_{132}	—	January 19, 2008	Mount Lemmon	Mount Lemmon Survey	·	2.0 km	MPC · JPL
485683	2011 WP_{133}	—	November 17, 2011	Catalina	CSS	·	1.9 km	MPC · JPL
485684	2011 WS_{139}	—	October 21, 2011	Mount Lemmon	Mount Lemmon Survey	·	1.3 km	MPC · JPL
485685	2011 WD_{142}	—	October 26, 2011	Haleakala	Pan-STARRS 1	·	1.3 km	MPC · JPL
485686	2011 WK_{145}	—	November 25, 2011	Haleakala	Pan-STARRS 1	·	1.7 km	MPC · JPL
485687	2011 WV_{149}	—	November 3, 2011	Mount Lemmon	Mount Lemmon Survey	·	1.4 km	MPC · JPL
485688	2011 WH_{150}	—	October 23, 2011	Haleakala	Pan-STARRS 1	·	2.4 km	MPC · JPL
485689	2011 WL_{154}	—	February 13, 2008	Mount Lemmon	Mount Lemmon Survey	·	1.3 km	MPC · JPL
485690	2011 XS_{1}	—	November 26, 2011	Haleakala	Pan-STARRS 1	·	1.3 km	MPC · JPL
485691	2011 XE_{4}	—	December 6, 2011	Haleakala	Pan-STARRS 1	·	2.1 km	MPC · JPL
485692	2011 YR	—	January 15, 2004	Kitt Peak	Spacewatch	ADE	1.6 km	MPC · JPL
485693	2011 YS	—	September 24, 2011	Haleakala	Pan-STARRS 1	·	1.7 km	MPC · JPL
485694	2011 YS_{8}	—	December 31, 2007	Mount Lemmon	Mount Lemmon Survey	·	1.5 km	MPC · JPL
485695	2011 YL_{10}	—	November 24, 2011	Mount Lemmon	Mount Lemmon Survey	GEF	1.1 km	MPC · JPL
485696	2011 YR_{11}	—	October 22, 2006	Catalina	CSS	NEM	2.2 km	MPC · JPL
485697	2011 YH_{16}	—	October 20, 2011	Mount Lemmon	Mount Lemmon Survey	·	1.8 km	MPC · JPL
485698	2011 YS_{18}	—	December 17, 1993	Kitt Peak	Spacewatch	·	1.6 km	MPC · JPL
485699	2011 YL_{25}	—	November 4, 2010	Mount Lemmon	Mount Lemmon Survey	·	3.1 km	MPC · JPL
485700	2011 YD_{33}	—	November 14, 2006	Kitt Peak	Spacewatch	·	1.9 km	MPC · JPL

== 485701–485800 ==
back to top

Designation			Discovery			Properties		Ref
Permanent	Provisional	Named after	Date	Site	Discoverer(s)	Category	Diam.	Ref
485701	2011 YB_{37}	—	December 26, 2011	Kitt Peak	Spacewatch	·	2.0 km	MPC · JPL
485702	2011 YH_{39}	—	May 16, 2010	Catalina	CSS	H	630 m	MPC · JPL
485703	2011 YF_{46}	—	December 27, 2011	Kitt Peak	Spacewatch	·	2.0 km	MPC · JPL
485704	2011 YR_{47}	—	October 25, 2011	Haleakala	Pan-STARRS 1	·	2.3 km	MPC · JPL
485705	2011 YY_{67}	—	December 31, 2011	Kitt Peak	Spacewatch	·	1.7 km	MPC · JPL
485706	2011 YZ_{71}	—	December 26, 2011	Kitt Peak	Spacewatch	·	3.1 km	MPC · JPL
485707	2012 AB	—	November 18, 2007	Mount Lemmon	Mount Lemmon Survey	·	1.9 km	MPC · JPL
485708	2012 AT_{1}	—	December 25, 2011	Kitt Peak	Spacewatch	·	3.0 km	MPC · JPL
485709	2012 AH_{4}	—	January 1, 2012	Mount Lemmon	Mount Lemmon Survey	·	2.1 km	MPC · JPL
485710	2012 AO_{4}	—	January 1, 2012	Mount Lemmon	Mount Lemmon Survey	·	3.5 km	MPC · JPL
485711	2012 AZ_{6}	—	January 10, 2007	Mount Lemmon	Mount Lemmon Survey	H	430 m	MPC · JPL
485712	2012 AO_{7}	—	November 24, 2011	Mount Lemmon	Mount Lemmon Survey	·	430 m	MPC · JPL
485713	2012 AE_{17}	—	December 25, 2005	Kitt Peak	Spacewatch	·	2.8 km	MPC · JPL
485714	2012 AK_{17}	—	January 2, 2012	Mount Lemmon	Mount Lemmon Survey	H	430 m	MPC · JPL
485715	2012 AV_{17}	—	November 5, 2010	Mount Lemmon	Mount Lemmon Survey	·	2.5 km	MPC · JPL
485716	2012 AC_{23}	—	December 1, 2011	Haleakala	Pan-STARRS 1	·	1.6 km	MPC · JPL
485717	2012 BH_{1}	—	January 9, 2005	Catalina	CSS	·	670 m	MPC · JPL
485718	2012 BV_{2}	—	November 26, 2011	Mount Lemmon	Mount Lemmon Survey	·	1.8 km	MPC · JPL
485719	2012 BV_{4}	—	January 18, 2012	Kitt Peak	Spacewatch	·	2.2 km	MPC · JPL
485720	2012 BY_{6}	—	November 19, 2006	Kitt Peak	Spacewatch	·	2.3 km	MPC · JPL
485721	2012 BN_{9}	—	January 18, 2012	Kitt Peak	Spacewatch	·	2.7 km	MPC · JPL
485722	2012 BS_{14}	—	November 25, 2006	Mount Lemmon	Mount Lemmon Survey	·	2.0 km	MPC · JPL
485723	2012 BD_{15}	—	January 22, 1998	Kitt Peak	Spacewatch	·	3.1 km	MPC · JPL
485724	2012 BA_{25}	—	April 4, 2008	Mount Lemmon	Mount Lemmon Survey	·	1.8 km	MPC · JPL
485725	2012 BC_{28}	—	January 21, 2012	Catalina	CSS	MRX	1.0 km	MPC · JPL
485726	2012 BC_{35}	—	July 12, 2009	Kitt Peak	Spacewatch	·	2.8 km	MPC · JPL
485727	2012 BX_{52}	—	January 21, 2012	Kitt Peak	Spacewatch	·	2.8 km	MPC · JPL
485728	2012 BY_{55}	—	January 21, 2012	Haleakala	Pan-STARRS 1	·	1.9 km	MPC · JPL
485729	2012 BP_{57}	—	December 27, 2011	Kitt Peak	Spacewatch	·	1.7 km	MPC · JPL
485730	2012 BV_{57}	—	January 2, 2012	Mount Lemmon	Mount Lemmon Survey	EUN	1.2 km	MPC · JPL
485731	2012 BC_{58}	—	January 25, 2012	Catalina	CSS	·	3.5 km	MPC · JPL
485732	2012 BF_{59}	—	April 16, 2008	Mount Lemmon	Mount Lemmon Survey	·	1.7 km	MPC · JPL
485733	2012 BH_{69}	—	January 21, 2012	Kitt Peak	Spacewatch	·	1.8 km	MPC · JPL
485734	2012 BG_{73}	—	January 21, 2012	Haleakala	Pan-STARRS 1	·	3.1 km	MPC · JPL
485735	2012 BQ_{75}	—	January 2, 2012	Kitt Peak	Spacewatch	GEF	1.0 km	MPC · JPL
485736	2012 BY_{75}	—	November 26, 2011	Mount Lemmon	Mount Lemmon Survey	·	1.3 km	MPC · JPL
485737	2012 BL_{78}	—	January 4, 2012	Mount Lemmon	Mount Lemmon Survey	·	1.6 km	MPC · JPL
485738	2012 BZ_{79}	—	December 24, 2011	Mount Lemmon	Mount Lemmon Survey	·	1.8 km	MPC · JPL
485739	2012 BA_{86}	—	January 25, 2012	Haleakala	Pan-STARRS 1	H	440 m	MPC · JPL
485740	2012 BU_{86}	—	January 19, 2012	Catalina	CSS	·	1.8 km	MPC · JPL
485741	2012 BS_{88}	—	September 16, 2009	Mount Lemmon	Mount Lemmon Survey	·	2.5 km	MPC · JPL
485742	2012 BV_{89}	—	January 18, 2012	Kitt Peak	Spacewatch	·	1.8 km	MPC · JPL
485743	2012 BP_{93}	—	October 29, 2010	Catalina	CSS	EOS	1.8 km	MPC · JPL
485744	2012 BW_{95}	—	January 27, 2012	Mount Lemmon	Mount Lemmon Survey	EOS	1.4 km	MPC · JPL
485745	2012 BM_{98}	—	December 26, 2011	Kitt Peak	Spacewatch	·	1.5 km	MPC · JPL
485746	2012 BV_{99}	—	January 27, 2012	Kitt Peak	Spacewatch	·	2.4 km	MPC · JPL
485747	2012 BT_{103}	—	January 19, 2012	Haleakala	Pan-STARRS 1	·	3.9 km	MPC · JPL
485748	2012 BO_{104}	—	January 21, 2012	Haleakala	Pan-STARRS 1	·	4.0 km	MPC · JPL
485749	2012 BH_{105}	—	January 2, 2012	Kitt Peak	Spacewatch	·	2.2 km	MPC · JPL
485750	2012 BM_{105}	—	January 27, 2012	Mount Lemmon	Mount Lemmon Survey	·	2.9 km	MPC · JPL
485751	2012 BM_{109}	—	January 18, 1996	Kitt Peak	Spacewatch	·	2.4 km	MPC · JPL
485752	2012 BV_{121}	—	November 13, 2010	Mount Lemmon	Mount Lemmon Survey	·	2.6 km	MPC · JPL
485753	2012 BF_{124}	—	January 22, 2012	Haleakala	Pan-STARRS 1	H	560 m	MPC · JPL
485754	2012 BD_{126}	—	January 21, 2012	Haleakala	Pan-STARRS 1	·	3.1 km	MPC · JPL
485755	2012 BB_{130}	—	January 29, 2012	Mount Lemmon	Mount Lemmon Survey	·	1.9 km	MPC · JPL
485756	2012 BS_{134}	—	February 21, 2007	Mount Lemmon	Mount Lemmon Survey	H	340 m	MPC · JPL
485757	2012 BN_{136}	—	January 20, 2012	Haleakala	Pan-STARRS 1	·	2.9 km	MPC · JPL
485758	2012 BV_{138}	—	January 17, 2007	Mount Lemmon	Mount Lemmon Survey	·	2.0 km	MPC · JPL
485759	2012 BM_{152}	—	December 29, 2011	Kitt Peak	Spacewatch	·	1.9 km	MPC · JPL
485760	2012 CO_{2}	—	February 2, 2012	Mount Lemmon	Mount Lemmon Survey	H	590 m	MPC · JPL
485761	2012 CY_{5}	—	February 3, 2012	Mount Lemmon	Mount Lemmon Survey	·	1.8 km	MPC · JPL
485762	2012 CV_{13}	—	January 19, 2012	Haleakala	Pan-STARRS 1	·	1.8 km	MPC · JPL
485763	2012 CA_{14}	—	February 3, 2012	Haleakala	Pan-STARRS 1	·	2.8 km	MPC · JPL
485764	2012 CM_{14}	—	February 3, 2012	Haleakala	Pan-STARRS 1	EOS	2.1 km	MPC · JPL
485765	2012 CW_{14}	—	February 3, 2012	Haleakala	Pan-STARRS 1	·	3.9 km	MPC · JPL
485766	2012 CA_{16}	—	February 3, 2012	Haleakala	Pan-STARRS 1	·	1.8 km	MPC · JPL
485767	2012 CX_{18}	—	January 26, 2012	Mount Lemmon	Mount Lemmon Survey	·	2.4 km	MPC · JPL
485768	2012 CP_{24}	—	January 19, 2012	Haleakala	Pan-STARRS 1	·	1.8 km	MPC · JPL
485769	2012 CL_{27}	—	January 17, 2007	Mount Lemmon	Mount Lemmon Survey	·	1.4 km	MPC · JPL
485770	2012 CO_{29}	—	February 3, 2012	Haleakala	Pan-STARRS 1	(16286)	1.7 km	MPC · JPL
485771	2012 CA_{38}	—	February 2, 2008	Mount Lemmon	Mount Lemmon Survey	·	2.5 km	MPC · JPL
485772	2012 CJ_{38}	—	April 14, 2007	Kitt Peak	Spacewatch	·	2.4 km	MPC · JPL
485773	2012 CA_{40}	—	January 29, 2012	Kitt Peak	Spacewatch	·	1.8 km	MPC · JPL
485774	2012 CF_{40}	—	February 3, 2012	Haleakala	Pan-STARRS 1	·	2.8 km	MPC · JPL
485775	2012 CK_{40}	—	January 19, 2012	Kitt Peak	Spacewatch	·	2.7 km	MPC · JPL
485776	2012 CR_{40}	—	January 21, 2012	Haleakala	Pan-STARRS 1	EOS	2.3 km	MPC · JPL
485777	2012 CV_{44}	—	January 19, 2012	Haleakala	Pan-STARRS 1	·	3.1 km	MPC · JPL
485778	2012 CJ_{45}	—	August 25, 2009	La Sagra	OAM	·	4.0 km	MPC · JPL
485779	2012 CN_{45}	—	September 20, 2003	Kitt Peak	Spacewatch	·	3.6 km	MPC · JPL
485780	2012 CL_{52}	—	January 19, 2012	Haleakala	Pan-STARRS 1	·	3.4 km	MPC · JPL
485781	2012 DR_{4}	—	February 20, 2012	Haleakala	Pan-STARRS 1	H	520 m	MPC · JPL
485782	2012 DS_{4}	—	February 20, 2012	Haleakala	Pan-STARRS 1	H	450 m	MPC · JPL
485783	2012 DE_{6}	—	February 18, 2012	La Sagra	OAM	·	4.2 km	MPC · JPL
485784	2012 DZ_{10}	—	January 21, 2012	Haleakala	Pan-STARRS 1	·	2.9 km	MPC · JPL
485785	2012 DH_{11}	—	September 14, 2010	La Sagra	OAM	·	3.9 km	MPC · JPL
485786	2012 DC_{12}	—	January 30, 2012	Kitt Peak	Spacewatch	·	2.5 km	MPC · JPL
485787	2012 DB_{14}	—	January 19, 2012	Haleakala	Pan-STARRS 1	·	3.2 km	MPC · JPL
485788	2012 DM_{16}	—	February 21, 2012	Kitt Peak	Spacewatch	EOS	2.0 km	MPC · JPL
485789	2012 DR_{17}	—	January 27, 2012	Mount Lemmon	Mount Lemmon Survey	·	2.2 km	MPC · JPL
485790	2012 DP_{19}	—	February 13, 2012	Kitt Peak	Spacewatch	·	2.6 km	MPC · JPL
485791	2012 DF_{21}	—	September 25, 2009	Catalina	CSS	·	2.9 km	MPC · JPL
485792	2012 DK_{22}	—	January 14, 2010	WISE	WISE	·	4.1 km	MPC · JPL
485793	2012 DP_{23}	—	February 21, 2012	Kitt Peak	Spacewatch	·	2.8 km	MPC · JPL
485794	2012 DL_{24}	—	February 21, 2012	Kitt Peak	Spacewatch	·	3.1 km	MPC · JPL
485795	2012 DQ_{24}	—	September 29, 2005	Kitt Peak	Spacewatch	H	480 m	MPC · JPL
485796	2012 DO_{28}	—	April 24, 2007	Mount Lemmon	Mount Lemmon Survey	·	2.7 km	MPC · JPL
485797	2012 DF_{29}	—	November 1, 2005	Mount Lemmon	Mount Lemmon Survey	·	1.3 km	MPC · JPL
485798	2012 DN_{29}	—	February 22, 2012	Kitt Peak	Spacewatch	·	3.9 km	MPC · JPL
485799	2012 DE_{33}	—	September 7, 2004	Socorro	LINEAR	EOS	2.0 km	MPC · JPL
485800	2012 DL_{33}	—	January 14, 2010	WISE	WISE	·	3.2 km	MPC · JPL

== 485801–485900 ==
back to top

Designation			Discovery			Properties		Ref
Permanent	Provisional	Named after	Date	Site	Discoverer(s)	Category	Diam.	Ref
485801	2012 DJ_{34}	—	December 6, 2011	Haleakala	Pan-STARRS 1	EOS	2.1 km	MPC · JPL
485802	2012 DV_{34}	—	February 24, 2012	Kitt Peak	Spacewatch	·	2.8 km	MPC · JPL
485803	2012 DE_{35}	—	February 24, 2012	Kitt Peak	Spacewatch	·	2.9 km	MPC · JPL
485804	2012 DA_{37}	—	February 19, 2012	Kitt Peak	Spacewatch	·	2.6 km	MPC · JPL
485805	2012 DD_{40}	—	October 1, 2010	La Sagra	OAM	·	2.2 km	MPC · JPL
485806	2012 DN_{40}	—	February 25, 2012	Kitt Peak	Spacewatch	KOR	1.3 km	MPC · JPL
485807	2012 DE_{41}	—	February 16, 2012	Haleakala	Pan-STARRS 1	·	1.7 km	MPC · JPL
485808	2012 DR_{42}	—	December 15, 2006	Kitt Peak	Spacewatch	·	2.0 km	MPC · JPL
485809	2012 DE_{45}	—	December 4, 2005	Kitt Peak	Spacewatch	·	2.4 km	MPC · JPL
485810	2012 DL_{45}	—	January 19, 2012	Haleakala	Pan-STARRS 1	·	3.5 km	MPC · JPL
485811	2012 DQ_{46}	—	July 3, 2003	Kitt Peak	Spacewatch	·	2.6 km	MPC · JPL
485812	2012 DA_{48}	—	February 16, 2001	Kitt Peak	Spacewatch	·	3.2 km	MPC · JPL
485813	2012 DK_{48}	—	February 25, 2012	Kitt Peak	Spacewatch	·	2.3 km	MPC · JPL
485814	2012 DV_{48}	—	January 19, 2012	Haleakala	Pan-STARRS 1	·	3.6 km	MPC · JPL
485815	2012 DZ_{48}	—	April 25, 2007	Mount Lemmon	Mount Lemmon Survey	·	2.5 km	MPC · JPL
485816	2012 DJ_{52}	—	September 16, 2009	Mount Lemmon	Mount Lemmon Survey	EOS	2.1 km	MPC · JPL
485817	2012 DR_{52}	—	January 19, 2012	Haleakala	Pan-STARRS 1	THB	3.3 km	MPC · JPL
485818	2012 DU_{52}	—	September 22, 2009	Kitt Peak	Spacewatch	EOS	1.7 km	MPC · JPL
485819	2012 DY_{55}	—	December 25, 2011	Mount Lemmon	Mount Lemmon Survey	·	2.8 km	MPC · JPL
485820	2012 DF_{56}	—	February 13, 2012	Haleakala	Pan-STARRS 1	·	3.3 km	MPC · JPL
485821	2012 DQ_{57}	—	December 27, 2011	Mount Lemmon	Mount Lemmon Survey	EOS	1.9 km	MPC · JPL
485822	2012 DM_{60}	—	January 19, 2012	Haleakala	Pan-STARRS 1	·	3.1 km	MPC · JPL
485823	2012 DF_{61}	—	February 28, 2012	Socorro	LINEAR	APO	270 m	MPC · JPL
485824	2012 DE_{63}	—	January 26, 2012	Mount Lemmon	Mount Lemmon Survey	EOS	1.4 km	MPC · JPL
485825	2012 DB_{65}	—	February 16, 2012	Haleakala	Pan-STARRS 1	EOS	1.8 km	MPC · JPL
485826	2012 DH_{66}	—	February 24, 2012	Mount Lemmon	Mount Lemmon Survey	·	1.5 km	MPC · JPL
485827	2012 DB_{67}	—	February 1, 2012	Kitt Peak	Spacewatch	·	1.6 km	MPC · JPL
485828	2012 DM_{67}	—	December 4, 2011	Haleakala	Pan-STARRS 1	H	540 m	MPC · JPL
485829	2012 DQ_{68}	—	January 19, 2012	Haleakala	Pan-STARRS 1	·	2.1 km	MPC · JPL
485830	2012 DJ_{71}	—	December 10, 2005	Kitt Peak	Spacewatch	·	2.4 km	MPC · JPL
485831	2012 DW_{71}	—	January 19, 2012	Haleakala	Pan-STARRS 1	DOR	2.6 km	MPC · JPL
485832	2012 DH_{72}	—	December 25, 2011	Mount Lemmon	Mount Lemmon Survey	·	1.7 km	MPC · JPL
485833	2012 DY_{72}	—	February 14, 2012	Haleakala	Pan-STARRS 1	H	440 m	MPC · JPL
485834	2012 DM_{74}	—	February 27, 2012	Haleakala	Pan-STARRS 1	EOS	1.8 km	MPC · JPL
485835	2012 DS_{74}	—	November 4, 2010	Mount Lemmon	Mount Lemmon Survey	·	2.0 km	MPC · JPL
485836	2012 DZ_{74}	—	February 23, 2012	Mount Lemmon	Mount Lemmon Survey	·	1.9 km	MPC · JPL
485837	2012 DO_{75}	—	January 19, 2012	Haleakala	Pan-STARRS 1	·	2.6 km	MPC · JPL
485838	2012 DY_{75}	—	February 16, 2012	Haleakala	Pan-STARRS 1	HYG	2.5 km	MPC · JPL
485839	2012 DL_{76}	—	February 24, 2012	Haleakala	Pan-STARRS 1	H	410 m	MPC · JPL
485840	2012 DO_{76}	—	December 6, 2011	Haleakala	Pan-STARRS 1	·	3.0 km	MPC · JPL
485841	2012 DU_{79}	—	February 25, 2012	Catalina	CSS	H	550 m	MPC · JPL
485842	2012 DZ_{79}	—	October 28, 2011	Kitt Peak	Spacewatch	·	3.9 km	MPC · JPL
485843	2012 DF_{86}	—	March 10, 2007	Mount Lemmon	Mount Lemmon Survey	H	580 m	MPC · JPL
485844	2012 DL_{92}	—	January 7, 2006	Mount Lemmon	Mount Lemmon Survey	THM	1.9 km	MPC · JPL
485845	2012 DM_{92}	—	March 14, 2007	Mount Lemmon	Mount Lemmon Survey	·	1.9 km	MPC · JPL
485846	2012 DO_{94}	—	February 3, 2012	Haleakala	Pan-STARRS 1	·	2.4 km	MPC · JPL
485847	2012 EY	—	September 18, 2009	Mount Lemmon	Mount Lemmon Survey	·	1.7 km	MPC · JPL
485848	2012 EC_{2}	—	February 15, 2012	Haleakala	Pan-STARRS 1	H	440 m	MPC · JPL
485849	2012 EQ_{6}	—	November 27, 2010	Mount Lemmon	Mount Lemmon Survey	·	1.9 km	MPC · JPL
485850	2012 EB_{9}	—	February 18, 2012	Catalina	CSS	H	510 m	MPC · JPL
485851	2012 EN_{9}	—	March 14, 2012	Catalina	CSS	H	560 m	MPC · JPL
485852	2012 ED_{10}	—	March 14, 2012	Haleakala	Pan-STARRS 1	H	510 m	MPC · JPL
485853	2012 EG_{10}	—	February 18, 2012	Catalina	CSS	H	460 m	MPC · JPL
485854	2012 EM_{11}	—	February 26, 2007	Mount Lemmon	Mount Lemmon Survey	·	1.5 km	MPC · JPL
485855	2012 ER_{11}	—	March 13, 2012	Mount Lemmon	Mount Lemmon Survey	·	2.0 km	MPC · JPL
485856	2012 EO_{15}	—	February 4, 2006	Catalina	CSS	T_{j} (2.93)	5.1 km	MPC · JPL
485857	2012 FB	—	March 15, 2007	Mount Lemmon	Mount Lemmon Survey	H	570 m	MPC · JPL
485858	2012 FO	—	August 16, 2009	Kitt Peak	Spacewatch	·	3.0 km	MPC · JPL
485859	2012 FP	—	April 22, 2007	Kitt Peak	Spacewatch	·	1.0 km	MPC · JPL
485860	2012 FE_{1}	—	January 25, 2012	Catalina	CSS	H	560 m	MPC · JPL
485861	2012 FP_{6}	—	January 19, 2012	Haleakala	Pan-STARRS 1	·	2.1 km	MPC · JPL
485862	2012 FV_{6}	—	August 27, 2009	Kitt Peak	Spacewatch	·	1.6 km	MPC · JPL
485863	2012 FX_{6}	—	February 13, 2012	Haleakala	Pan-STARRS 1	·	2.3 km	MPC · JPL
485864	2012 FU_{8}	—	March 15, 2012	Mount Lemmon	Mount Lemmon Survey	·	1.7 km	MPC · JPL
485865	2012 FL_{10}	—	February 28, 2012	Haleakala	Pan-STARRS 1	H	500 m	MPC · JPL
485866	2012 FN_{14}	—	February 4, 2006	Kitt Peak	Spacewatch	·	2.6 km	MPC · JPL
485867	2012 FK_{17}	—	April 14, 2007	Mount Lemmon	Mount Lemmon Survey	·	1.5 km	MPC · JPL
485868	2012 FP_{17}	—	January 13, 2000	Kitt Peak	Spacewatch	·	2.2 km	MPC · JPL
485869	2012 FS_{25}	—	January 23, 2006	Kitt Peak	Spacewatch	·	2.3 km	MPC · JPL
485870	2012 FJ_{26}	—	March 26, 2001	Kitt Peak	Spacewatch	THM	1.9 km	MPC · JPL
485871	2012 FB_{27}	—	October 18, 2003	Kitt Peak	Spacewatch	VER	2.5 km	MPC · JPL
485872	2012 FF_{27}	—	February 28, 2012	Haleakala	Pan-STARRS 1	·	2.3 km	MPC · JPL
485873	2012 FK_{28}	—	January 31, 2006	Mount Lemmon	Mount Lemmon Survey	·	2.2 km	MPC · JPL
485874	2012 FN_{28}	—	February 28, 2012	Haleakala	Pan-STARRS 1	·	2.4 km	MPC · JPL
485875	2012 FV_{28}	—	March 13, 2012	Mount Lemmon	Mount Lemmon Survey	EOS	1.7 km	MPC · JPL
485876	2012 FC_{31}	—	April 23, 2001	Socorro	LINEAR	·	2.7 km	MPC · JPL
485877	2012 FJ_{31}	—	March 31, 2003	Kitt Peak	Spacewatch	·	2.1 km	MPC · JPL
485878	2012 FK_{31}	—	January 31, 2006	Kitt Peak	Spacewatch	HYG	2.4 km	MPC · JPL
485879	2012 FK_{33}	—	February 21, 2006	Catalina	CSS	·	3.7 km	MPC · JPL
485880	2012 FB_{34}	—	September 22, 2004	Kitt Peak	Spacewatch	·	2.5 km	MPC · JPL
485881	2012 FU_{34}	—	February 28, 2012	Haleakala	Pan-STARRS 1	·	2.7 km	MPC · JPL
485882	2012 FK_{35}	—	March 22, 2012	Catalina	CSS	APO +1km	790 m	MPC · JPL
485883	2012 FJ_{37}	—	October 17, 2009	Mount Lemmon	Mount Lemmon Survey	·	3.1 km	MPC · JPL
485884	2012 FP_{40}	—	September 7, 2008	Mount Lemmon	Mount Lemmon Survey	·	2.7 km	MPC · JPL
485885	2012 FW_{40}	—	March 11, 1996	Kitt Peak	Spacewatch	·	2.0 km	MPC · JPL
485886	2012 FB_{41}	—	March 4, 2012	Kitt Peak	Spacewatch	EOS	1.5 km	MPC · JPL
485887	2012 FC_{42}	—	February 27, 2012	Kitt Peak	Spacewatch	·	2.5 km	MPC · JPL
485888	2012 FJ_{42}	—	September 27, 2009	Kitt Peak	Spacewatch	·	2.8 km	MPC · JPL
485889	2012 FR_{43}	—	October 16, 2010	Siding Spring	SSS	H	670 m	MPC · JPL
485890	2012 FS_{47}	—	March 13, 2012	Mount Lemmon	Mount Lemmon Survey	·	2.4 km	MPC · JPL
485891	2012 FA_{48}	—	February 26, 2012	Haleakala	Pan-STARRS 1	·	2.5 km	MPC · JPL
485892	2012 FH_{48}	—	January 23, 2006	Kitt Peak	Spacewatch	THM	1.7 km	MPC · JPL
485893	2012 FL_{49}	—	April 24, 2007	Kitt Peak	Spacewatch	·	2.2 km	MPC · JPL
485894	2012 FE_{52}	—	December 6, 2011	Haleakala	Pan-STARRS 1	LIX	3.6 km	MPC · JPL
485895	2012 FL_{52}	—	February 2, 2009	Mount Lemmon	Mount Lemmon Survey	H	590 m	MPC · JPL
485896	2012 FS_{55}	—	March 25, 2012	Mount Lemmon	Mount Lemmon Survey	·	2.5 km	MPC · JPL
485897	2012 FK_{59}	—	March 19, 2007	Mount Lemmon	Mount Lemmon Survey	·	2.4 km	MPC · JPL
485898	2012 FR_{59}	—	March 13, 2012	Kitt Peak	Spacewatch	·	2.3 km	MPC · JPL
485899	2012 FK_{67}	—	September 30, 2005	Mount Lemmon	Mount Lemmon Survey	H	480 m	MPC · JPL
485900	2012 FD_{71}	—	January 29, 2004	Socorro	LINEAR	H	580 m	MPC · JPL

== 485901–486000 ==
back to top

Designation			Discovery			Properties		Ref
Permanent	Provisional	Named after	Date	Site	Discoverer(s)	Category	Diam.	Ref
485901	2012 FT_{71}	—	February 1, 2006	Catalina	CSS	·	2.9 km	MPC · JPL
485902	2012 FZ_{71}	—	March 29, 2012	Haleakala	Pan-STARRS 1	·	2.5 km	MPC · JPL
485903	2012 FB_{79}	—	August 18, 2009	Kitt Peak	Spacewatch	·	3.0 km	MPC · JPL
485904	2012 FH_{82}	—	February 3, 2006	Mount Lemmon	Mount Lemmon Survey	EMA	3.3 km	MPC · JPL
485905	2012 FS_{82}	—	January 5, 2006	Kitt Peak	Spacewatch	·	2.5 km	MPC · JPL
485906	2012 FM_{83}	—	March 14, 2012	Kitt Peak	Spacewatch	·	2.9 km	MPC · JPL
485907	2012 GM	—	February 19, 2004	Socorro	LINEAR	H	520 m	MPC · JPL
485908	2012 GN	—	December 6, 2011	Haleakala	Pan-STARRS 1	H	480 m	MPC · JPL
485909	2012 GE_{3}	—	November 8, 2009	Mount Lemmon	Mount Lemmon Survey	·	2.8 km	MPC · JPL
485910	2012 GW_{5}	—	March 27, 2012	Mount Lemmon	Mount Lemmon Survey	H	550 m	MPC · JPL
485911	2012 GA_{6}	—	October 5, 2005	Mount Lemmon	Mount Lemmon Survey	H	500 m	MPC · JPL
485912	2012 GW_{9}	—	January 5, 2012	Haleakala	Pan-STARRS 1	EOS	2.0 km	MPC · JPL
485913	2012 GX_{12}	—	March 17, 2012	Kitt Peak	Spacewatch	(1118)	3.7 km	MPC · JPL
485914	2012 GZ_{15}	—	December 13, 2010	Mauna Kea	M. Micheli, L. Wells	·	2.2 km	MPC · JPL
485915	2012 GG_{19}	—	January 30, 2012	Mount Lemmon	Mount Lemmon Survey	·	3.5 km	MPC · JPL
485916	2012 GN_{22}	—	January 14, 2011	Kitt Peak	Spacewatch	·	2.9 km	MPC · JPL
485917	2012 GB_{23}	—	April 15, 2012	Haleakala	Pan-STARRS 1	T_{j} (2.99)	4.3 km	MPC · JPL
485918	2012 GA_{27}	—	April 15, 2012	Haleakala	Pan-STARRS 1	H	600 m	MPC · JPL
485919	2012 GX_{31}	—	February 27, 2006	Catalina	CSS	·	3.3 km	MPC · JPL
485920	2012 GM_{32}	—	March 9, 2007	Mount Lemmon	Mount Lemmon Survey	·	1.4 km	MPC · JPL
485921	2012 GO_{32}	—	March 17, 2012	Kitt Peak	Spacewatch	EOS	1.9 km	MPC · JPL
485922	2012 GH_{33}	—	March 28, 2012	Kitt Peak	Spacewatch	·	2.7 km	MPC · JPL
485923	2012 GM_{33}	—	December 30, 2005	Kitt Peak	Spacewatch	·	1.8 km	MPC · JPL
485924	2012 GM_{35}	—	February 23, 2012	Mount Lemmon	Mount Lemmon Survey	·	3.0 km	MPC · JPL
485925	2012 GP_{35}	—	January 6, 2012	Haleakala	Pan-STARRS 1	·	3.0 km	MPC · JPL
485926	2012 GV_{35}	—	September 29, 2008	Mount Lemmon	Mount Lemmon Survey	·	2.0 km	MPC · JPL
485927	2012 GO_{36}	—	March 27, 2012	Haleakala	Pan-STARRS 1	·	3.6 km	MPC · JPL
485928	2012 GV_{36}	—	January 30, 2012	Haleakala	Pan-STARRS 1	EOS	2.1 km	MPC · JPL
485929	2012 HV	—	September 17, 2010	Catalina	CSS	H	580 m	MPC · JPL
485930	2012 HG_{3}	—	January 13, 2011	Kitt Peak	Spacewatch	·	2.7 km	MPC · JPL
485931	2012 HG_{4}	—	March 29, 2012	Haleakala	Pan-STARRS 1	·	2.4 km	MPC · JPL
485932	2012 HE_{6}	—	April 17, 2012	Kitt Peak	Spacewatch	·	2.6 km	MPC · JPL
485933	2012 HK_{7}	—	November 8, 2009	Kitt Peak	Spacewatch	·	3.8 km	MPC · JPL
485934	2012 HG_{9}	—	December 10, 2010	Mount Lemmon	Mount Lemmon Survey	·	2.5 km	MPC · JPL
485935	2012 HN_{9}	—	April 10, 2012	Kitt Peak	Spacewatch	·	3.0 km	MPC · JPL
485936	2012 HR_{9}	—	January 7, 2006	Mount Lemmon	Mount Lemmon Survey	·	2.8 km	MPC · JPL
485937	2012 HX_{15}	—	April 12, 2004	Anderson Mesa	LONEOS	H	510 m	MPC · JPL
485938	2012 HR_{20}	—	April 24, 2012	Haleakala	Pan-STARRS 1	·	330 m	MPC · JPL
485939	2012 HV_{24}	—	April 26, 2012	Haleakala	Pan-STARRS 1	H	510 m	MPC · JPL
485940	2012 HF_{25}	—	April 27, 2012	Haleakala	Pan-STARRS 1	H	540 m	MPC · JPL
485941	2012 HD_{33}	—	April 15, 2012	Haleakala	Pan-STARRS 1	·	2.7 km	MPC · JPL
485942	2012 HH_{36}	—	March 4, 2006	Kitt Peak	Spacewatch	EOS	1.7 km	MPC · JPL
485943	2012 HK_{37}	—	March 15, 2012	Haleakala	Pan-STARRS 1	·	3.4 km	MPC · JPL
485944	2012 HR_{38}	—	January 23, 2006	Kitt Peak	Spacewatch	·	2.5 km	MPC · JPL
485945	2012 HL_{44}	—	March 14, 2012	Kitt Peak	Spacewatch	·	2.9 km	MPC · JPL
485946	2012 HE_{45}	—	February 7, 2011	Kitt Peak	Spacewatch	THM	2.2 km	MPC · JPL
485947	2012 HK_{45}	—	April 20, 2012	Mount Lemmon	Mount Lemmon Survey	·	2.6 km	MPC · JPL
485948	2012 HK_{49}	—	February 1, 2006	Mount Lemmon	Mount Lemmon Survey	EOS	1.6 km	MPC · JPL
485949	2012 HR_{50}	—	April 21, 2012	Mount Lemmon	Mount Lemmon Survey	·	2.9 km	MPC · JPL
485950	2012 HT_{50}	—	April 24, 2012	Haleakala	Pan-STARRS 1	·	2.7 km	MPC · JPL
485951	2012 HD_{51}	—	April 24, 2012	Haleakala	Pan-STARRS 1	·	3.7 km	MPC · JPL
485952	2012 HK_{51}	—	February 8, 2011	Mount Lemmon	Mount Lemmon Survey	·	2.7 km	MPC · JPL
485953	2012 HU_{51}	—	November 23, 2009	Kitt Peak	Spacewatch	·	3.2 km	MPC · JPL
485954	2012 HW_{51}	—	January 5, 2012	Haleakala	Pan-STARRS 1	H	430 m	MPC · JPL
485955	2012 HV_{54}	—	April 21, 2012	Haleakala	Pan-STARRS 1	·	2.5 km	MPC · JPL
485956	2012 HY_{54}	—	February 25, 2012	Mount Lemmon	Mount Lemmon Survey	·	2.4 km	MPC · JPL
485957	2012 HL_{55}	—	April 1, 2012	Mount Lemmon	Mount Lemmon Survey	·	2.5 km	MPC · JPL
485958	2012 HA_{56}	—	April 16, 2012	Haleakala	Pan-STARRS 1	·	2.3 km	MPC · JPL
485959	2012 HR_{56}	—	May 25, 2007	Mount Lemmon	Mount Lemmon Survey	·	2.9 km	MPC · JPL
485960	2012 HN_{61}	—	February 3, 2000	Kitt Peak	Spacewatch	·	2.7 km	MPC · JPL
485961	2012 HF_{62}	—	March 4, 2012	Mount Lemmon	Mount Lemmon Survey	·	2.4 km	MPC · JPL
485962	2012 HX_{65}	—	January 23, 2006	Kitt Peak	Spacewatch	·	2.8 km	MPC · JPL
485963	2012 HB_{66}	—	January 29, 2006	Kitt Peak	Spacewatch	·	2.8 km	MPC · JPL
485964	2012 HO_{68}	—	April 21, 2012	Haleakala	Pan-STARRS 1	·	2.7 km	MPC · JPL
485965	2012 HW_{68}	—	April 19, 2012	Catalina	CSS	·	2.8 km	MPC · JPL
485966	2012 HQ_{70}	—	March 30, 2012	Mount Lemmon	Mount Lemmon Survey	·	2.3 km	MPC · JPL
485967	2012 HU_{73}	—	September 22, 2009	Kitt Peak	Spacewatch	·	2.4 km	MPC · JPL
485968	2012 HB_{75}	—	April 27, 2012	Haleakala	Pan-STARRS 1	HYG	2.3 km	MPC · JPL
485969	2012 HW_{75}	—	October 27, 2009	Mount Lemmon	Mount Lemmon Survey	·	2.6 km	MPC · JPL
485970	2012 HJ_{79}	—	October 7, 2008	Mount Lemmon	Mount Lemmon Survey	·	2.9 km	MPC · JPL
485971	2012 HS_{81}	—	March 14, 2012	Kitt Peak	Spacewatch	·	2.8 km	MPC · JPL
485972	2012 HX_{81}	—	February 27, 2006	Kitt Peak	Spacewatch	·	2.9 km	MPC · JPL
485973	2012 JJ	—	May 9, 2012	Haleakala	Pan-STARRS 1	H	550 m	MPC · JPL
485974	2012 JR	—	June 10, 2004	Campo Imperatore	CINEOS	H	650 m	MPC · JPL
485975	2012 JZ	—	April 27, 2012	Haleakala	Pan-STARRS 1	·	2.2 km	MPC · JPL
485976	2012 JY_{3}	—	February 13, 2011	Mount Lemmon	Mount Lemmon Survey	·	2.0 km	MPC · JPL
485977	2012 JS_{18}	—	March 3, 2006	Kitt Peak	Spacewatch	·	2.5 km	MPC · JPL
485978	2012 JV_{23}	—	February 25, 2010	WISE	WISE	·	5.3 km	MPC · JPL
485979	2012 JZ_{26}	—	June 16, 2007	Kitt Peak	Spacewatch	·	3.5 km	MPC · JPL
485980	2012 JV_{36}	—	November 8, 2010	Catalina	CSS	H	490 m	MPC · JPL
485981	2012 JT_{38}	—	November 30, 2010	Mount Lemmon	Mount Lemmon Survey	·	2.1 km	MPC · JPL
485982	2012 JQ_{63}	—	February 4, 2006	Kitt Peak	Spacewatch	·	2.0 km	MPC · JPL
485983	2012 JM_{65}	—	November 25, 2009	Kitt Peak	Spacewatch	·	1.9 km	MPC · JPL
485984	2012 JT_{66}	—	January 8, 2010	WISE	WISE	·	2.8 km	MPC · JPL
485985	2012 JW_{66}	—	December 25, 2005	Kitt Peak	Spacewatch	H	540 m	MPC · JPL
485986	2012 KF	—	May 16, 2012	Haleakala	Pan-STARRS 1	H	620 m	MPC · JPL
485987	2012 KH_{2}	—	January 28, 2011	Mount Lemmon	Mount Lemmon Survey	·	3.1 km	MPC · JPL
485988	2012 KC_{4}	—	February 14, 2009	Kitt Peak	Spacewatch	H	540 m	MPC · JPL
485989	2012 KP_{5}	—	January 13, 2011	Mount Lemmon	Mount Lemmon Survey	·	2.9 km	MPC · JPL
485990	2012 KY_{10}	—	April 18, 2012	Kitt Peak	Spacewatch	·	2.5 km	MPC · JPL
485991	2012 KZ_{11}	—	February 10, 2011	Mount Lemmon	Mount Lemmon Survey	·	2.9 km	MPC · JPL
485992	2012 KA_{17}	—	November 27, 2009	Mount Lemmon	Mount Lemmon Survey	CYB	5.4 km	MPC · JPL
485993	2012 KC_{17}	—	November 15, 2003	Kitt Peak	Spacewatch	·	3.3 km	MPC · JPL
485994	2012 KV_{34}	—	January 9, 2011	Mount Lemmon	Mount Lemmon Survey	·	2.3 km	MPC · JPL
485995	2012 KO_{38}	—	February 8, 2011	Mount Lemmon	Mount Lemmon Survey	·	2.5 km	MPC · JPL
485996	2012 KK_{47}	—	January 23, 2006	Kitt Peak	Spacewatch	·	2.8 km	MPC · JPL
485997	2012 LF	—	March 29, 2009	Siding Spring	SSS	H	640 m	MPC · JPL
485998	2012 LS	—	January 30, 2006	Kitt Peak	Spacewatch	·	2.7 km	MPC · JPL
485999	2012 LE_{2}	—	February 3, 2012	Mount Lemmon	Mount Lemmon Survey	·	3.0 km	MPC · JPL
486000	2012 LP_{2}	—	September 12, 2007	Mount Lemmon	Mount Lemmon Survey	·	3.1 km	MPC · JPL

back to top

== Meaning of names ==
As minor planet discoveries are confirmed, they are given a permanent number by the IAU's Minor Planet Center (MPC), and the discoverers can then submit names for them, following the IAU's naming conventions. The list below concerns those minor planets in the specified number-range that have received names, and explains the meanings of those names.

Official naming citations of newly named small Solar System bodies are approved and published in a bulletin by IAU's Working Group for Small Bodies Nomenclature (WGSBN). Before May 2021, citations were published in MPC's Minor Planet Circulars for many decades. Recent citations can also be found on the JPL Small-Body Database (SBDB). Until his death in 2016, German astronomer Lutz D. Schmadel compiled these citations into the Dictionary of Minor Planet Names (DMP) and regularly updated the collection.

Based on Paul Herget's The Names of the Minor Planets, Schmadel also researched the unclear origin of numerous asteroids, most of which had been named prior to World War II. This article incorporates text from this source, which is in the public domain: SBDB New namings may only be added to this list below after official publication as the preannouncement of names is condemned. The WGSBN publishes a comprehensive guideline for the naming rules of non-cometary small Solar System bodies.

Named minor planet	Provisional	This minor planet was named for...	Ref · Catalog
485320 Vértesernő	2011 BF_{44}	Ernő Vértes, Hungarian educator, amateur astronomer and the founder of the Gothard Astronomical Society, in Szombathely, Hungary.	IAU · 485320
