= List of minor planets: 754001–755000 =

The following is a partial list of minor planets, running from minor-planet number 754001 through 755000, inclusive. The primary data for this and other partial lists is based on JPL's "Small-Body Orbital Elements" and data available from the Minor Planet Center. Critical list information is also provided by the MPC, unless otherwise specified from Lowell Observatory. A detailed description of the table's columns and additional sources are given on the main page including a complete list of every page in this series, and a statistical break-up on the dynamical classification of minor planets.

Also see the summary list of all named bodies in numerical and alphabetical order, and the corresponding naming citations for the number range of this particular list. New namings may only be added to this list after official publication, as the preannouncement of names is condemned by the Working Group for Small Bodies Nomenclature of the International Astronomical Union.

Near-Earth obj.	MBA (inner)	MBA (outer)	Centaur
Mars-crosser	MBA (middle)	Jupiter trojan	Trans-Neptunian obj.
Unclassified

== 754001–754100 ==
Designation			Discovery			Properties		Ref
Permanent	Provisional	Named after	Date	Site	Discoverer(s)	Category	Diam.	Ref
754001	2016 FG_{18}	—	December 13, 2015	Haleakala	Pan-STARRS 1	EUP	3.1 km	MPC · JPL
754002	2016 FN_{18}	—	March 13, 2016	Haleakala	Pan-STARRS 1	·	1.6 km	MPC · JPL
754003	2016 FV_{18}	—	November 6, 2008	Mount Lemmon	Mount Lemmon Survey	(43176)	3.0 km	MPC · JPL
754004	2016 FX_{18}	—	January 18, 2016	Haleakala	Pan-STARRS 1	·	2.1 km	MPC · JPL
754005	2016 FO_{23}	—	October 25, 2008	Kitt Peak	Spacewatch	EOS	1.7 km	MPC · JPL
754006	2016 FF_{24}	—	December 13, 2015	Haleakala	Pan-STARRS 1	·	3.0 km	MPC · JPL
754007	2016 FU_{28}	—	March 4, 2016	Haleakala	Pan-STARRS 1	·	2.3 km	MPC · JPL
754008	2016 FV_{32}	—	August 29, 2006	Kitt Peak	Spacewatch	·	680 m	MPC · JPL
754009	2016 FE_{34}	—	March 4, 2016	Haleakala	Pan-STARRS 1	·	2.4 km	MPC · JPL
754010	2016 FO_{34}	—	October 3, 2013	Mount Lemmon	Mount Lemmon Survey	·	1.3 km	MPC · JPL
754011	2016 FL_{38}	—	September 23, 2012	Mount Lemmon	Mount Lemmon Survey	·	2.2 km	MPC · JPL
754012	2016 FS_{38}	—	April 27, 2011	Kitt Peak	Spacewatch	·	1.5 km	MPC · JPL
754013	2016 FL_{42}	—	January 16, 2009	Kitt Peak	Spacewatch	·	530 m	MPC · JPL
754014	2016 FV_{43}	—	March 10, 2016	Haleakala	Pan-STARRS 1	·	2.2 km	MPC · JPL
754015	2016 FB_{45}	—	March 11, 2005	Mount Lemmon	Mount Lemmon Survey	TIR	2.3 km	MPC · JPL
754016	2016 FB_{52}	—	December 16, 2004	Kitt Peak	Spacewatch	·	710 m	MPC · JPL
754017	2016 FA_{53}	—	March 12, 2016	Haleakala	Pan-STARRS 1	V	420 m	MPC · JPL
754018	2016 FP_{55}	—	August 13, 2012	Haleakala	Pan-STARRS 1	·	2.4 km	MPC · JPL
754019	2016 FP_{56}	—	September 11, 2001	Kitt Peak	Spacewatch	·	2.3 km	MPC · JPL
754020	2016 FT_{56}	—	November 6, 2008	Kitt Peak	Spacewatch	·	2.3 km	MPC · JPL
754021	2016 FV_{56}	—	February 4, 2016	Haleakala	Pan-STARRS 1	EOS	1.8 km	MPC · JPL
754022	2016 FM_{57}	—	January 16, 2016	Haleakala	Pan-STARRS 1	·	1.1 km	MPC · JPL
754023	2016 FP_{57}	—	March 12, 2016	Haleakala	Pan-STARRS 1	·	1.9 km	MPC · JPL
754024	2016 FH_{64}	—	January 17, 2012	Les Engarouines	L. Bernasconi	·	950 m	MPC · JPL
754025	2016 FW_{66}	—	February 16, 2010	Kitt Peak	Spacewatch	·	2.5 km	MPC · JPL
754026	2016 FS_{67}	—	January 19, 2015	Mount Lemmon	Mount Lemmon Survey	VER	2.1 km	MPC · JPL
754027	2016 FR_{68}	—	March 16, 2016	Mount Lemmon	Mount Lemmon Survey	·	1.0 km	MPC · JPL
754028	2016 FD_{70}	—	March 31, 2016	Haleakala	Pan-STARRS 1	·	2.1 km	MPC · JPL
754029	2016 FE_{73}	—	March 16, 2016	Haleakala	Pan-STARRS 1	·	2.3 km	MPC · JPL
754030	2016 FJ_{96}	—	March 18, 2016	Mount Lemmon	Mount Lemmon Survey	·	2.3 km	MPC · JPL
754031	2016 FX_{100}	—	March 28, 2016	Mount Lemmon	Mount Lemmon Survey	·	2.2 km	MPC · JPL
754032	2016 GU_{7}	—	February 10, 2016	Haleakala	Pan-STARRS 1	·	2.7 km	MPC · JPL
754033	2016 GD_{11}	—	January 19, 2015	Haleakala	Pan-STARRS 1	·	2.3 km	MPC · JPL
754034	2016 GO_{11}	—	October 21, 2011	Kitt Peak	Spacewatch	·	520 m	MPC · JPL
754035	2016 GM_{12}	—	September 3, 2013	ASC-Kislovodsk	Nevski, V.	·	920 m	MPC · JPL
754036	2016 GY_{13}	—	December 21, 2014	Haleakala	Pan-STARRS 1	·	2.0 km	MPC · JPL
754037	2016 GL_{14}	—	March 11, 2016	Haleakala	Pan-STARRS 1	·	2.2 km	MPC · JPL
754038	2016 GQ_{14}	—	September 10, 2013	Haleakala	Pan-STARRS 1	HOF	1.9 km	MPC · JPL
754039	2016 GY_{14}	—	April 2, 2011	Kitt Peak	Spacewatch	EOS	1.5 km	MPC · JPL
754040	2016 GV_{15}	—	December 12, 2014	Haleakala	Pan-STARRS 1	·	2.7 km	MPC · JPL
754041	2016 GY_{15}	—	September 5, 2008	Kitt Peak	Spacewatch	·	1.5 km	MPC · JPL
754042	2016 GE_{16}	—	October 4, 2013	Mount Lemmon	Mount Lemmon Survey	·	1.9 km	MPC · JPL
754043	2016 GF_{16}	—	September 10, 2007	Mount Lemmon	Mount Lemmon Survey	·	2.2 km	MPC · JPL
754044	2016 GZ_{16}	—	March 10, 2016	Haleakala	Pan-STARRS 1	NYS	790 m	MPC · JPL
754045	2016 GP_{18}	—	December 18, 2003	Kitt Peak	Spacewatch	·	2.0 km	MPC · JPL
754046	2016 GZ_{24}	—	March 13, 2016	Haleakala	Pan-STARRS 1	EOS	1.3 km	MPC · JPL
754047	2016 GU_{25}	—	March 12, 2016	Haleakala	Pan-STARRS 1	·	1.6 km	MPC · JPL
754048	2016 GG_{26}	—	September 9, 2007	Kitt Peak	Spacewatch	·	2.2 km	MPC · JPL
754049	2016 GT_{28}	—	September 1, 2013	Mount Lemmon	Mount Lemmon Survey	EOS	1.7 km	MPC · JPL
754050	2016 GV_{29}	—	February 10, 2016	Haleakala	Pan-STARRS 1	·	2.6 km	MPC · JPL
754051	2016 GC_{38}	—	May 1, 2011	Kitt Peak	Spacewatch	EOS	1.8 km	MPC · JPL
754052	2016 GZ_{40}	—	September 11, 2010	Mount Lemmon	Mount Lemmon Survey	·	660 m	MPC · JPL
754053	2016 GJ_{41}	—	October 4, 2007	Mount Lemmon	Mount Lemmon Survey	(31811)	2.1 km	MPC · JPL
754054	2016 GB_{46}	—	September 12, 2014	Haleakala	Pan-STARRS 1	·	480 m	MPC · JPL
754055	2016 GJ_{47}	—	March 10, 2016	Haleakala	Pan-STARRS 1	VER	2.2 km	MPC · JPL
754056	2016 GB_{51}	—	February 22, 2006	Mount Lemmon	Mount Lemmon Survey	·	600 m	MPC · JPL
754057	2016 GP_{53}	—	September 10, 2004	Bergisch Gladbach	W. Bickel	·	560 m	MPC · JPL
754058	2016 GU_{56}	—	October 8, 2007	Mount Lemmon	Mount Lemmon Survey	VER	2.3 km	MPC · JPL
754059	2016 GC_{60}	—	March 25, 2011	Kitt Peak	Spacewatch	EOS	1.5 km	MPC · JPL
754060	2016 GP_{60}	—	September 12, 2007	Kitt Peak	Spacewatch	·	2.6 km	MPC · JPL
754061	2016 GQ_{66}	—	September 19, 2007	Kitt Peak	Spacewatch	·	2.7 km	MPC · JPL
754062	2016 GP_{68}	—	September 26, 2008	Kitt Peak	Spacewatch	·	2.2 km	MPC · JPL
754063	2016 GZ_{68}	—	March 10, 2016	Haleakala	Pan-STARRS 1	·	2.5 km	MPC · JPL
754064	2016 GN_{69}	—	July 30, 2013	Kitt Peak	Spacewatch	NYS	870 m	MPC · JPL
754065	2016 GN_{71}	—	March 18, 2016	Mount Lemmon	Mount Lemmon Survey	·	2.5 km	MPC · JPL
754066	2016 GY_{71}	—	September 13, 2007	Mount Lemmon	Mount Lemmon Survey	VER	1.9 km	MPC · JPL
754067	2016 GB_{72}	—	January 19, 2015	Haleakala	Pan-STARRS 1	·	2.2 km	MPC · JPL
754068	2016 GM_{76}	—	March 31, 2016	Mount Lemmon	Mount Lemmon Survey	·	810 m	MPC · JPL
754069	2016 GK_{79}	—	September 14, 2007	Kitt Peak	Spacewatch	·	1.9 km	MPC · JPL
754070	2016 GN_{80}	—	September 24, 2013	Mount Lemmon	Mount Lemmon Survey	·	2.4 km	MPC · JPL
754071	2016 GN_{85}	—	February 27, 2009	Kitt Peak	Spacewatch	(2076)	530 m	MPC · JPL
754072	2016 GK_{90}	—	May 5, 2011	Mount Lemmon	Mount Lemmon Survey	EOS	1.9 km	MPC · JPL
754073	2016 GV_{91}	—	January 19, 2015	Mount Lemmon	Mount Lemmon Survey	·	2.4 km	MPC · JPL
754074	2016 GH_{93}	—	February 14, 2010	Mount Lemmon	Mount Lemmon Survey	·	2.2 km	MPC · JPL
754075	2016 GX_{94}	—	March 13, 2005	Kitt Peak	Spacewatch	·	2.5 km	MPC · JPL
754076	2016 GN_{95}	—	October 28, 2008	Kitt Peak	Spacewatch	·	2.2 km	MPC · JPL
754077	2016 GX_{104}	—	October 6, 2008	Mount Lemmon	Mount Lemmon Survey	·	1.2 km	MPC · JPL
754078	2016 GG_{107}	—	March 26, 2007	Mount Lemmon	Mount Lemmon Survey	·	1.7 km	MPC · JPL
754079	2016 GH_{112}	—	October 21, 2006	Mount Lemmon	Mount Lemmon Survey	NYS	790 m	MPC · JPL
754080	2016 GW_{112}	—	November 19, 2008	Kitt Peak	Spacewatch	·	1.3 km	MPC · JPL
754081	2016 GZ_{112}	—	January 27, 2011	Mount Lemmon	Mount Lemmon Survey	·	1.3 km	MPC · JPL
754082	2016 GJ_{113}	—	April 14, 2007	Kitt Peak	Spacewatch	·	1.5 km	MPC · JPL
754083	2016 GH_{118}	—	September 13, 2007	Mount Lemmon	Mount Lemmon Survey	·	2.2 km	MPC · JPL
754084	2016 GP_{118}	—	September 15, 2013	Haleakala	Pan-STARRS 1	T_{j} (2.99) · EUP	2.1 km	MPC · JPL
754085	2016 GB_{119}	—	June 21, 2007	Mount Lemmon	Mount Lemmon Survey	·	650 m	MPC · JPL
754086	2016 GL_{124}	—	July 30, 2013	Kitt Peak	Spacewatch	·	510 m	MPC · JPL
754087	2016 GB_{127}	—	November 20, 2008	Kitt Peak	Spacewatch	·	2.0 km	MPC · JPL
754088	2016 GE_{128}	—	December 1, 2014	Haleakala	Pan-STARRS 1	·	2.6 km	MPC · JPL
754089	2016 GH_{129}	—	October 5, 2013	Mount Lemmon	Mount Lemmon Survey	·	2.4 km	MPC · JPL
754090	2016 GL_{137}	—	April 10, 2005	Mount Lemmon	Mount Lemmon Survey	·	2.3 km	MPC · JPL
754091	2016 GX_{138}	—	March 10, 2016	Haleakala	Pan-STARRS 1	·	580 m	MPC · JPL
754092	2016 GP_{140}	—	August 17, 2012	Haleakala	Pan-STARRS 1	·	2.6 km	MPC · JPL
754093	2016 GF_{141}	—	March 1, 2012	Mount Lemmon	Mount Lemmon Survey	·	800 m	MPC · JPL
754094	2016 GG_{142}	—	March 7, 2016	Haleakala	Pan-STARRS 1	EOS	1.6 km	MPC · JPL
754095	2016 GV_{143}	—	October 23, 2003	Anderson Mesa	LONEOS	·	2.4 km	MPC · JPL
754096	2016 GJ_{145}	—	May 15, 2012	Haleakala	Pan-STARRS 1	DOR	1.7 km	MPC · JPL
754097	2016 GH_{146}	—	October 7, 2008	Kitt Peak	Spacewatch	·	1.8 km	MPC · JPL
754098	2016 GQ_{153}	—	February 9, 2016	Haleakala	Pan-STARRS 1	·	2.1 km	MPC · JPL
754099	2016 GG_{154}	—	February 9, 2016	Haleakala	Pan-STARRS 1	·	660 m	MPC · JPL
754100	2016 GA_{155}	—	February 9, 2016	Haleakala	Pan-STARRS 1	·	1.9 km	MPC · JPL

== 754101–754200 ==
back to top

Designation			Discovery			Properties		Ref
Permanent	Provisional	Named after	Date	Site	Discoverer(s)	Category	Diam.	Ref
754101	2016 GT_{155}	—	December 3, 2014	Haleakala	Pan-STARRS 1	EOS	1.5 km	MPC · JPL
754102	2016 GB_{156}	—	September 27, 2006	Mount Lemmon	Mount Lemmon Survey	·	1.2 km	MPC · JPL
754103	2016 GL_{157}	—	March 10, 2016	Haleakala	Pan-STARRS 1	·	710 m	MPC · JPL
754104	2016 GC_{158}	—	March 30, 2016	Haleakala	Pan-STARRS 1	·	690 m	MPC · JPL
754105	2016 GV_{158}	—	August 15, 2013	Haleakala	Pan-STARRS 1	TIR	1.9 km	MPC · JPL
754106	2016 GU_{162}	—	October 12, 2013	Catalina	CSS	·	2.9 km	MPC · JPL
754107	2016 GE_{163}	—	January 20, 2009	Kitt Peak	Spacewatch	·	560 m	MPC · JPL
754108	2016 GH_{166}	—	May 8, 2011	Mount Lemmon	Mount Lemmon Survey	·	1.3 km	MPC · JPL
754109	2016 GZ_{166}	—	January 19, 2015	Haleakala	Pan-STARRS 1	·	2.3 km	MPC · JPL
754110	2016 GQ_{167}	—	October 3, 2010	Catalina	CSS	·	670 m	MPC · JPL
754111	2016 GQ_{169}	—	July 13, 2013	Haleakala	Pan-STARRS 1	·	650 m	MPC · JPL
754112	2016 GB_{172}	—	December 19, 2007	Mount Lemmon	Mount Lemmon Survey	·	980 m	MPC · JPL
754113	2016 GF_{174}	—	February 17, 2015	Haleakala	Pan-STARRS 1	·	2.5 km	MPC · JPL
754114	2016 GL_{175}	—	January 14, 2015	Haleakala	Pan-STARRS 1	·	2.6 km	MPC · JPL
754115	2016 GN_{177}	—	March 17, 2016	Haleakala	Pan-STARRS 1	·	810 m	MPC · JPL
754116	2016 GZ_{177}	—	August 14, 2013	Haleakala	Pan-STARRS 1	·	910 m	MPC · JPL
754117	2016 GP_{178}	—	November 9, 2013	Mount Lemmon	Mount Lemmon Survey	·	1.5 km	MPC · JPL
754118	2016 GS_{179}	—	July 4, 2013	Haleakala	Pan-STARRS 1	·	600 m	MPC · JPL
754119	2016 GL_{182}	—	November 17, 2014	Mount Lemmon	Mount Lemmon Survey	·	960 m	MPC · JPL
754120	2016 GE_{185}	—	April 3, 2016	Haleakala	Pan-STARRS 1	T_{j} (2.99)	3.7 km	MPC · JPL
754121	2016 GY_{186}	—	October 4, 2006	Mount Lemmon	Mount Lemmon Survey	·	810 m	MPC · JPL
754122	2016 GM_{191}	—	December 13, 2014	Haleakala	Pan-STARRS 1	T_{j} (2.91)	3.2 km	MPC · JPL
754123	2016 GB_{194}	—	November 1, 2008	Mount Lemmon	Mount Lemmon Survey	·	2.6 km	MPC · JPL
754124	2016 GF_{195}	—	September 5, 2007	Mount Lemmon	Mount Lemmon Survey	EOS	1.5 km	MPC · JPL
754125	2016 GP_{198}	—	December 21, 2014	Haleakala	Pan-STARRS 1	·	2.4 km	MPC · JPL
754126	2016 GN_{200}	—	March 10, 2016	Haleakala	Pan-STARRS 1	HYG	2.2 km	MPC · JPL
754127	2016 GU_{201}	—	March 25, 2009	Mount Lemmon	Mount Lemmon Survey	·	800 m	MPC · JPL
754128	2016 GE_{203}	—	March 2, 2016	Haleakala	Pan-STARRS 1	·	2.4 km	MPC · JPL
754129	2016 GH_{207}	—	April 29, 2011	Kitt Peak	Spacewatch	·	2.4 km	MPC · JPL
754130	2016 GC_{208}	—	February 11, 2016	Haleakala	Pan-STARRS 1	·	2.3 km	MPC · JPL
754131	2016 GD_{209}	—	October 27, 2008	Mount Lemmon	Mount Lemmon Survey	·	1.4 km	MPC · JPL
754132	2016 GA_{212}	—	March 16, 2016	Haleakala	Pan-STARRS 1	·	700 m	MPC · JPL
754133	2016 GJ_{212}	—	January 19, 2012	Mount Lemmon	Mount Lemmon Survey	·	790 m	MPC · JPL
754134	2016 GW_{212}	—	January 27, 2015	Haleakala	Pan-STARRS 1	·	1.7 km	MPC · JPL
754135	2016 GA_{214}	—	April 1, 2011	Kitt Peak	Spacewatch	·	2.2 km	MPC · JPL
754136	2016 GC_{215}	—	December 21, 2014	Haleakala	Pan-STARRS 1	PHO	790 m	MPC · JPL
754137	2016 GM_{218}	—	December 29, 2014	Haleakala	Pan-STARRS 1	·	2.8 km	MPC · JPL
754138	2016 GU_{218}	—	January 19, 2015	Mount Lemmon	Mount Lemmon Survey	VER	2.0 km	MPC · JPL
754139	2016 GB_{220}	—	February 21, 2015	Mount Lemmon	Mount Lemmon Survey	·	3.0 km	MPC · JPL
754140	2016 GN_{225}	—	April 26, 2000	Kitt Peak	Spacewatch	·	2.2 km	MPC · JPL
754141	2016 GC_{227}	—	June 20, 2013	Haleakala	Pan-STARRS 1	·	530 m	MPC · JPL
754142	2016 GO_{229}	—	May 24, 2011	Mount Lemmon	Mount Lemmon Survey	·	2.1 km	MPC · JPL
754143	2016 GK_{231}	—	March 6, 2016	Haleakala	Pan-STARRS 1	·	2.8 km	MPC · JPL
754144	2016 GH_{236}	—	April 14, 2016	Haleakala	Pan-STARRS 1	·	860 m	MPC · JPL
754145	2016 GU_{237}	—	September 3, 2013	Kitt Peak	Spacewatch	·	910 m	MPC · JPL
754146	2016 GM_{238}	—	September 6, 2013	Mount Lemmon	Mount Lemmon Survey	·	1.2 km	MPC · JPL
754147	2016 GS_{238}	—	November 12, 2001	Apache Point	SDSS	·	2.4 km	MPC · JPL
754148	2016 GV_{239}	—	February 16, 2012	Haleakala	Pan-STARRS 1	PHO	630 m	MPC · JPL
754149	2016 GE_{240}	—	February 10, 2016	Haleakala	Pan-STARRS 1	·	2.5 km	MPC · JPL
754150	2016 GO_{242}	—	October 30, 2008	Kitt Peak	Spacewatch	·	2.4 km	MPC · JPL
754151	2016 GF_{244}	—	December 29, 2011	Kitt Peak	Spacewatch	·	610 m	MPC · JPL
754152	2016 GK_{248}	—	December 1, 2014	Haleakala	Pan-STARRS 1	·	2.8 km	MPC · JPL
754153	2016 GC_{249}	—	October 2, 2013	Haleakala	Pan-STARRS 1	·	2.6 km	MPC · JPL
754154	2016 GN_{249}	—	March 13, 2016	Haleakala	Pan-STARRS 1	V	510 m	MPC · JPL
754155	2016 GY_{252}	—	October 26, 2009	Mount Lemmon	Mount Lemmon Survey	L4	8.3 km	MPC · JPL
754156	2016 GS_{257}	—	June 20, 2006	Mount Lemmon	Mount Lemmon Survey	·	2.9 km	MPC · JPL
754157	2016 GF_{258}	—	April 23, 2007	Mount Lemmon	Mount Lemmon Survey	(18466)	2.1 km	MPC · JPL
754158	2016 GK_{258}	—	October 8, 2007	Mount Lemmon	Mount Lemmon Survey	·	2.3 km	MPC · JPL
754159	2016 GV_{259}	—	January 19, 2015	Haleakala	Pan-STARRS 1	·	2.4 km	MPC · JPL
754160	2016 GL_{261}	—	January 20, 2015	Haleakala	Pan-STARRS 1	·	2.5 km	MPC · JPL
754161	2016 GS_{261}	—	April 18, 2009	Kitt Peak	Spacewatch	V	490 m	MPC · JPL
754162	2016 GA_{263}	—	June 5, 2011	Mount Lemmon	Mount Lemmon Survey	·	2.5 km	MPC · JPL
754163	2016 GH_{263}	—	April 30, 2005	Kitt Peak	Spacewatch	·	2.5 km	MPC · JPL
754164	2016 GL_{265}	—	April 10, 2016	Haleakala	Pan-STARRS 1	·	2.7 km	MPC · JPL
754165	2016 GO_{266}	—	April 12, 2016	Haleakala	Pan-STARRS 1	·	2.4 km	MPC · JPL
754166	2016 GZ_{268}	—	April 15, 2016	Haleakala	Pan-STARRS 1	V	520 m	MPC · JPL
754167	2016 GO_{271}	—	June 12, 2013	Haleakala	Pan-STARRS 1	·	540 m	MPC · JPL
754168	2016 GN_{275}	—	April 6, 2016	Mount Lemmon	Mount Lemmon Survey	·	2.5 km	MPC · JPL
754169	2016 GF_{276}	—	September 29, 2008	Mount Lemmon	Mount Lemmon Survey	·	2.0 km	MPC · JPL
754170	2016 GC_{279}	—	April 4, 2016	Mount Lemmon	Mount Lemmon Survey	·	1.3 km	MPC · JPL
754171	2016 GR_{282}	—	April 5, 2016	Haleakala	Pan-STARRS 1	·	860 m	MPC · JPL
754172	2016 GP_{285}	—	September 24, 2009	Catalina	CSS	·	1.2 km	MPC · JPL
754173	2016 GY_{287}	—	April 12, 2016	Haleakala	Pan-STARRS 1	·	640 m	MPC · JPL
754174	2016 GO_{288}	—	April 12, 2016	Haleakala	Pan-STARRS 1	·	580 m	MPC · JPL
754175	2016 GT_{293}	—	April 1, 2016	Haleakala	Pan-STARRS 1	·	2.6 km	MPC · JPL
754176	2016 GR_{300}	—	April 4, 2016	Haleakala	Pan-STARRS 1	·	1.4 km	MPC · JPL
754177	2016 GX_{301}	—	April 3, 2016	Haleakala	Pan-STARRS 1	·	1.4 km	MPC · JPL
754178	2016 GR_{303}	—	October 8, 2012	Haleakala	Pan-STARRS 1	·	2.2 km	MPC · JPL
754179	2016 GS_{310}	—	March 31, 2011	Mount Lemmon	Mount Lemmon Survey	·	2.0 km	MPC · JPL
754180	2016 GC_{319}	—	April 3, 2016	Haleakala	Pan-STARRS 1	·	2.0 km	MPC · JPL
754181	2016 GL_{333}	—	April 11, 2016	Haleakala	Pan-STARRS 1	LUT	2.9 km	MPC · JPL
754182	2016 GN_{333}	—	April 2, 2016	Haleakala	Pan-STARRS 1	·	2.7 km	MPC · JPL
754183	2016 HV_{1}	—	March 31, 2016	Haleakala	Pan-STARRS 1	·	620 m	MPC · JPL
754184	2016 HY_{3}	—	November 17, 2014	Mount Lemmon	Mount Lemmon Survey	·	630 m	MPC · JPL
754185	2016 HE_{5}	—	April 1, 2009	Mount Lemmon	Mount Lemmon Survey	·	680 m	MPC · JPL
754186	2016 HN_{6}	—	January 11, 2016	Haleakala	Pan-STARRS 1	·	1.5 km	MPC · JPL
754187	2016 HK_{7}	—	October 23, 2013	Kitt Peak	Spacewatch	·	1.1 km	MPC · JPL
754188	2016 HC_{8}	—	December 18, 2009	Mount Lemmon	Mount Lemmon Survey	·	2.9 km	MPC · JPL
754189	2016 HX_{15}	—	October 2, 2013	Kitt Peak	Spacewatch	·	3.5 km	MPC · JPL
754190	2016 HC_{22}	—	September 3, 2013	Mount Lemmon	Mount Lemmon Survey	MAS	560 m	MPC · JPL
754191	2016 HJ_{23}	—	March 1, 2009	Kitt Peak	Spacewatch	·	700 m	MPC · JPL
754192	2016 HF_{25}	—	November 8, 2010	Mauna Kea	Forshay, P., M. Micheli	V	510 m	MPC · JPL
754193	2016 HS_{25}	—	February 12, 2002	Kitt Peak	Spacewatch	·	1.3 km	MPC · JPL
754194	2016 HG_{29}	—	April 30, 2016	Kitt Peak	Spacewatch	·	640 m	MPC · JPL
754195	2016 HV_{39}	—	April 29, 2016	Mount Lemmon	Mount Lemmon Survey	·	2.6 km	MPC · JPL
754196	2016 JS_{1}	—	August 14, 2013	Haleakala	Pan-STARRS 1	·	770 m	MPC · JPL
754197	2016 JH_{7}	—	February 28, 2012	Haleakala	Pan-STARRS 1	·	970 m	MPC · JPL
754198	2016 JP_{9}	—	January 21, 2015	Haleakala	Pan-STARRS 1	·	2.4 km	MPC · JPL
754199	2016 JZ_{9}	—	July 6, 2013	Haleakala	Pan-STARRS 1	·	610 m	MPC · JPL
754200	2016 JR_{10}	—	March 4, 2016	Haleakala	Pan-STARRS 1	·	1.0 km	MPC · JPL

== 754201–754300 ==
back to top

Designation			Discovery			Properties		Ref
Permanent	Provisional	Named after	Date	Site	Discoverer(s)	Category	Diam.	Ref
754201	2016 JZ_{11}	—	May 30, 2011	Haleakala	Pan-STARRS 1	H	450 m	MPC · JPL
754202	2016 JX_{19}	—	April 30, 2016	Haleakala	Pan-STARRS 1	·	870 m	MPC · JPL
754203	2016 JG_{22}	—	May 3, 2016	Mount Lemmon	Mount Lemmon Survey	JUN	930 m	MPC · JPL
754204	2016 JD_{32}	—	November 18, 2014	Haleakala	Pan-STARRS 1	PHO	830 m	MPC · JPL
754205	2016 JX_{37}	—	November 28, 2014	Haleakala	Pan-STARRS 1	·	2.6 km	MPC · JPL
754206	2016 JX_{40}	—	December 21, 2008	Kitt Peak	Spacewatch	·	2.5 km	MPC · JPL
754207	2016 JX_{42}	—	August 13, 2006	Palomar	NEAT	·	2.1 km	MPC · JPL
754208	2016 JS_{46}	—	May 14, 2005	Mount Lemmon	Mount Lemmon Survey	·	750 m	MPC · JPL
754209	2016 JY_{46}	—	May 3, 2016	Haleakala	Pan-STARRS 1	·	770 m	MPC · JPL
754210	2016 JA_{47}	—	May 3, 2016	Haleakala	Pan-STARRS 1	·	670 m	MPC · JPL
754211	2016 JZ_{47}	—	October 11, 2010	Kitt Peak	Spacewatch	·	550 m	MPC · JPL
754212	2016 JF_{50}	—	May 1, 2016	Haleakala	Pan-STARRS 1	EOS	1.5 km	MPC · JPL
754213	2016 KU_{8}	—	March 13, 2012	Kitt Peak	Spacewatch	BAP	650 m	MPC · JPL
754214	2016 LX	—	June 1, 2000	Haleakala	NEAT	·	810 m	MPC · JPL
754215	2016 LQ_{3}	—	June 3, 2013	Mount Lemmon	Mount Lemmon Survey	PHO	840 m	MPC · JPL
754216	2016 LP_{7}	—	July 4, 2005	Kitt Peak	Spacewatch	·	890 m	MPC · JPL
754217	2016 LS_{9}	—	May 11, 2005	Catalina	CSS	AMO	550 m	MPC · JPL
754218	2016 LZ_{12}	—	March 15, 2012	Mount Lemmon	Mount Lemmon Survey	·	1.0 km	MPC · JPL
754219	2016 LO_{21}	—	September 28, 2013	Mount Lemmon	Mount Lemmon Survey	·	910 m	MPC · JPL
754220	2016 LV_{25}	—	May 30, 2016	Haleakala	Pan-STARRS 1	·	1.5 km	MPC · JPL
754221	2016 LV_{29}	—	January 17, 2015	Haleakala	Pan-STARRS 1	·	900 m	MPC · JPL
754222	2016 LC_{31}	—	May 30, 2016	Haleakala	Pan-STARRS 1	·	2.7 km	MPC · JPL
754223	2016 LQ_{31}	—	March 15, 2015	Haleakala	Pan-STARRS 1	·	1.3 km	MPC · JPL
754224	2016 LC_{37}	—	January 18, 2015	Haleakala	Pan-STARRS 1	·	870 m	MPC · JPL
754225	2016 LA_{40}	—	September 21, 2009	Catalina	CSS	·	1.1 km	MPC · JPL
754226	2016 LC_{40}	—	September 13, 2007	Mount Lemmon	Mount Lemmon Survey	·	570 m	MPC · JPL
754227	2016 LB_{41}	—	August 26, 2012	Haleakala	Pan-STARRS 1	·	1.6 km	MPC · JPL
754228	2016 LW_{44}	—	June 2, 2016	Mount Lemmon	Mount Lemmon Survey	·	580 m	MPC · JPL
754229	2016 LF_{50}	—	March 16, 2015	Haleakala	Pan-STARRS 1	·	2.8 km	MPC · JPL
754230	2016 LS_{50}	—	October 9, 2012	Mount Lemmon	Mount Lemmon Survey	·	1.4 km	MPC · JPL
754231	2016 LY_{51}	—	May 2, 2016	Haleakala	Pan-STARRS 1	·	2.1 km	MPC · JPL
754232	2016 LP_{52}	—	June 2, 2016	Haleakala	Pan-STARRS 1	H	430 m	MPC · JPL
754233	2016 LC_{56}	—	January 23, 2015	Haleakala	Pan-STARRS 1	·	2.7 km	MPC · JPL
754234	2016 LF_{63}	—	January 28, 2015	Haleakala	Pan-STARRS 1	PHO	690 m	MPC · JPL
754235	2016 LS_{64}	—	June 13, 2016	Haleakala	Pan-STARRS 1	·	1.3 km	MPC · JPL
754236	2016 LE_{67}	—	December 27, 2006	Mount Lemmon	Mount Lemmon Survey	·	1.4 km	MPC · JPL
754237	2016 LG_{71}	—	June 7, 2016	Mount Lemmon	Mount Lemmon Survey	H	370 m	MPC · JPL
754238	2016 LA_{75}	—	June 7, 2016	Haleakala	Pan-STARRS 1	·	1.1 km	MPC · JPL
754239	2016 LA_{77}	—	June 7, 2016	Mount Lemmon	Mount Lemmon Survey	·	2.6 km	MPC · JPL
754240	2016 LB_{77}	—	June 4, 2016	Haleakala	Pan-STARRS 1	·	1.0 km	MPC · JPL
754241	2016 LG_{79}	—	June 8, 2016	Haleakala	Pan-STARRS 1	·	1.1 km	MPC · JPL
754242	2016 LH_{80}	—	June 13, 2016	Haleakala	Pan-STARRS 1	·	940 m	MPC · JPL
754243	2016 LH_{81}	—	June 7, 2016	Haleakala	Pan-STARRS 1	·	2.8 km	MPC · JPL
754244	2016 LM_{81}	—	June 8, 2016	Mount Lemmon	Mount Lemmon Survey	MAS	540 m	MPC · JPL
754245	2016 LP_{86}	—	June 5, 2016	Haleakala	Pan-STARRS 1	·	2.0 km	MPC · JPL
754246	2016 LA_{91}	—	June 8, 2016	Haleakala	Pan-STARRS 1	·	2.0 km	MPC · JPL
754247	2016 LS_{91}	—	June 8, 2016	Haleakala	Pan-STARRS 1	3:2	3.9 km	MPC · JPL
754248	2016 LO_{95}	—	June 7, 2016	Haleakala	Pan-STARRS 1	·	3.0 km	MPC · JPL
754249	2016 LO_{96}	—	June 7, 2016	Haleakala	Pan-STARRS 1	·	3.5 km	MPC · JPL
754250	2016 LR_{96}	—	October 15, 2009	Mount Lemmon	Mount Lemmon Survey	3:2 · (6124)	3.7 km	MPC · JPL
754251	2016 MD_{2}	—	April 16, 2016	Haleakala	Pan-STARRS 1	·	2.5 km	MPC · JPL
754252	2016 MN_{3}	—	October 29, 2011	Haleakala	Pan-STARRS 1	LIX	3.0 km	MPC · JPL
754253	2016 MZ_{3}	—	June 29, 2016	Haleakala	Pan-STARRS 1	EOS	1.4 km	MPC · JPL
754254	2016 NL	—	July 3, 2016	Haleakala	Pan-STARRS 1	H	450 m	MPC · JPL
754255	2016 NO	—	July 3, 2016	Mount Lemmon	Mount Lemmon Survey	H	420 m	MPC · JPL
754256	2016 NO_{3}	—	June 8, 2016	Mount Lemmon	Mount Lemmon Survey	(2076)	640 m	MPC · JPL
754257	2016 ND_{6}	—	January 16, 2015	Haleakala	Pan-STARRS 1	·	770 m	MPC · JPL
754258 Anghel	2016 NW_{6}	Anghel	September 8, 2013	La Palma	EURONEAR	·	1.0 km	MPC · JPL
754259	2016 NF_{9}	—	December 21, 2014	Haleakala	Pan-STARRS 1	NYS	1.1 km	MPC · JPL
754260	2016 NY_{10}	—	December 11, 2012	Mount Lemmon	Mount Lemmon Survey	·	2.3 km	MPC · JPL
754261	2016 NM_{11}	—	July 5, 2016	Mount Lemmon	Mount Lemmon Survey	·	1.0 km	MPC · JPL
754262	2016 NN_{13}	—	January 19, 2015	Mount Lemmon	Mount Lemmon Survey	GAL	1.7 km	MPC · JPL
754263	2016 NX_{17}	—	September 27, 2003	Apache Point	SDSS	H	440 m	MPC · JPL
754264	2016 NQ_{22}	—	June 5, 2011	Mount Lemmon	Mount Lemmon Survey	·	1.6 km	MPC · JPL
754265	2016 NG_{26}	—	January 28, 2007	Catalina	CSS	PHO	760 m	MPC · JPL
754266	2016 NZ_{26}	—	May 12, 2015	Mount Lemmon	Mount Lemmon Survey	·	2.6 km	MPC · JPL
754267	2016 NN_{31}	—	May 13, 2016	Haleakala	Pan-STARRS 1	·	1.0 km	MPC · JPL
754268	2016 NE_{34}	—	February 27, 2012	Haleakala	Pan-STARRS 1	·	650 m	MPC · JPL
754269	2016 NY_{35}	—	January 22, 2015	Haleakala	Pan-STARRS 1	NYS	830 m	MPC · JPL
754270	2016 NJ_{43}	—	March 3, 2009	Mount Lemmon	Mount Lemmon Survey	EOS	1.6 km	MPC · JPL
754271	2016 NK_{43}	—	February 7, 2011	Mount Lemmon	Mount Lemmon Survey	·	910 m	MPC · JPL
754272	2016 NH_{45}	—	July 5, 2005	Mount Lemmon	Mount Lemmon Survey	·	2.2 km	MPC · JPL
754273	2016 NP_{45}	—	July 12, 2016	Mount Lemmon	Mount Lemmon Survey	·	920 m	MPC · JPL
754274	2016 NT_{46}	—	September 17, 2009	Moletai	K. Černis, Zdanavicius, K.	V	620 m	MPC · JPL
754275	2016 NB_{47}	—	September 18, 2003	Kitt Peak	Spacewatch	·	560 m	MPC · JPL
754276	2016 NR_{47}	—	December 13, 2006	Mount Lemmon	Mount Lemmon Survey	·	870 m	MPC · JPL
754277	2016 NA_{48}	—	September 15, 2009	Kitt Peak	Spacewatch	·	790 m	MPC · JPL
754278	2016 NP_{50}	—	November 6, 2012	Nogales	M. Schwartz, P. R. Holvorcem	·	1.1 km	MPC · JPL
754279	2016 NX_{55}	—	September 26, 2012	Haleakala	Pan-STARRS 1	·	620 m	MPC · JPL
754280	2016 NW_{56}	—	December 24, 2006	Kitt Peak	Spacewatch	H	500 m	MPC · JPL
754281	2016 NH_{57}	—	July 6, 2013	Haleakala	Pan-STARRS 1	H	510 m	MPC · JPL
754282	2016 NK_{57}	—	July 4, 2013	Haleakala	Pan-STARRS 1	H	410 m	MPC · JPL
754283	2016 NQ_{58}	—	November 2, 2008	Catalina	CSS	H	510 m	MPC · JPL
754284	2016 NH_{63}	—	July 11, 2016	Haleakala	Pan-STARRS 1	·	930 m	MPC · JPL
754285	2016 NV_{64}	—	July 14, 2016	Haleakala	Pan-STARRS 1	·	1.3 km	MPC · JPL
754286	2016 NN_{70}	—	July 11, 2016	Haleakala	Pan-STARRS 1	·	1.0 km	MPC · JPL
754287	2016 NL_{75}	—	July 4, 2016	Haleakala	Pan-STARRS 1	EOS	1.8 km	MPC · JPL
754288	2016 NR_{75}	—	January 30, 2011	Mount Lemmon	Mount Lemmon Survey	·	780 m	MPC · JPL
754289	2016 NF_{79}	—	July 6, 2016	Haleakala	Pan-STARRS 1	·	2.4 km	MPC · JPL
754290	2016 NV_{80}	—	March 28, 2015	Haleakala	Pan-STARRS 1	·	2.4 km	MPC · JPL
754291	2016 NJ_{84}	—	September 4, 2011	Haleakala	Pan-STARRS 1	·	2.3 km	MPC · JPL
754292	2016 NY_{84}	—	April 24, 2007	Mount Lemmon	Mount Lemmon Survey	MAR	940 m	MPC · JPL
754293	2016 NT_{86}	—	July 3, 2016	Mount Lemmon	Mount Lemmon Survey	·	2.6 km	MPC · JPL
754294	2016 NT_{88}	—	July 14, 2016	Haleakala	Pan-STARRS 1	·	790 m	MPC · JPL
754295	2016 NA_{90}	—	September 30, 2005	Kitt Peak	Spacewatch	THM	2.0 km	MPC · JPL
754296	2016 ND_{92}	—	July 14, 2016	Haleakala	Pan-STARRS 1	·	960 m	MPC · JPL
754297	2016 NL_{94}	—	July 14, 2016	Haleakala	Pan-STARRS 1	·	1 km	MPC · JPL
754298	2016 NB_{96}	—	July 11, 2016	Mount Lemmon	Mount Lemmon Survey	·	1.2 km	MPC · JPL
754299	2016 NX_{96}	—	July 13, 2016	Mount Lemmon	Mount Lemmon Survey	·	1.0 km	MPC · JPL
754300	2016 NM_{107}	—	July 12, 2016	Mount Lemmon	Mount Lemmon Survey	·	1.1 km	MPC · JPL

== 754301–754400 ==
back to top

Designation			Discovery			Properties		Ref
Permanent	Provisional	Named after	Date	Site	Discoverer(s)	Category	Diam.	Ref
754301	2016 NR_{108}	—	July 11, 2016	Haleakala	Pan-STARRS 1	·	2.3 km	MPC · JPL
754302	2016 NW_{108}	—	July 5, 2016	Haleakala	Pan-STARRS 1	·	1.4 km	MPC · JPL
754303	2016 NX_{108}	—	July 5, 2016	Haleakala	Pan-STARRS 1	·	2.5 km	MPC · JPL
754304	2016 NF_{109}	—	July 14, 2016	Haleakala	Pan-STARRS 1	MAS	630 m	MPC · JPL
754305	2016 NR_{109}	—	July 9, 2016	Kitt Peak	Spacewatch	H	560 m	MPC · JPL
754306	2016 NP_{111}	—	July 12, 2016	Mount Lemmon	Mount Lemmon Survey	·	830 m	MPC · JPL
754307	2016 NY_{111}	—	July 4, 2016	Haleakala	Pan-STARRS 1	·	1.1 km	MPC · JPL
754308	2016 NF_{114}	—	July 12, 2016	Mount Lemmon	Mount Lemmon Survey	·	770 m	MPC · JPL
754309	2016 NM_{114}	—	July 7, 2016	Haleakala	Pan-STARRS 1	·	990 m	MPC · JPL
754310	2016 NT_{116}	—	July 7, 2016	Mount Lemmon	Mount Lemmon Survey	MAR	760 m	MPC · JPL
754311	2016 NA_{117}	—	July 4, 2016	Haleakala	Pan-STARRS 1	V	540 m	MPC · JPL
754312	2016 NJ_{117}	—	July 8, 2016	Haleakala	Pan-STARRS 1	·	840 m	MPC · JPL
754313	2016 NV_{117}	—	July 9, 2016	Mount Lemmon	Mount Lemmon Survey	PHO	590 m	MPC · JPL
754314	2016 NP_{119}	—	June 9, 2012	Mount Lemmon	Mount Lemmon Survey	·	760 m	MPC · JPL
754315	2016 NY_{123}	—	July 11, 2016	Haleakala	Pan-STARRS 1	·	860 m	MPC · JPL
754316	2016 NA_{124}	—	July 12, 2016	Mount Lemmon	Mount Lemmon Survey	MAS	530 m	MPC · JPL
754317	2016 NG_{124}	—	July 14, 2016	Haleakala	Pan-STARRS 1	MAS	570 m	MPC · JPL
754318	2016 NL_{127}	—	July 13, 2016	Haleakala	Pan-STARRS 1	·	1.1 km	MPC · JPL
754319	2016 NM_{128}	—	July 8, 2016	Haleakala	Pan-STARRS 1	NYS	850 m	MPC · JPL
754320	2016 NT_{140}	—	July 5, 2016	Haleakala	Pan-STARRS 1	EOS	1.3 km	MPC · JPL
754321	2016 ND_{153}	—	July 28, 2012	Haleakala	Pan-STARRS 1	·	1.6 km	MPC · JPL
754322	2016 ND_{154}	—	July 5, 2016	Haleakala	Pan-STARRS 1	·	1.7 km	MPC · JPL
754323	2016 OC_{1}	—	November 20, 2012	Nogales	M. Schwartz, P. R. Holvorcem	·	1.4 km	MPC · JPL
754324	2016 OQ_{1}	—	July 7, 2016	Haleakala	Pan-STARRS 1	·	1.9 km	MPC · JPL
754325	2016 OQ_{2}	—	June 16, 2012	Haleakala	Pan-STARRS 1	·	1.6 km	MPC · JPL
754326	2016 ON_{3}	—	March 29, 2012	Haleakala	Pan-STARRS 1	·	720 m	MPC · JPL
754327	2016 OP_{3}	—	March 12, 2002	Palomar	NEAT	H	420 m	MPC · JPL
754328	2016 OQ_{7}	—	April 23, 2014	Haleakala	Pan-STARRS 1	·	1.1 km	MPC · JPL
754329	2016 OG_{9}	—	July 30, 2016	Haleakala	Pan-STARRS 1	·	1.2 km	MPC · JPL
754330	2016 OD_{10}	—	October 15, 1995	Kitt Peak	Spacewatch	BRG	1.1 km	MPC · JPL
754331	2016 OM_{11}	—	July 17, 2016	Haleakala	Pan-STARRS 1	·	1.1 km	MPC · JPL
754332	2016 OO_{11}	—	July 30, 2016	Haleakala	Pan-STARRS 1	·	760 m	MPC · JPL
754333	2016 OL_{12}	—	July 17, 2016	Haleakala	Pan-STARRS 1	·	910 m	MPC · JPL
754334	2016 PE_{6}	—	October 8, 2008	Catalina	CSS	·	860 m	MPC · JPL
754335	2016 PN_{6}	—	November 24, 2012	Kitt Peak	Spacewatch	·	1.5 km	MPC · JPL
754336	2016 PR_{14}	—	October 14, 2009	Mount Lemmon	Mount Lemmon Survey	·	800 m	MPC · JPL
754337	2016 PF_{16}	—	October 25, 2005	Mount Lemmon	Mount Lemmon Survey	·	790 m	MPC · JPL
754338	2016 PL_{16}	—	October 22, 2012	Mount Lemmon	Mount Lemmon Survey	·	1.3 km	MPC · JPL
754339	2016 PP_{19}	—	October 31, 2013	Kitt Peak	Spacewatch	·	1.0 km	MPC · JPL
754340	2016 PQ_{20}	—	December 4, 2010	Mount Lemmon	Mount Lemmon Survey	·	670 m	MPC · JPL
754341	2016 PK_{21}	—	March 28, 2015	Haleakala	Pan-STARRS 1	T_{j} (2.99) · 3:2	4.3 km	MPC · JPL
754342	2016 PT_{21}	—	September 28, 2000	Kitt Peak	Spacewatch	·	890 m	MPC · JPL
754343	2016 PU_{23}	—	August 7, 2016	Haleakala	Pan-STARRS 1	·	1 km	MPC · JPL
754344	2016 PW_{33}	—	September 27, 2006	Mount Lemmon	Mount Lemmon Survey	·	710 m	MPC · JPL
754345	2016 PG_{37}	—	June 7, 2016	Haleakala	Pan-STARRS 1	H	480 m	MPC · JPL
754346	2016 PU_{40}	—	November 16, 2006	Kitt Peak	Spacewatch	·	770 m	MPC · JPL
754347	2016 PZ_{48}	—	July 4, 2016	Haleakala	Pan-STARRS 1	·	890 m	MPC · JPL
754348	2016 PH_{50}	—	September 21, 2009	Mount Lemmon	Mount Lemmon Survey	·	1.1 km	MPC · JPL
754349	2016 PQ_{54}	—	May 11, 2015	Mount Lemmon	Mount Lemmon Survey	·	1.1 km	MPC · JPL
754350	2016 PM_{56}	—	August 7, 2016	Haleakala	Pan-STARRS 1	·	900 m	MPC · JPL
754351	2016 PK_{57}	—	April 7, 2014	Mount Lemmon	Mount Lemmon Survey	·	2.5 km	MPC · JPL
754352	2016 PS_{57}	—	January 28, 2014	Catalina	CSS	EUN	900 m	MPC · JPL
754353	2016 PS_{59}	—	July 9, 2015	Haleakala	Pan-STARRS 1	·	2.4 km	MPC · JPL
754354	2016 PB_{61}	—	July 30, 2016	Haleakala	Pan-STARRS 1	·	890 m	MPC · JPL
754355	2016 PC_{66}	—	June 13, 2016	Haleakala	Pan-STARRS 1	·	550 m	MPC · JPL
754356	2016 PX_{69}	—	July 5, 2016	Haleakala	Pan-STARRS 1	·	910 m	MPC · JPL
754357	2016 PB_{70}	—	July 5, 2016	Haleakala	Pan-STARRS 1	·	2.7 km	MPC · JPL
754358	2016 PC_{71}	—	April 13, 2015	Haleakala	Pan-STARRS 1	·	2.1 km	MPC · JPL
754359	2016 PY_{71}	—	September 20, 2011	Kitt Peak	Spacewatch	VER	2.3 km	MPC · JPL
754360	2016 PQ_{72}	—	October 6, 2012	Haleakala	Pan-STARRS 1	ADE	1.5 km	MPC · JPL
754361	2016 PA_{73}	—	August 10, 2016	Haleakala	Pan-STARRS 1	V	560 m	MPC · JPL
754362	2016 PE_{73}	—	February 15, 2010	Kitt Peak	Spacewatch	EUN	790 m	MPC · JPL
754363	2016 PO_{73}	—	October 1, 2008	Mount Lemmon	Mount Lemmon Survey	·	770 m	MPC · JPL
754364	2016 PB_{75}	—	August 24, 2012	Catalina	CSS	fast	1.1 km	MPC · JPL
754365	2016 PF_{76}	—	September 11, 2012	Mayhill-ISON	L. Elenin	·	1.2 km	MPC · JPL
754366	2016 PY_{76}	—	November 25, 2012	Kitt Peak	Spacewatch	·	1.2 km	MPC · JPL
754367	2016 PE_{77}	—	August 11, 2016	Haleakala	Pan-STARRS 1	·	1.1 km	MPC · JPL
754368	2016 PE_{79}	—	January 27, 2015	Haleakala	Pan-STARRS 1	H	390 m	MPC · JPL
754369	2016 PO_{81}	—	August 1, 2016	Haleakala	Pan-STARRS 1	·	920 m	MPC · JPL
754370	2016 PN_{83}	—	October 6, 2005	Kitt Peak	Spacewatch	·	1.8 km	MPC · JPL
754371	2016 PE_{84}	—	August 2, 2016	Haleakala	Pan-STARRS 1	·	2.1 km	MPC · JPL
754372	2016 PD_{90}	—	April 28, 2012	Mount Lemmon	Mount Lemmon Survey	·	580 m	MPC · JPL
754373	2016 PE_{90}	—	July 12, 2016	Mount Lemmon	Mount Lemmon Survey	V	510 m	MPC · JPL
754374	2016 PD_{91}	—	February 28, 2014	Haleakala	Pan-STARRS 1	·	840 m	MPC · JPL
754375	2016 PR_{95}	—	January 15, 2008	Mount Lemmon	Mount Lemmon Survey	·	680 m	MPC · JPL
754376	2016 PU_{95}	—	February 2, 2008	Mount Lemmon	Mount Lemmon Survey	·	730 m	MPC · JPL
754377	2016 PF_{98}	—	October 15, 2012	Mount Lemmon	Mount Lemmon Survey	·	660 m	MPC · JPL
754378	2016 PK_{98}	—	October 8, 2012	Kitt Peak	Spacewatch	KON	1.6 km	MPC · JPL
754379	2016 PZ_{99}	—	October 11, 2012	Mount Lemmon	Mount Lemmon Survey	·	1.2 km	MPC · JPL
754380	2016 PB_{102}	—	August 2, 2016	Haleakala	Pan-STARRS 1	·	1.4 km	MPC · JPL
754381	2016 PV_{104}	—	March 28, 2015	Haleakala	Pan-STARRS 1	·	1.1 km	MPC · JPL
754382	2016 PA_{105}	—	February 24, 2014	Haleakala	Pan-STARRS 1	·	1.1 km	MPC · JPL
754383	2016 PE_{107}	—	December 23, 2012	Haleakala	Pan-STARRS 1	·	2.4 km	MPC · JPL
754384	2016 PU_{108}	—	October 29, 2005	Kitt Peak	Spacewatch	·	880 m	MPC · JPL
754385	2016 PW_{110}	—	August 2, 2016	Haleakala	Pan-STARRS 1	·	660 m	MPC · JPL
754386	2016 PZ_{110}	—	August 2, 2016	Haleakala	Pan-STARRS 1	·	1.9 km	MPC · JPL
754387	2016 PG_{115}	—	July 12, 2016	Mount Lemmon	Mount Lemmon Survey	·	2.3 km	MPC · JPL
754388	2016 PV_{116}	—	December 27, 2013	Kitt Peak	Spacewatch	·	980 m	MPC · JPL
754389	2016 PX_{117}	—	February 14, 2013	Haleakala	Pan-STARRS 1	·	2.7 km	MPC · JPL
754390	2016 PT_{119}	—	May 18, 2015	Haleakala	Pan-STARRS 2	·	1.2 km	MPC · JPL
754391	2016 PC_{120}	—	October 15, 2012	Kitt Peak	Spacewatch	·	1.2 km	MPC · JPL
754392	2016 PJ_{121}	—	August 17, 2012	Haleakala	Pan-STARRS 1	·	1.0 km	MPC · JPL
754393	2016 PE_{122}	—	February 8, 2013	Haleakala	Pan-STARRS 1	·	2.7 km	MPC · JPL
754394	2016 PF_{122}	—	August 10, 2016	Haleakala	Pan-STARRS 1	·	1.5 km	MPC · JPL
754395	2016 PL_{122}	—	August 26, 2012	Haleakala	Pan-STARRS 1	PHO	570 m	MPC · JPL
754396	2016 PB_{123}	—	May 12, 2015	Mount Lemmon	Mount Lemmon Survey	·	770 m	MPC · JPL
754397	2016 PM_{124}	—	December 9, 2012	Haleakala	Pan-STARRS 1	ADE	1.5 km	MPC · JPL
754398	2016 PQ_{125}	—	February 28, 2014	Haleakala	Pan-STARRS 1	MAR	700 m	MPC · JPL
754399	2016 PZ_{127}	—	February 22, 2007	Kitt Peak	Spacewatch	·	1.0 km	MPC · JPL
754400	2016 PM_{129}	—	August 8, 2016	Haleakala	Pan-STARRS 1	·	1.1 km	MPC · JPL

== 754401–754500 ==
back to top

Designation			Discovery			Properties		Ref
Permanent	Provisional	Named after	Date	Site	Discoverer(s)	Category	Diam.	Ref
754401	2016 PT_{129}	—	August 2, 2016	Haleakala	Pan-STARRS 1	·	940 m	MPC · JPL
754402	2016 PY_{142}	—	August 2, 2016	Haleakala	Pan-STARRS 1	·	1.0 km	MPC · JPL
754403	2016 PT_{147}	—	August 1, 2016	Haleakala	Pan-STARRS 1	·	940 m	MPC · JPL
754404	2016 PH_{153}	—	August 3, 2016	Haleakala	Pan-STARRS 1	·	1.2 km	MPC · JPL
754405	2016 PL_{153}	—	August 14, 2012	Haleakala	Pan-STARRS 1	NYS	930 m	MPC · JPL
754406	2016 PT_{155}	—	August 15, 2016	Haleakala	Pan-STARRS 1	H	390 m	MPC · JPL
754407	2016 PD_{156}	—	August 7, 2016	Haleakala	Pan-STARRS 1	·	1.0 km	MPC · JPL
754408	2016 PF_{163}	—	August 13, 2016	Haleakala	Pan-STARRS 1	·	880 m	MPC · JPL
754409	2016 PS_{165}	—	August 10, 2016	Haleakala	Pan-STARRS 1	HOF	2.0 km	MPC · JPL
754410	2016 PM_{166}	—	August 2, 2016	Haleakala	Pan-STARRS 1	·	1 km	MPC · JPL
754411	2016 PQ_{166}	—	August 8, 2016	Haleakala	Pan-STARRS 1	·	2.1 km	MPC · JPL
754412	2016 PT_{166}	—	August 8, 2016	Haleakala	Pan-STARRS 1	·	780 m	MPC · JPL
754413	2016 PU_{166}	—	March 27, 2015	Haleakala	Pan-STARRS 1	·	980 m	MPC · JPL
754414	2016 PF_{167}	—	August 2, 2016	Haleakala	Pan-STARRS 1	·	1.1 km	MPC · JPL
754415	2016 PU_{167}	—	August 1, 2016	Haleakala	Pan-STARRS 1	·	830 m	MPC · JPL
754416	2016 PU_{168}	—	August 10, 2016	Haleakala	Pan-STARRS 1	·	690 m	MPC · JPL
754417	2016 PB_{174}	—	August 12, 2016	Haleakala	Pan-STARRS 1	·	930 m	MPC · JPL
754418	2016 PS_{175}	—	August 3, 2016	Haleakala	Pan-STARRS 1	·	860 m	MPC · JPL
754419	2016 PV_{175}	—	August 2, 2016	Haleakala	Pan-STARRS 1	·	770 m	MPC · JPL
754420	2016 PZ_{175}	—	August 3, 2016	Haleakala	Pan-STARRS 1	·	850 m	MPC · JPL
754421	2016 PC_{176}	—	August 12, 2016	Haleakala	Pan-STARRS 1	·	930 m	MPC · JPL
754422	2016 PJ_{182}	—	April 25, 2015	Cerro Tololo	DECam	·	560 m	MPC · JPL
754423	2016 PB_{183}	—	August 7, 2016	Haleakala	Pan-STARRS 1	·	1.1 km	MPC · JPL
754424	2016 PN_{196}	—	August 3, 2016	Haleakala	Pan-STARRS 1	·	740 m	MPC · JPL
754425	2016 PX_{241}	—	August 3, 2016	Haleakala	Pan-STARRS 1	·	950 m	MPC · JPL
754426	2016 PB_{263}	—	August 8, 2016	Haleakala	Pan-STARRS 1	·	1.8 km	MPC · JPL
754427	2016 QL_{1}	—	July 22, 2007	Siding Spring	SSS	·	1.5 km	MPC · JPL
754428	2016 QM_{1}	—	October 31, 2011	Mount Lemmon	Mount Lemmon Survey	H	410 m	MPC · JPL
754429	2016 QT_{1}	—	December 23, 2014	Catalina	CSS	H	390 m	MPC · JPL
754430	2016 QU_{3}	—	January 20, 2015	Haleakala	Pan-STARRS 1	·	1.1 km	MPC · JPL
754431	2016 QE_{6}	—	January 11, 2015	Haleakala	Pan-STARRS 1	H	470 m	MPC · JPL
754432	2016 QN_{7}	—	August 30, 2005	Kitt Peak	Spacewatch	·	2.2 km	MPC · JPL
754433	2016 QC_{8}	—	August 14, 2012	Haleakala	Pan-STARRS 1	·	800 m	MPC · JPL
754434	2016 QY_{9}	—	March 10, 2011	Mount Lemmon	Mount Lemmon Survey	·	790 m	MPC · JPL
754435	2016 QN_{15}	—	September 1, 2005	Palomar	NEAT	THB	2.1 km	MPC · JPL
754436	2016 QN_{16}	—	January 30, 2012	Haleakala	Pan-STARRS 1	V	590 m	MPC · JPL
754437	2016 QL_{18}	—	August 27, 2012	Haleakala	Pan-STARRS 1	·	790 m	MPC · JPL
754438	2016 QF_{20}	—	November 2, 2013	Mount Lemmon	Mount Lemmon Survey	·	610 m	MPC · JPL
754439	2016 QQ_{21}	—	August 26, 2016	Haleakala	Pan-STARRS 1	·	1.7 km	MPC · JPL
754440	2016 QN_{27}	—	September 17, 2009	Mount Lemmon	Mount Lemmon Survey	(2076)	570 m	MPC · JPL
754441	2016 QE_{29}	—	July 7, 2016	Haleakala	Pan-STARRS 1	·	1.0 km	MPC · JPL
754442	2016 QL_{30}	—	October 20, 2012	Kitt Peak	Spacewatch	NEM	1.4 km	MPC · JPL
754443	2016 QK_{32}	—	July 11, 2016	Haleakala	Pan-STARRS 1	EOS	1.7 km	MPC · JPL
754444	2016 QO_{32}	—	January 25, 2014	Haleakala	Pan-STARRS 1	·	1.5 km	MPC · JPL
754445	2016 QG_{33}	—	August 12, 2012	Mayhill-ISON	L. Elenin	·	1.1 km	MPC · JPL
754446	2016 QR_{34}	—	October 9, 2008	Mount Lemmon	Mount Lemmon Survey	·	990 m	MPC · JPL
754447	2016 QF_{35}	—	January 25, 2015	Haleakala	Pan-STARRS 1	THB	2.5 km	MPC · JPL
754448	2016 QF_{36}	—	March 5, 2008	Kitt Peak	Spacewatch	·	1.0 km	MPC · JPL
754449	2016 QR_{36}	—	August 3, 2016	Haleakala	Pan-STARRS 1	·	980 m	MPC · JPL
754450	2016 QB_{37}	—	August 27, 2005	Palomar	NEAT	THM	2.3 km	MPC · JPL
754451	2016 QX_{38}	—	July 11, 2016	Haleakala	Pan-STARRS 1	V	560 m	MPC · JPL
754452	2016 QH_{40}	—	June 14, 2012	Mount Lemmon	Mount Lemmon Survey	·	980 m	MPC · JPL
754453	2016 QT_{42}	—	September 27, 2011	Mount Lemmon	Mount Lemmon Survey	·	2.5 km	MPC · JPL
754454	2016 QN_{45}	—	January 9, 2015	Haleakala	Pan-STARRS 1	H	440 m	MPC · JPL
754455	2016 QW_{46}	—	August 12, 2012	Siding Spring	SSS	·	950 m	MPC · JPL
754456	2016 QM_{48}	—	August 31, 2005	Kitt Peak	Spacewatch	·	760 m	MPC · JPL
754457	2016 QX_{49}	—	November 30, 2011	Mount Lemmon	Mount Lemmon Survey	·	3.0 km	MPC · JPL
754458	2016 QZ_{49}	—	December 27, 2005	Kitt Peak	Spacewatch	·	650 m	MPC · JPL
754459	2016 QV_{54}	—	August 15, 2009	Kitt Peak	Spacewatch	·	700 m	MPC · JPL
754460	2016 QO_{55}	—	August 14, 2016	Haleakala	Pan-STARRS 1	·	900 m	MPC · JPL
754461	2016 QM_{63}	—	September 15, 2006	Kitt Peak	Spacewatch	·	560 m	MPC · JPL
754462	2016 QC_{65}	—	July 11, 2016	Haleakala	Pan-STARRS 1	·	1.1 km	MPC · JPL
754463	2016 QN_{66}	—	October 3, 2013	Mount Lemmon	Mount Lemmon Survey	·	540 m	MPC · JPL
754464	2016 QH_{68}	—	February 27, 2008	Mount Lemmon	Mount Lemmon Survey	ERI	1.3 km	MPC · JPL
754465	2016 QT_{68}	—	March 16, 2012	Mount Lemmon	Mount Lemmon Survey	·	490 m	MPC · JPL
754466	2016 QX_{68}	—	February 2, 2008	Kitt Peak	Spacewatch	·	610 m	MPC · JPL
754467	2016 QW_{69}	—	February 10, 2014	Haleakala	Pan-STARRS 1	EOS	1.4 km	MPC · JPL
754468	2016 QP_{70}	—	December 23, 2012	Haleakala	Pan-STARRS 1	·	2.3 km	MPC · JPL
754469	2016 QJ_{71}	—	January 23, 2015	Haleakala	Pan-STARRS 1	H	370 m	MPC · JPL
754470	2016 QZ_{75}	—	July 17, 2016	Haleakala	Pan-STARRS 1	·	1.3 km	MPC · JPL
754471	2016 QC_{76}	—	January 18, 2015	Haleakala	Pan-STARRS 1	H	460 m	MPC · JPL
754472	2016 QP_{77}	—	September 16, 2012	Catalina	CSS	·	850 m	MPC · JPL
754473	2016 QN_{79}	—	March 2, 2009	Kitt Peak	Spacewatch	·	1.4 km	MPC · JPL
754474	2016 QO_{82}	—	September 7, 2008	Mount Lemmon	Mount Lemmon Survey	H	350 m	MPC · JPL
754475	2016 QW_{84}	—	August 18, 2009	Kitt Peak	Spacewatch	·	690 m	MPC · JPL
754476	2016 QG_{85}	—	February 26, 2011	Mount Lemmon	Mount Lemmon Survey	·	990 m	MPC · JPL
754477	2016 QX_{85}	—	February 11, 2004	Kitt Peak	Spacewatch	H	540 m	MPC · JPL
754478	2016 QK_{86}	—	October 8, 2012	Catalina	CSS	PHO	840 m	MPC · JPL
754479	2016 QZ_{86}	—	August 29, 2016	Mount Lemmon	Mount Lemmon Survey	PHO	830 m	MPC · JPL
754480	2016 QR_{87}	—	December 10, 2012	Haleakala	Pan-STARRS 1	EUN	930 m	MPC · JPL
754481	2016 QS_{87}	—	June 13, 2015	Haleakala	Pan-STARRS 1	·	1.1 km	MPC · JPL
754482	2016 QC_{88}	—	April 29, 2011	Kitt Peak	Spacewatch	MAR	690 m	MPC · JPL
754483	2016 QK_{89}	—	August 16, 2016	Haleakala	Pan-STARRS 1	·	980 m	MPC · JPL
754484	2016 QA_{91}	—	May 13, 2015	Kitt Peak	Spacewatch	·	1.3 km	MPC · JPL
754485	2016 QE_{93}	—	September 26, 1995	Kitt Peak	Spacewatch	EUN	760 m	MPC · JPL
754486	2016 QR_{94}	—	August 30, 2016	Haleakala	Pan-STARRS 1	·	1.1 km	MPC · JPL
754487	2016 QY_{95}	—	August 28, 2016	Mount Lemmon	Mount Lemmon Survey	·	920 m	MPC · JPL
754488	2016 QR_{100}	—	August 28, 2016	Mount Lemmon	Mount Lemmon Survey	·	830 m	MPC · JPL
754489	2016 QH_{101}	—	August 28, 2016	Mount Lemmon	Mount Lemmon Survey	NYS	780 m	MPC · JPL
754490	2016 QZ_{104}	—	August 30, 2016	Mount Lemmon	Mount Lemmon Survey	·	990 m	MPC · JPL
754491	2016 QO_{105}	—	August 27, 2016	Haleakala	Pan-STARRS 1	V	550 m	MPC · JPL
754492	2016 QU_{105}	—	August 28, 2016	Mount Lemmon	Mount Lemmon Survey	·	1.0 km	MPC · JPL
754493	2016 QH_{109}	—	August 30, 2016	Haleakala	Pan-STARRS 1	·	930 m	MPC · JPL
754494	2016 QZ_{110}	—	August 30, 2016	Mount Lemmon	Mount Lemmon Survey	·	890 m	MPC · JPL
754495	2016 QB_{111}	—	August 26, 2016	Haleakala	Pan-STARRS 1	·	790 m	MPC · JPL
754496	2016 QS_{113}	—	August 30, 2016	Mount Lemmon	Mount Lemmon Survey	·	630 m	MPC · JPL
754497	2016 QW_{113}	—	August 28, 2016	Mount Lemmon	Mount Lemmon Survey	(5)	680 m	MPC · JPL
754498	2016 QZ_{113}	—	August 16, 2016	Haleakala	Pan-STARRS 1	·	960 m	MPC · JPL
754499	2016 QL_{114}	—	August 30, 2016	Haleakala	Pan-STARRS 1	PHO	790 m	MPC · JPL
754500	2016 QN_{114}	—	August 30, 2016	Haleakala	Pan-STARRS 1	·	1.0 km	MPC · JPL

== 754501–754600 ==
back to top

Designation			Discovery			Properties		Ref
Permanent	Provisional	Named after	Date	Site	Discoverer(s)	Category	Diam.	Ref
754501	2016 QC_{115}	—	August 28, 2016	Mount Lemmon	Mount Lemmon Survey	·	820 m	MPC · JPL
754502	2016 QG_{117}	—	August 30, 2016	Mount Lemmon	Mount Lemmon Survey	·	880 m	MPC · JPL
754503	2016 QO_{117}	—	November 6, 2012	Kitt Peak	Spacewatch	(5)	1.0 km	MPC · JPL
754504	2016 QS_{117}	—	August 26, 2016	Mount Lemmon	Mount Lemmon Survey	·	840 m	MPC · JPL
754505	2016 QX_{117}	—	August 29, 2016	Mount Lemmon	Mount Lemmon Survey	V	400 m	MPC · JPL
754506	2016 QK_{118}	—	August 28, 2016	Mount Lemmon	Mount Lemmon Survey	·	800 m	MPC · JPL
754507	2016 QF_{119}	—	August 26, 2016	Haleakala	Pan-STARRS 1	PHO	640 m	MPC · JPL
754508	2016 QB_{121}	—	August 29, 2016	Mount Lemmon	Mount Lemmon Survey	·	760 m	MPC · JPL
754509	2016 QJ_{127}	—	August 29, 2016	Mount Lemmon	Mount Lemmon Survey	·	2.2 km	MPC · JPL
754510	2016 QD_{131}	—	August 27, 2016	Haleakala	Pan-STARRS 1	H	470 m	MPC · JPL
754511	2016 QT_{132}	—	February 28, 2014	Haleakala	Pan-STARRS 1	THM	1.9 km	MPC · JPL
754512	2016 QV_{144}	—	August 27, 2016	Haleakala	Pan-STARRS 1	·	2.3 km	MPC · JPL
754513	2016 QJ_{146}	—	August 26, 2016	Mount Lemmon	Mount Lemmon Survey	·	500 m	MPC · JPL
754514	2016 RA_{3}	—	August 2, 2016	Haleakala	Pan-STARRS 1	·	3.0 km	MPC · JPL
754515	2016 RO_{3}	—	August 16, 2009	Catalina	CSS	·	700 m	MPC · JPL
754516	2016 RB_{8}	—	August 27, 2012	Haleakala	Pan-STARRS 1	·	930 m	MPC · JPL
754517	2016 RS_{8}	—	August 14, 2012	Haleakala	Pan-STARRS 1	·	610 m	MPC · JPL
754518	2016 RU_{10}	—	September 13, 2007	Catalina	CSS	JUN	980 m	MPC · JPL
754519	2016 RH_{12}	—	December 13, 2006	Mount Lemmon	Mount Lemmon Survey	·	1.1 km	MPC · JPL
754520	2016 RM_{18}	—	September 28, 2003	Apache Point	SDSS	H	360 m	MPC · JPL
754521	2016 RU_{18}	—	September 25, 2011	Haleakala	Pan-STARRS 1	H	410 m	MPC · JPL
754522	2016 RB_{21}	—	September 5, 2008	Kitt Peak	Spacewatch	·	1.0 km	MPC · JPL
754523	2016 RW_{21}	—	September 7, 2008	Mount Lemmon	Mount Lemmon Survey	·	760 m	MPC · JPL
754524	2016 RC_{26}	—	October 10, 2012	Haleakala	Pan-STARRS 1	(5)	910 m	MPC · JPL
754525	2016 RA_{27}	—	February 20, 2014	Mount Lemmon	Mount Lemmon Survey	·	1.5 km	MPC · JPL
754526	2016 RW_{27}	—	July 11, 2016	Mount Lemmon	Mount Lemmon Survey	·	3.6 km	MPC · JPL
754527	2016 RZ_{27}	—	November 21, 2014	Haleakala	Pan-STARRS 1	H	480 m	MPC · JPL
754528	2016 RP_{28}	—	July 14, 2016	Haleakala	Pan-STARRS 1	·	840 m	MPC · JPL
754529	2016 RQ_{29}	—	March 25, 2014	Kitt Peak	Spacewatch	·	1.3 km	MPC · JPL
754530	2016 RD_{30}	—	March 1, 2009	Kitt Peak	Spacewatch	·	2.6 km	MPC · JPL
754531	2016 RH_{31}	—	February 28, 2014	Haleakala	Pan-STARRS 1	T_{j} (2.99) · 3:2	4.8 km	MPC · JPL
754532	2016 RT_{31}	—	February 11, 2011	Mount Lemmon	Mount Lemmon Survey	·	930 m	MPC · JPL
754533	2016 RN_{36}	—	July 14, 2016	Haleakala	Pan-STARRS 1	·	650 m	MPC · JPL
754534	2016 RL_{38}	—	February 24, 2015	Haleakala	Pan-STARRS 1	·	750 m	MPC · JPL
754535	2016 RN_{39}	—	September 29, 2008	Mount Lemmon	Mount Lemmon Survey	·	890 m	MPC · JPL
754536	2016 RV_{43}	—	September 10, 2016	Mount Lemmon	Mount Lemmon Survey	EUN	790 m	MPC · JPL
754537	2016 RN_{45}	—	September 21, 2011	Kitt Peak	Spacewatch	·	1.9 km	MPC · JPL
754538	2016 RJ_{46}	—	September 12, 2016	Haleakala	Pan-STARRS 1	PHO	750 m	MPC · JPL
754539	2016 RN_{47}	—	October 6, 2012	Haleakala	Pan-STARRS 1	·	1.3 km	MPC · JPL
754540	2016 RP_{47}	—	September 4, 2016	Mount Lemmon	Mount Lemmon Survey	EUN	920 m	MPC · JPL
754541	2016 RR_{47}	—	October 13, 2005	Kitt Peak	Spacewatch	VER	2.0 km	MPC · JPL
754542	2016 RU_{47}	—	September 4, 2011	Haleakala	Pan-STARRS 1	EOS	1.4 km	MPC · JPL
754543	2016 RX_{47}	—	February 9, 2014	Haleakala	Pan-STARRS 1	·	910 m	MPC · JPL
754544	2016 RX_{48}	—	September 11, 2016	Mount Lemmon	Mount Lemmon Survey	·	840 m	MPC · JPL
754545	2016 RA_{49}	—	November 14, 2012	Kitt Peak	Spacewatch	·	960 m	MPC · JPL
754546	2016 RO_{50}	—	September 11, 2016	Mount Lemmon	Mount Lemmon Survey	MAR	920 m	MPC · JPL
754547	2016 RU_{50}	—	September 8, 2016	Haleakala	Pan-STARRS 1	EUN	1.0 km	MPC · JPL
754548	2016 RH_{51}	—	September 8, 2016	Haleakala	Pan-STARRS 1	·	1.2 km	MPC · JPL
754549	2016 RE_{52}	—	September 12, 2016	Haleakala	Pan-STARRS 1	·	1.1 km	MPC · JPL
754550	2016 RK_{55}	—	September 12, 2016	Haleakala	Pan-STARRS 1	·	880 m	MPC · JPL
754551	2016 RV_{55}	—	September 2, 2016	Mount Lemmon	Mount Lemmon Survey	(5)	860 m	MPC · JPL
754552	2016 RP_{57}	—	September 30, 1995	Kitt Peak	Spacewatch	KON	2.4 km	MPC · JPL
754553	2016 RZ_{59}	—	September 6, 2016	Mount Lemmon	Mount Lemmon Survey	H	360 m	MPC · JPL
754554	2016 RJ_{60}	—	September 4, 2016	Mount Lemmon	Mount Lemmon Survey	·	920 m	MPC · JPL
754555	2016 RQ_{60}	—	September 6, 2016	Mount Lemmon	Mount Lemmon Survey	·	2.3 km	MPC · JPL
754556	2016 RT_{60}	—	September 10, 2016	Mount Lemmon	Mount Lemmon Survey	·	2.2 km	MPC · JPL
754557	2016 RM_{67}	—	September 8, 2016	Haleakala	Pan-STARRS 1	·	1.1 km	MPC · JPL
754558	2016 RP_{67}	—	September 4, 2016	Mount Lemmon	Mount Lemmon Survey	HNS	900 m	MPC · JPL
754559	2016 RE_{68}	—	September 10, 2016	Mount Lemmon	Mount Lemmon Survey	·	700 m	MPC · JPL
754560	2016 RK_{68}	—	September 2, 2016	Mount Lemmon	Mount Lemmon Survey	BRG	1.2 km	MPC · JPL
754561	2016 RM_{70}	—	September 2, 2016	Mount Lemmon	Mount Lemmon Survey	EUN	800 m	MPC · JPL
754562	2016 RN_{70}	—	September 11, 2016	Mount Lemmon	Mount Lemmon Survey	·	480 m	MPC · JPL
754563	2016 RQ_{71}	—	September 12, 2016	Haleakala	Pan-STARRS 1	·	980 m	MPC · JPL
754564	2016 SD_{5}	—	January 23, 2014	Mount Lemmon	Mount Lemmon Survey	·	880 m	MPC · JPL
754565	2016 SE_{7}	—	March 28, 2015	Haleakala	Pan-STARRS 1	·	1.6 km	MPC · JPL
754566	2016 SY_{17}	—	September 17, 2001	Anderson Mesa	LONEOS	PHO	1.1 km	MPC · JPL
754567	2016 SM_{19}	—	November 21, 2008	Pla D'Arguines	R. Ferrando, Ferrando, M.	·	910 m	MPC · JPL
754568	2016 SV_{20}	—	August 17, 2006	Palomar	NEAT	·	520 m	MPC · JPL
754569	2016 SF_{23}	—	August 10, 2016	Haleakala	Pan-STARRS 1	·	850 m	MPC · JPL
754570	2016 ST_{29}	—	September 25, 2016	Mount Lemmon	Mount Lemmon Survey	·	1.0 km	MPC · JPL
754571	2016 SU_{29}	—	April 13, 2015	Mount Lemmon	Mount Lemmon Survey	EUN	650 m	MPC · JPL
754572	2016 SP_{30}	—	July 30, 2008	Siding Spring	SSS	·	1.1 km	MPC · JPL
754573	2016 SU_{31}	—	March 28, 2015	Haleakala	Pan-STARRS 1	KRM	1.6 km	MPC · JPL
754574	2016 SW_{31}	—	September 26, 2016	Haleakala	Pan-STARRS 1	·	930 m	MPC · JPL
754575	2016 SX_{33}	—	February 16, 2015	Haleakala	Pan-STARRS 1	NYS	870 m	MPC · JPL
754576	2016 SA_{35}	—	August 20, 2003	Campo Imperatore	CINEOS	·	1.5 km	MPC · JPL
754577	2016 SC_{35}	—	November 25, 2005	Kitt Peak	Spacewatch	·	1.2 km	MPC · JPL
754578	2016 SQ_{37}	—	March 27, 2011	Mount Lemmon	Mount Lemmon Survey	·	1.4 km	MPC · JPL
754579	2016 SR_{37}	—	October 15, 2012	Kitt Peak	Spacewatch	·	970 m	MPC · JPL
754580	2016 SH_{39}	—	March 29, 2011	Mount Lemmon	Mount Lemmon Survey	·	1.1 km	MPC · JPL
754581	2016 SU_{40}	—	November 8, 2008	Mount Lemmon	Mount Lemmon Survey	·	840 m	MPC · JPL
754582	2016 ST_{43}	—	September 24, 2008	Mount Lemmon	Mount Lemmon Survey	·	760 m	MPC · JPL
754583	2016 SV_{44}	—	March 8, 2014	Mount Lemmon	Mount Lemmon Survey	HNS	1.0 km	MPC · JPL
754584	2016 SV_{46}	—	March 25, 2015	Haleakala	Pan-STARRS 1	H	450 m	MPC · JPL
754585	2016 SL_{47}	—	September 25, 2016	Haleakala	Pan-STARRS 1	·	850 m	MPC · JPL
754586	2016 SQ_{47}	—	November 15, 2012	Mount Lemmon	Mount Lemmon Survey	·	1.6 km	MPC · JPL
754587	2016 SU_{48}	—	December 22, 2012	Haleakala	Pan-STARRS 1	526	2.0 km	MPC · JPL
754588	2016 SQ_{49}	—	September 27, 2016	Haleakala	Pan-STARRS 1	·	1.2 km	MPC · JPL
754589	2016 SH_{50}	—	September 16, 2012	Kitt Peak	Spacewatch	·	770 m	MPC · JPL
754590	2016 SJ_{50}	—	October 17, 2012	Haleakala	Pan-STARRS 1	·	760 m	MPC · JPL
754591	2016 SK_{51}	—	September 27, 2016	Haleakala	Pan-STARRS 1	·	1.2 km	MPC · JPL
754592	2016 SD_{52}	—	September 25, 2016	Mount Lemmon	Mount Lemmon Survey	·	1.9 km	MPC · JPL
754593	2016 ST_{54}	—	March 28, 2015	Haleakala	Pan-STARRS 1	EUN	1 km	MPC · JPL
754594	2016 SQ_{72}	—	September 25, 2016	Haleakala	Pan-STARRS 1	·	870 m	MPC · JPL
754595	2016 SD_{75}	—	September 26, 2016	Haleakala	Pan-STARRS 1	·	1.0 km	MPC · JPL
754596	2016 SF_{75}	—	September 25, 2016	Mount Lemmon	Mount Lemmon Survey	·	1.1 km	MPC · JPL
754597	2016 SG_{75}	—	September 22, 2016	Mount Lemmon	Mount Lemmon Survey	·	1.3 km	MPC · JPL
754598	2016 SH_{75}	—	September 27, 2016	Mount Lemmon	Mount Lemmon Survey	·	1.3 km	MPC · JPL
754599	2016 SL_{75}	—	September 25, 2016	Mount Lemmon	Mount Lemmon Survey	·	590 m	MPC · JPL
754600	2016 SQ_{75}	—	September 30, 2016	Kitt Peak	Spacewatch	H	400 m	MPC · JPL

== 754601–754700 ==
back to top

Designation			Discovery			Properties		Ref
Permanent	Provisional	Named after	Date	Site	Discoverer(s)	Category	Diam.	Ref
754601	2016 SZ_{78}	—	September 22, 2016	Mount Lemmon	Mount Lemmon Survey	·	890 m	MPC · JPL
754602	2016 SY_{81}	—	September 27, 2016	Haleakala	Pan-STARRS 1	EUN	690 m	MPC · JPL
754603	2016 SS_{84}	—	September 25, 2016	Mount Lemmon	Mount Lemmon Survey	EOS	1.5 km	MPC · JPL
754604	2016 SZ_{84}	—	September 27, 2016	Haleakala	Pan-STARRS 1	(5)	780 m	MPC · JPL
754605	2016 SL_{85}	—	September 25, 2016	Mount Lemmon	Mount Lemmon Survey	EUN	750 m	MPC · JPL
754606	2016 SM_{85}	—	September 25, 2016	Mount Lemmon	Mount Lemmon Survey	·	880 m	MPC · JPL
754607	2016 SN_{85}	—	September 25, 2016	Haleakala	Pan-STARRS 1	RAF	680 m	MPC · JPL
754608	2016 SQ_{86}	—	September 25, 2016	Haleakala	Pan-STARRS 1	·	760 m	MPC · JPL
754609	2016 SR_{86}	—	September 30, 2016	Haleakala	Pan-STARRS 1	MAR	690 m	MPC · JPL
754610	2016 SR_{88}	—	September 26, 2016	Haleakala	Pan-STARRS 1	·	990 m	MPC · JPL
754611	2016 TN	—	December 31, 2008	Mount Lemmon	Mount Lemmon Survey	(5)	1.3 km	MPC · JPL
754612	2016 TX	—	September 23, 2008	Mount Lemmon	Mount Lemmon Survey	H	450 m	MPC · JPL
754613	2016 TC_{1}	—	August 27, 2016	Haleakala	Pan-STARRS 1	VER	2.2 km	MPC · JPL
754614	2016 TR_{1}	—	September 28, 2003	Apache Point	SDSS	·	1.5 km	MPC · JPL
754615	2016 TB_{3}	—	January 1, 2014	Mount Lemmon	Mount Lemmon Survey	HNS	1.3 km	MPC · JPL
754616	2016 TN_{3}	—	September 29, 2011	Mount Lemmon	Mount Lemmon Survey	·	1.5 km	MPC · JPL
754617	2016 TS_{3}	—	September 20, 2003	Palomar	NEAT	H	460 m	MPC · JPL
754618	2016 TK_{4}	—	March 17, 2015	Mount Lemmon	Mount Lemmon Survey	MAS	630 m	MPC · JPL
754619	2016 TU_{5}	—	August 2, 2016	Haleakala	Pan-STARRS 1	·	1.1 km	MPC · JPL
754620	2016 TM_{6}	—	October 2, 2016	Mount Lemmon	Mount Lemmon Survey	EUN	1.1 km	MPC · JPL
754621	2016 TY_{6}	—	September 21, 2011	Haleakala	Pan-STARRS 1	·	1.7 km	MPC · JPL
754622	2016 TY_{7}	—	August 17, 2016	Haleakala	Pan-STARRS 1	H	440 m	MPC · JPL
754623	2016 TL_{8}	—	November 19, 2008	Kitt Peak	Spacewatch	(5)	970 m	MPC · JPL
754624	2016 TK_{13}	—	August 10, 2016	Haleakala	Pan-STARRS 1	·	1.0 km	MPC · JPL
754625	2016 TH_{14}	—	June 16, 2012	Haleakala	Pan-STARRS 1	·	1.1 km	MPC · JPL
754626	2016 TN_{14}	—	January 18, 2004	Kitt Peak	Spacewatch	H	420 m	MPC · JPL
754627	2016 TQ_{16}	—	October 5, 2016	Mount Lemmon	Mount Lemmon Survey	MAR	750 m	MPC · JPL
754628	2016 TA_{17}	—	October 10, 2012	Haleakala	Pan-STARRS 1	EUN	940 m	MPC · JPL
754629	2016 TY_{20}	—	October 4, 2004	Kitt Peak	Spacewatch	·	770 m	MPC · JPL
754630	2016 TK_{22}	—	August 24, 2011	Haleakala	Pan-STARRS 1	KOR	1.2 km	MPC · JPL
754631	2016 TV_{22}	—	August 2, 2016	Haleakala	Pan-STARRS 1	·	920 m	MPC · JPL
754632	2016 TE_{23}	—	January 1, 2014	Haleakala	Pan-STARRS 1	·	1.0 km	MPC · JPL
754633	2016 TM_{23}	—	January 18, 2013	Mount Lemmon	Mount Lemmon Survey	HYG	2.5 km	MPC · JPL
754634	2016 TM_{24}	—	November 8, 2008	Mount Lemmon	Mount Lemmon Survey	H	390 m	MPC · JPL
754635	2016 TN_{24}	—	November 20, 2003	Kitt Peak	Spacewatch	·	1.5 km	MPC · JPL
754636	2016 TP_{24}	—	August 16, 2016	Haleakala	Pan-STARRS 1	(5)	1.1 km	MPC · JPL
754637	2016 TC_{25}	—	August 29, 2016	Mount Lemmon	Mount Lemmon Survey	·	1.0 km	MPC · JPL
754638	2016 TR_{26}	—	July 20, 2016	Haleakala	Pan-STARRS 1	HNS	1.3 km	MPC · JPL
754639	2016 TG_{29}	—	September 27, 2016	Mount Lemmon	Mount Lemmon Survey	·	1.1 km	MPC · JPL
754640	2016 TD_{30}	—	September 10, 2016	Mount Lemmon	Mount Lemmon Survey	·	1.7 km	MPC · JPL
754641	2016 TG_{30}	—	April 1, 2015	Haleakala	Pan-STARRS 1	H	450 m	MPC · JPL
754642	2016 TS_{32}	—	October 10, 2012	Haleakala	Pan-STARRS 1	·	1.1 km	MPC · JPL
754643	2016 TG_{33}	—	October 18, 2012	Haleakala	Pan-STARRS 1	·	1.1 km	MPC · JPL
754644	2016 TK_{33}	—	April 25, 2015	Haleakala	Pan-STARRS 1	·	1.6 km	MPC · JPL
754645	2016 TL_{38}	—	August 31, 2005	Kitt Peak	Spacewatch	·	1.1 km	MPC · JPL
754646	2016 TM_{39}	—	October 20, 2008	Kitt Peak	Spacewatch	·	680 m	MPC · JPL
754647	2016 TT_{42}	—	November 21, 2008	Kitt Peak	Spacewatch	·	860 m	MPC · JPL
754648	2016 TB_{44}	—	December 1, 2008	Mount Lemmon	Mount Lemmon Survey	·	1.1 km	MPC · JPL
754649	2016 TG_{44}	—	September 7, 1996	Kitt Peak	Spacewatch	·	500 m	MPC · JPL
754650	2016 TY_{46}	—	February 28, 2014	Haleakala	Pan-STARRS 1	·	1.1 km	MPC · JPL
754651	2016 TD_{47}	—	October 7, 2016	Mount Lemmon	Mount Lemmon Survey	·	1.0 km	MPC · JPL
754652	2016 TZ_{51}	—	September 27, 2016	Haleakala	Pan-STARRS 1	·	1.3 km	MPC · JPL
754653	2016 TM_{53}	—	January 9, 2007	Mount Lemmon	Mount Lemmon Survey	·	2.0 km	MPC · JPL
754654	2016 TU_{53}	—	January 15, 2013	Tenerife	ESA OGS	·	1.5 km	MPC · JPL
754655	2016 TC_{54}	—	April 4, 2014	Mount Lemmon	Mount Lemmon Survey	·	1.0 km	MPC · JPL
754656	2016 TM_{55}	—	April 11, 2015	Catalina	CSS	H	510 m	MPC · JPL
754657	2016 TU_{56}	—	January 3, 2012	Kitt Peak	Spacewatch	H	590 m	MPC · JPL
754658	2016 TH_{58}	—	February 26, 2014	Haleakala	Pan-STARRS 1	·	1.2 km	MPC · JPL
754659	2016 TL_{59}	—	December 15, 2006	Kitt Peak	Spacewatch	·	2.1 km	MPC · JPL
754660	2016 TO_{59}	—	December 30, 2007	Kitt Peak	Spacewatch	·	630 m	MPC · JPL
754661	2016 TO_{63}	—	November 16, 2006	Kitt Peak	Spacewatch	·	460 m	MPC · JPL
754662	2016 TC_{64}	—	October 17, 2012	Haleakala	Pan-STARRS 1	·	620 m	MPC · JPL
754663	2016 TN_{64}	—	April 23, 2014	Cerro Tololo	DECam	·	1.0 km	MPC · JPL
754664	2016 TS_{64}	—	October 7, 2016	Haleakala	Pan-STARRS 1	·	2.3 km	MPC · JPL
754665	2016 TA_{67}	—	August 10, 2016	Haleakala	Pan-STARRS 1	EUN	770 m	MPC · JPL
754666	2016 TD_{67}	—	February 18, 2010	Mount Lemmon	Mount Lemmon Survey	·	1.4 km	MPC · JPL
754667	2016 TK_{67}	—	October 10, 2012	Haleakala	Pan-STARRS 1	MAR	660 m	MPC · JPL
754668	2016 TS_{67}	—	October 18, 2012	Haleakala	Pan-STARRS 1	·	960 m	MPC · JPL
754669	2016 TB_{70}	—	October 2, 2016	Mount Lemmon	Mount Lemmon Survey	ADE	1.5 km	MPC · JPL
754670	2016 TN_{70}	—	September 21, 2012	Catalina	CSS	PHO	730 m	MPC · JPL
754671	2016 TJ_{71}	—	September 23, 2008	Kitt Peak	Spacewatch	·	940 m	MPC · JPL
754672	2016 TZ_{71}	—	June 25, 2015	Haleakala	Pan-STARRS 1	·	2.4 km	MPC · JPL
754673	2016 TM_{72}	—	August 14, 2012	Haleakala	Pan-STARRS 1	·	990 m	MPC · JPL
754674	2016 TW_{72}	—	October 13, 2007	Kitt Peak	Spacewatch	·	1.9 km	MPC · JPL
754675	2016 TR_{74}	—	August 2, 2016	Haleakala	Pan-STARRS 1	EUN	750 m	MPC · JPL
754676	2016 TB_{75}	—	September 30, 2016	Haleakala	Pan-STARRS 1	(1338) (FLO)	500 m	MPC · JPL
754677	2016 TM_{75}	—	October 20, 2012	Mount Lemmon	Mount Lemmon Survey	(5)	980 m	MPC · JPL
754678	2016 TR_{77}	—	October 19, 2003	Kitt Peak	Spacewatch	·	1.2 km	MPC · JPL
754679	2016 TK_{78}	—	September 17, 2003	Kitt Peak	Spacewatch	·	1.1 km	MPC · JPL
754680	2016 TY_{79}	—	October 20, 2012	Kitt Peak	Spacewatch	·	1.2 km	MPC · JPL
754681	2016 TE_{83}	—	October 27, 2012	Mount Lemmon	Mount Lemmon Survey	·	1.4 km	MPC · JPL
754682	2016 TD_{84}	—	October 10, 2007	Kitt Peak	Spacewatch	·	1.5 km	MPC · JPL
754683	2016 TY_{84}	—	April 19, 2015	Mount Lemmon	Mount Lemmon Survey	BAR	1.0 km	MPC · JPL
754684	2016 TC_{85}	—	September 13, 2016	Mount Lemmon	Mount Lemmon Survey	·	1.3 km	MPC · JPL
754685	2016 TU_{86}	—	October 1, 2005	Mount Lemmon	Mount Lemmon Survey	·	1.1 km	MPC · JPL
754686	2016 TC_{87}	—	January 2, 2009	Kitt Peak	Spacewatch	·	1.2 km	MPC · JPL
754687	2016 TE_{87}	—	October 21, 2009	Mount Lemmon	Mount Lemmon Survey	·	860 m	MPC · JPL
754688	2016 TJ_{89}	—	November 5, 2012	Catalina	CSS	·	1.3 km	MPC · JPL
754689	2016 TT_{89}	—	October 12, 2016	Haleakala	Pan-STARRS 1	·	1.2 km	MPC · JPL
754690	2016 TB_{90}	—	November 14, 2012	Kitt Peak	Spacewatch	·	670 m	MPC · JPL
754691	2016 TJ_{90}	—	October 12, 2016	Haleakala	Pan-STARRS 1	·	730 m	MPC · JPL
754692	2016 TX_{90}	—	May 20, 2015	Haleakala	Pan-STARRS 1	·	970 m	MPC · JPL
754693	2016 TA_{91}	—	September 11, 2007	Kitt Peak	Spacewatch	·	1.4 km	MPC · JPL
754694	2016 TC_{91}	—	November 18, 2008	Kitt Peak	Spacewatch	·	680 m	MPC · JPL
754695	2016 TZ_{91}	—	October 5, 2016	Mount Lemmon	Mount Lemmon Survey	·	4.2 km	MPC · JPL
754696	2016 TC_{92}	—	October 12, 2016	Mount Lemmon	Mount Lemmon Survey	·	1.5 km	MPC · JPL
754697	2016 TW_{92}	—	October 7, 2016	Mount Lemmon	Mount Lemmon Survey	H	470 m	MPC · JPL
754698	2016 TZ_{92}	—	February 6, 2014	Mount Lemmon	Mount Lemmon Survey	·	1.5 km	MPC · JPL
754699	2016 TW_{95}	—	October 2, 2016	Mount Lemmon	Mount Lemmon Survey	EUN	750 m	MPC · JPL
754700	2016 TY_{97}	—	November 28, 2013	Mount Lemmon	Mount Lemmon Survey	V	470 m	MPC · JPL

== 754701–754800 ==
back to top

Designation			Discovery			Properties		Ref
Permanent	Provisional	Named after	Date	Site	Discoverer(s)	Category	Diam.	Ref
754701	2016 TE_{98}	—	June 19, 2015	Haleakala	Pan-STARRS 1	BRA	1.5 km	MPC · JPL
754702	2016 TJ_{98}	—	October 25, 2012	Kitt Peak	Spacewatch	·	1.1 km	MPC · JPL
754703	2016 TM_{98}	—	October 18, 2012	Mount Lemmon	Mount Lemmon Survey	·	1.0 km	MPC · JPL
754704	2016 TO_{101}	—	October 5, 2016	Mount Lemmon	Mount Lemmon Survey	PHO	880 m	MPC · JPL
754705	2016 TE_{102}	—	October 9, 2016	Mount Lemmon	Mount Lemmon Survey	·	1.1 km	MPC · JPL
754706	2016 TV_{103}	—	October 2, 2016	Mount Lemmon	Mount Lemmon Survey	·	1.2 km	MPC · JPL
754707	2016 TY_{103}	—	October 8, 2016	Haleakala	Pan-STARRS 1	·	1.2 km	MPC · JPL
754708	2016 TB_{105}	—	October 12, 2016	Haleakala	Pan-STARRS 1	·	690 m	MPC · JPL
754709	2016 TP_{105}	—	October 7, 2016	Haleakala	Pan-STARRS 1	·	1.1 km	MPC · JPL
754710	2016 TU_{105}	—	October 13, 2016	Haleakala	Pan-STARRS 1	·	1.0 km	MPC · JPL
754711	2016 TM_{107}	—	October 5, 2016	Mount Lemmon	Mount Lemmon Survey	·	860 m	MPC · JPL
754712	2016 TQ_{109}	—	October 10, 2016	Haleakala	Pan-STARRS 1	EUN	850 m	MPC · JPL
754713	2016 TV_{114}	—	October 9, 2016	Haleakala	Pan-STARRS 1	·	1.3 km	MPC · JPL
754714	2016 TO_{116}	—	October 8, 2016	Haleakala	Pan-STARRS 1	·	1.3 km	MPC · JPL
754715	2016 TN_{118}	—	July 2, 2013	Haleakala	Pan-STARRS 1	H	540 m	MPC · JPL
754716	2016 TW_{118}	—	October 7, 2016	Haleakala	Pan-STARRS 1	·	950 m	MPC · JPL
754717	2016 TK_{119}	—	October 1, 2016	Mount Lemmon	Mount Lemmon Survey	EUN	810 m	MPC · JPL
754718	2016 TV_{120}	—	September 22, 2016	Mount Lemmon	Mount Lemmon Survey	·	2.4 km	MPC · JPL
754719	2016 TS_{121}	—	October 8, 2016	Haleakala	Pan-STARRS 1	(1547)	1.3 km	MPC · JPL
754720	2016 TX_{121}	—	October 9, 2016	Mount Lemmon	Mount Lemmon Survey	H	450 m	MPC · JPL
754721	2016 TL_{122}	—	October 13, 2016	Haleakala	Pan-STARRS 1	·	1.2 km	MPC · JPL
754722	2016 TC_{123}	—	October 13, 2016	Mount Lemmon	Mount Lemmon Survey	EUN	930 m	MPC · JPL
754723	2016 TG_{123}	—	October 7, 2016	Haleakala	Pan-STARRS 1	(5)	860 m	MPC · JPL
754724	2016 TG_{124}	—	October 9, 2016	Mount Lemmon	Mount Lemmon Survey	·	2.3 km	MPC · JPL
754725	2016 TN_{124}	—	October 7, 2016	Haleakala	Pan-STARRS 1	·	860 m	MPC · JPL
754726	2016 TF_{125}	—	January 7, 2013	Haleakala	Pan-STARRS 1	·	1.2 km	MPC · JPL
754727	2016 TH_{127}	—	October 2, 2016	Mount Lemmon	Mount Lemmon Survey	·	1.2 km	MPC · JPL
754728	2016 TB_{129}	—	October 10, 2016	Haleakala	Pan-STARRS 1	·	1.1 km	MPC · JPL
754729	2016 TV_{130}	—	October 10, 2016	Haleakala	Pan-STARRS 1	MAR	730 m	MPC · JPL
754730	2016 TT_{131}	—	October 2, 2016	Mount Lemmon	Mount Lemmon Survey	·	1.1 km	MPC · JPL
754731	2016 TZ_{132}	—	October 2, 2016	Mount Lemmon	Mount Lemmon Survey	·	870 m	MPC · JPL
754732	2016 TZ_{133}	—	October 7, 2016	Haleakala	Pan-STARRS 1	·	990 m	MPC · JPL
754733	2016 TJ_{134}	—	October 2, 2016	Mount Lemmon	Mount Lemmon Survey	EUN	800 m	MPC · JPL
754734	2016 TY_{134}	—	October 12, 2016	Mount Lemmon	Mount Lemmon Survey	·	1.0 km	MPC · JPL
754735	2016 TK_{137}	—	October 10, 2016	Mount Lemmon	Mount Lemmon Survey	HNS	900 m	MPC · JPL
754736	2016 TG_{138}	—	October 13, 2016	Haleakala	Pan-STARRS 1	·	970 m	MPC · JPL
754737	2016 TT_{138}	—	October 9, 2016	Haleakala	Pan-STARRS 1	·	990 m	MPC · JPL
754738	2016 TV_{138}	—	October 13, 2016	Mount Lemmon	Mount Lemmon Survey	·	750 m	MPC · JPL
754739	2016 TX_{138}	—	October 12, 2016	Mount Lemmon	Mount Lemmon Survey	MAR	900 m	MPC · JPL
754740	2016 TZ_{138}	—	October 13, 2016	Mount Lemmon	Mount Lemmon Survey	HNS	980 m	MPC · JPL
754741	2016 TC_{139}	—	October 7, 2016	Haleakala	Pan-STARRS 1	(5)	800 m	MPC · JPL
754742	2016 TJ_{139}	—	October 1, 2016	Mount Lemmon	Mount Lemmon Survey	·	950 m	MPC · JPL
754743	2016 TL_{139}	—	October 3, 2016	XuYi	PMO NEO Survey Program	·	700 m	MPC · JPL
754744	2016 TP_{139}	—	October 12, 2016	Mount Lemmon	Mount Lemmon Survey	·	1.2 km	MPC · JPL
754745	2016 TZ_{144}	—	October 6, 2016	Haleakala	Pan-STARRS 1	·	880 m	MPC · JPL
754746	2016 TP_{145}	—	October 8, 2016	Haleakala	Pan-STARRS 1	·	990 m	MPC · JPL
754747	2016 TX_{147}	—	October 12, 2016	Haleakala	Pan-STARRS 1	·	860 m	MPC · JPL
754748	2016 TA_{148}	—	October 13, 2016	Haleakala	Pan-STARRS 1	·	1.0 km	MPC · JPL
754749	2016 TT_{148}	—	October 13, 2016	Mount Lemmon	Mount Lemmon Survey	·	1.1 km	MPC · JPL
754750	2016 TF_{150}	—	October 4, 2016	Mount Lemmon	Mount Lemmon Survey	·	1.2 km	MPC · JPL
754751	2016 TQ_{150}	—	October 7, 2016	Haleakala	Pan-STARRS 1	·	640 m	MPC · JPL
754752	2016 TY_{150}	—	October 6, 2016	Haleakala	Pan-STARRS 1	·	950 m	MPC · JPL
754753	2016 TH_{151}	—	October 7, 2016	Mount Lemmon	Mount Lemmon Survey	·	660 m	MPC · JPL
754754	2016 TK_{151}	—	October 13, 2016	Haleakala	Pan-STARRS 1	·	1.2 km	MPC · JPL
754755	2016 TC_{154}	—	October 9, 2016	Haleakala	Pan-STARRS 1	·	1.1 km	MPC · JPL
754756	2016 TO_{159}	—	August 13, 2012	Siding Spring	SSS	·	970 m	MPC · JPL
754757	2016 TN_{169}	—	October 7, 2016	Mount Lemmon	Mount Lemmon Survey	H	440 m	MPC · JPL
754758	2016 TY_{184}	—	October 2, 2016	Mount Lemmon	Mount Lemmon Survey	·	2.7 km	MPC · JPL
754759	2016 UL	—	October 17, 2016	WISE	WISE	·	3.3 km	MPC · JPL
754760	2016 UZ	—	August 29, 2005	Kitt Peak	Spacewatch	·	1.6 km	MPC · JPL
754761	2016 UB_{1}	—	October 27, 2009	Kitt Peak	Spacewatch	·	640 m	MPC · JPL
754762	2016 UE_{1}	—	September 16, 2012	Catalina	CSS	PHO	800 m	MPC · JPL
754763	2016 UG_{3}	—	July 30, 2016	Haleakala	Pan-STARRS 1	·	1.4 km	MPC · JPL
754764	2016 UC_{4}	—	August 10, 2016	Haleakala	Pan-STARRS 1	·	1.0 km	MPC · JPL
754765	2016 UH_{4}	—	November 17, 2006	Kitt Peak	Spacewatch	·	1.4 km	MPC · JPL
754766	2016 UC_{5}	—	October 23, 2008	Kitt Peak	Spacewatch	H	510 m	MPC · JPL
754767	2016 UF_{6}	—	November 19, 2008	Kitt Peak	Spacewatch	·	760 m	MPC · JPL
754768	2016 UB_{7}	—	December 11, 2013	Haleakala	Pan-STARRS 1	·	640 m	MPC · JPL
754769	2016 UJ_{7}	—	August 2, 2016	Haleakala	Pan-STARRS 1	·	1.1 km	MPC · JPL
754770	2016 UO_{7}	—	October 7, 2007	Catalina	CSS	·	1.4 km	MPC · JPL
754771	2016 UB_{8}	—	August 30, 2016	Mount Lemmon	Mount Lemmon Survey	·	690 m	MPC · JPL
754772	2016 UN_{8}	—	October 1, 2016	Mount Lemmon	Mount Lemmon Survey	·	660 m	MPC · JPL
754773	2016 UQ_{11}	—	October 24, 2009	Kitt Peak	Spacewatch	·	830 m	MPC · JPL
754774	2016 US_{14}	—	March 21, 2015	Haleakala	Pan-STARRS 1	H	460 m	MPC · JPL
754775	2016 UV_{14}	—	September 6, 2008	Mount Lemmon	Mount Lemmon Survey	·	670 m	MPC · JPL
754776	2016 UR_{16}	—	September 2, 2016	Mount Lemmon	Mount Lemmon Survey	·	1.4 km	MPC · JPL
754777	2016 UY_{18}	—	September 3, 2008	Kitt Peak	Spacewatch	·	800 m	MPC · JPL
754778	2016 UQ_{20}	—	November 3, 2011	Mount Lemmon	Mount Lemmon Survey	·	1.4 km	MPC · JPL
754779	2016 UZ_{21}	—	October 24, 2011	Haleakala	Pan-STARRS 1	EOS	1.1 km	MPC · JPL
754780	2016 UH_{23}	—	November 9, 2004	Mauna Kea	Veillet, C.	·	620 m	MPC · JPL
754781	2016 UX_{23}	—	March 27, 2015	Mount Lemmon	Mount Lemmon Survey	H	390 m	MPC · JPL
754782	2016 UZ_{23}	—	September 7, 2008	Mount Lemmon	Mount Lemmon Survey	·	900 m	MPC · JPL
754783	2016 UD_{24}	—	September 30, 2016	Haleakala	Pan-STARRS 1	KON	1.5 km	MPC · JPL
754784	2016 UU_{24}	—	December 22, 2008	Kitt Peak	Spacewatch	·	1.0 km	MPC · JPL
754785	2016 UT_{26}	—	November 19, 2012	Nogales	M. Schwartz, P. R. Holvorcem	HNS	1.5 km	MPC · JPL
754786	2016 UW_{26}	—	October 2, 2016	Mount Lemmon	Mount Lemmon Survey	·	1.0 km	MPC · JPL
754787	2016 UF_{28}	—	October 10, 2008	Mount Lemmon	Mount Lemmon Survey	·	960 m	MPC · JPL
754788	2016 UL_{29}	—	August 29, 2005	Kitt Peak	Spacewatch	NYS	870 m	MPC · JPL
754789	2016 UT_{29}	—	April 6, 2002	Cerro Tololo	Deep Ecliptic Survey	·	1.1 km	MPC · JPL
754790	2016 UF_{31}	—	November 18, 2011	Mount Lemmon	Mount Lemmon Survey	H	530 m	MPC · JPL
754791	2016 UA_{32}	—	October 23, 2016	Cerro Paranal	Altmann, M., Prusti, T.	EUN	590 m	MPC · JPL
754792	2016 UK_{32}	—	July 11, 2016	Mount Lemmon	Mount Lemmon Survey	(194)	1.4 km	MPC · JPL
754793	2016 UK_{33}	—	November 3, 2008	Kitt Peak	Spacewatch	·	600 m	MPC · JPL
754794	2016 UW_{33}	—	October 16, 2007	Mount Lemmon	Mount Lemmon Survey	MRX	880 m	MPC · JPL
754795	2016 UL_{35}	—	April 14, 2015	Mount Lemmon	Mount Lemmon Survey	·	870 m	MPC · JPL
754796	2016 UM_{35}	—	October 18, 2007	Kitt Peak	Spacewatch	·	1.3 km	MPC · JPL
754797	2016 UV_{36}	—	October 22, 2012	Haleakala	Pan-STARRS 1	KON	1.4 km	MPC · JPL
754798	2016 UP_{37}	—	October 17, 2012	Mount Lemmon	Mount Lemmon Survey	·	780 m	MPC · JPL
754799	2016 UJ_{38}	—	July 11, 2016	Mount Lemmon	Mount Lemmon Survey	·	1.0 km	MPC · JPL
754800	2016 UR_{38}	—	March 2, 2009	Mount Lemmon	Mount Lemmon Survey	·	1.4 km	MPC · JPL

== 754801–754900 ==
back to top

Designation			Discovery			Properties		Ref
Permanent	Provisional	Named after	Date	Site	Discoverer(s)	Category	Diam.	Ref
754801	2016 UV_{39}	—	June 6, 2002	Palomar	NEAT	·	1.5 km	MPC · JPL
754802	2016 UQ_{40}	—	July 17, 2016	Haleakala	Pan-STARRS 1	EUN	1.2 km	MPC · JPL
754803	2016 UO_{42}	—	February 3, 2013	Haleakala	Pan-STARRS 1	·	1.0 km	MPC · JPL
754804	2016 US_{42}	—	October 31, 2008	Catalina	CSS	H	550 m	MPC · JPL
754805	2016 UK_{43}	—	October 24, 2009	Kitt Peak	Spacewatch	·	680 m	MPC · JPL
754806	2016 UL_{43}	—	September 20, 2003	Anderson Mesa	LONEOS	·	580 m	MPC · JPL
754807	2016 UA_{44}	—	July 19, 2015	Haleakala	Pan-STARRS 1	·	3.1 km	MPC · JPL
754808	2016 UW_{44}	—	September 24, 2012	Nogales	M. Schwartz, P. R. Holvorcem	EUN	1.4 km	MPC · JPL
754809	2016 UD_{46}	—	October 18, 2012	Mount Lemmon	Mount Lemmon Survey	·	830 m	MPC · JPL
754810	2016 UL_{48}	—	April 10, 2005	Kitt Peak	Deep Ecliptic Survey	AEO	900 m	MPC · JPL
754811	2016 UC_{49}	—	October 15, 2012	Kitt Peak	Spacewatch	·	1.1 km	MPC · JPL
754812	2016 UQ_{50}	—	September 11, 2016	Mount Lemmon	Mount Lemmon Survey	·	2.1 km	MPC · JPL
754813	2016 UE_{54}	—	March 15, 2008	Kitt Peak	Spacewatch	·	1.0 km	MPC · JPL
754814	2016 UO_{56}	—	August 16, 2007	XuYi	PMO NEO Survey Program	·	1.3 km	MPC · JPL
754815	2016 UW_{56}	—	December 29, 2008	Mount Lemmon	Mount Lemmon Survey	·	820 m	MPC · JPL
754816	2016 UK_{57}	—	August 23, 2011	Haleakala	Pan-STARRS 1	·	3.8 km	MPC · JPL
754817	2016 UR_{57}	—	September 27, 2016	Haleakala	Pan-STARRS 1	H	370 m	MPC · JPL
754818	2016 UV_{59}	—	November 26, 2011	Mount Lemmon	Mount Lemmon Survey	·	2.1 km	MPC · JPL
754819	2016 UL_{60}	—	November 10, 2005	Mount Lemmon	Mount Lemmon Survey	NYS	1.1 km	MPC · JPL
754820	2016 UR_{60}	—	December 2, 2004	Catalina	CSS	·	1.0 km	MPC · JPL
754821	2016 UA_{61}	—	October 8, 2012	Haleakala	Pan-STARRS 1	·	790 m	MPC · JPL
754822	2016 UQ_{63}	—	February 26, 2014	Mount Lemmon	Mount Lemmon Survey	·	1.1 km	MPC · JPL
754823	2016 UB_{64}	—	March 12, 2013	Happy Jack	Wasserman, L. H.	·	2.8 km	MPC · JPL
754824	2016 UM_{67}	—	June 13, 2005	Mount Lemmon	Mount Lemmon Survey	·	800 m	MPC · JPL
754825	2016 US_{67}	—	March 6, 2006	Kitt Peak	Spacewatch	·	1.6 km	MPC · JPL
754826	2016 UR_{68}	—	October 25, 2012	Piszkés-tető	K. Sárneczky, T. Vorobjov	·	1.2 km	MPC · JPL
754827	2016 UV_{68}	—	March 16, 2015	Mount Lemmon	Mount Lemmon Survey	·	640 m	MPC · JPL
754828	2016 UA_{69}	—	October 19, 2003	Kitt Peak	Spacewatch	·	1.1 km	MPC · JPL
754829	2016 UF_{69}	—	October 26, 2016	Haleakala	Pan-STARRS 1	3:2	3.8 km	MPC · JPL
754830	2016 UJ_{69}	—	October 14, 2009	Mount Lemmon	Mount Lemmon Survey	·	630 m	MPC · JPL
754831	2016 UG_{70}	—	April 21, 2009	Mount Lemmon	Mount Lemmon Survey	·	540 m	MPC · JPL
754832	2016 UZ_{70}	—	December 5, 1999	Catalina	CSS	·	1.2 km	MPC · JPL
754833	2016 UH_{71}	—	September 29, 2008	Mount Lemmon	Mount Lemmon Survey	HNS	760 m	MPC · JPL
754834	2016 UB_{72}	—	January 22, 2004	Socorro	LINEAR	·	1.2 km	MPC · JPL
754835	2016 UR_{72}	—	August 29, 2005	Kitt Peak	Spacewatch	·	660 m	MPC · JPL
754836	2016 UH_{74}	—	September 30, 2016	Haleakala	Pan-STARRS 1	MAR	690 m	MPC · JPL
754837	2016 UJ_{74}	—	October 20, 2016	Mount Lemmon	Mount Lemmon Survey	·	900 m	MPC · JPL
754838	2016 UL_{74}	—	November 4, 2012	Mount Lemmon	Mount Lemmon Survey	·	520 m	MPC · JPL
754839	2016 UN_{75}	—	February 23, 2007	Mount Lemmon	Mount Lemmon Survey	·	540 m	MPC · JPL
754840	2016 UW_{75}	—	September 22, 2008	Kitt Peak	Spacewatch	3:2	3.6 km	MPC · JPL
754841	2016 UP_{76}	—	November 18, 1996	Kitt Peak	Spacewatch	·	790 m	MPC · JPL
754842	2016 UB_{77}	—	October 26, 2016	Kitt Peak	Spacewatch	·	1.3 km	MPC · JPL
754843	2016 UE_{77}	—	April 8, 2014	Haleakala	Pan-STARRS 1	HNS	990 m	MPC · JPL
754844	2016 US_{77}	—	November 10, 2009	Kitt Peak	Spacewatch	fast	790 m	MPC · JPL
754845	2016 UZ_{77}	—	September 27, 2002	Palomar	NEAT	·	500 m	MPC · JPL
754846	2016 UW_{79}	—	November 27, 2009	Kitt Peak	Spacewatch	·	810 m	MPC · JPL
754847	2016 UZ_{79}	—	April 4, 2014	Haleakala	Pan-STARRS 1	·	1.7 km	MPC · JPL
754848	2016 UE_{80}	—	August 29, 2016	Mount Lemmon	Mount Lemmon Survey	MAR	760 m	MPC · JPL
754849	2016 UG_{80}	—	December 5, 2008	Mount Lemmon	Mount Lemmon Survey	·	780 m	MPC · JPL
754850	2016 UZ_{81}	—	August 25, 2005	Palomar	NEAT	·	770 m	MPC · JPL
754851	2016 UE_{82}	—	September 10, 2007	Mount Lemmon	Mount Lemmon Survey	·	1.1 km	MPC · JPL
754852	2016 UL_{82}	—	October 10, 2016	Mount Lemmon	Mount Lemmon Survey	·	1.8 km	MPC · JPL
754853	2016 UF_{83}	—	October 26, 2016	Haleakala	Pan-STARRS 1	·	1.1 km	MPC · JPL
754854	2016 UJ_{83}	—	October 26, 2016	Haleakala	Pan-STARRS 1	·	770 m	MPC · JPL
754855	2016 UT_{83}	—	October 30, 2008	Kitt Peak	Spacewatch	MAR	820 m	MPC · JPL
754856	2016 UH_{85}	—	October 26, 2016	Haleakala	Pan-STARRS 1	·	580 m	MPC · JPL
754857	2016 UX_{86}	—	September 27, 2016	Mount Lemmon	Mount Lemmon Survey	EUN	810 m	MPC · JPL
754858	2016 UH_{87}	—	October 8, 2004	Kitt Peak	Spacewatch	·	530 m	MPC · JPL
754859	2016 UR_{87}	—	November 25, 2005	Mount Lemmon	Mount Lemmon Survey	·	1.9 km	MPC · JPL
754860	2016 US_{89}	—	April 6, 2014	Mount Lemmon	Mount Lemmon Survey	GAL	1.2 km	MPC · JPL
754861	2016 UN_{90}	—	October 9, 2008	Kitt Peak	Spacewatch	·	630 m	MPC · JPL
754862	2016 UB_{91}	—	September 21, 2011	Mount Lemmon	Mount Lemmon Survey	·	1.5 km	MPC · JPL
754863	2016 UG_{94}	—	December 2, 2008	Kitt Peak	Spacewatch	(5) · fast	710 m	MPC · JPL
754864	2016 UJ_{94}	—	October 21, 2016	Mount Lemmon	Mount Lemmon Survey	·	640 m	MPC · JPL
754865	2016 UW_{94}	—	April 23, 2015	Haleakala	Pan-STARRS 1	(5)	810 m	MPC · JPL
754866	2016 UK_{95}	—	October 24, 2005	Kitt Peak	Spacewatch	PHO	690 m	MPC · JPL
754867	2016 UC_{96}	—	September 21, 2009	Mount Lemmon	Mount Lemmon Survey	·	870 m	MPC · JPL
754868	2016 UD_{96}	—	September 30, 2016	Haleakala	Pan-STARRS 1	KOR	1.1 km	MPC · JPL
754869	2016 US_{96}	—	November 19, 2008	Mount Lemmon	Mount Lemmon Survey	·	750 m	MPC · JPL
754870	2016 UM_{97}	—	October 9, 2012	Mount Lemmon	Mount Lemmon Survey	KON	1.4 km	MPC · JPL
754871	2016 UO_{98}	—	February 14, 2013	Haleakala	Pan-STARRS 1	·	1.7 km	MPC · JPL
754872	2016 UW_{98}	—	September 30, 2016	Haleakala	Pan-STARRS 1	·	1.4 km	MPC · JPL
754873	2016 UP_{99}	—	June 4, 2011	Mount Lemmon	Mount Lemmon Survey	EUN	640 m	MPC · JPL
754874	2016 UD_{100}	—	October 27, 2016	Mount Lemmon	Mount Lemmon Survey	·	1.1 km	MPC · JPL
754875	2016 UH_{102}	—	October 19, 2016	Mount Lemmon	Mount Lemmon Survey	·	1.6 km	MPC · JPL
754876	2016 UA_{103}	—	May 21, 2015	Haleakala	Pan-STARRS 1	·	1 km	MPC · JPL
754877	2016 UL_{106}	—	October 18, 2012	Haleakala	Pan-STARRS 1	·	720 m	MPC · JPL
754878	2016 UA_{111}	—	November 17, 2007	Kitt Peak	Spacewatch	·	1.3 km	MPC · JPL
754879	2016 UF_{111}	—	January 15, 2007	Mauna Kea	P. A. Wiegert	·	1.2 km	MPC · JPL
754880	2016 UG_{115}	—	October 27, 2005	Kitt Peak	Spacewatch	·	2.0 km	MPC · JPL
754881	2016 UM_{115}	—	November 3, 2008	Kitt Peak	Spacewatch	·	760 m	MPC · JPL
754882	2016 UL_{116}	—	June 15, 2015	Haleakala	Pan-STARRS 1	·	1.1 km	MPC · JPL
754883	2016 UK_{120}	—	November 8, 2010	Mauna Kea	Forshay, P., M. Micheli	·	2.4 km	MPC · JPL
754884	2016 UL_{120}	—	October 21, 2012	Haleakala	Pan-STARRS 1	·	600 m	MPC · JPL
754885	2016 UZ_{120}	—	November 7, 2012	Mount Lemmon	Mount Lemmon Survey	(5)	670 m	MPC · JPL
754886	2016 UF_{122}	—	October 27, 2016	Mount Lemmon	Mount Lemmon Survey	·	1.4 km	MPC · JPL
754887	2016 UX_{122}	—	May 8, 2011	Mount Lemmon	Mount Lemmon Survey	·	710 m	MPC · JPL
754888	2016 UC_{123}	—	October 19, 2016	Mount Lemmon	Mount Lemmon Survey	·	1.5 km	MPC · JPL
754889	2016 UM_{128}	—	May 12, 2015	Mount Lemmon	Mount Lemmon Survey	·	700 m	MPC · JPL
754890	2016 UF_{134}	—	October 27, 2016	Haleakala	Pan-STARRS 1	·	970 m	MPC · JPL
754891	2016 UM_{139}	—	May 26, 2015	Mount Lemmon	Mount Lemmon Survey	·	1.1 km	MPC · JPL
754892	2016 UP_{139}	—	December 12, 2012	Mount Lemmon	Mount Lemmon Survey	·	1.2 km	MPC · JPL
754893	2016 UK_{146}	—	September 4, 2016	Mount Lemmon	Mount Lemmon Survey	MAR	820 m	MPC · JPL
754894	2016 UT_{146}	—	November 12, 2012	Catalina	CSS	·	1.2 km	MPC · JPL
754895	2016 UQ_{148}	—	May 24, 2011	Haleakala	Pan-STARRS 1	·	1.3 km	MPC · JPL
754896	2016 UR_{148}	—	October 25, 2003	Kitt Peak	Spacewatch	·	1.2 km	MPC · JPL
754897	2016 UB_{149}	—	November 15, 2012	Oukaïmeden	C. Rinner	·	1.7 km	MPC · JPL
754898	2016 UN_{150}	—	October 21, 2016	Mount Lemmon	Mount Lemmon Survey	·	960 m	MPC · JPL
754899	2016 UW_{150}	—	October 27, 2016	Haleakala	Pan-STARRS 1	PHO	880 m	MPC · JPL
754900	2016 US_{151}	—	October 25, 2016	Haleakala	Pan-STARRS 1	·	930 m	MPC · JPL

== 754901–755000 ==
back to top

Designation			Discovery			Properties		Ref
Permanent	Provisional	Named after	Date	Site	Discoverer(s)	Category	Diam.	Ref
754901	2016 UV_{153}	—	October 26, 2016	Kitt Peak	Spacewatch	·	940 m	MPC · JPL
754902	2016 UW_{153}	—	October 26, 2016	Haleakala	Pan-STARRS 1	·	1.4 km	MPC · JPL
754903	2016 UY_{153}	—	October 24, 2016	Mount Lemmon	Mount Lemmon Survey	·	960 m	MPC · JPL
754904	2016 UB_{173}	—	May 30, 2019	Haleakala	Pan-STARRS 1	·	1.2 km	MPC · JPL
754905	2016 UM_{178}	—	January 21, 2014	Mount Lemmon	Mount Lemmon Survey	NYS	660 m	MPC · JPL
754906	2016 UQ_{188}	—	January 13, 2018	Mount Lemmon	Mount Lemmon Survey	·	1.1 km	MPC · JPL
754907	2016 UX_{188}	—	April 4, 2014	Haleakala	Pan-STARRS 1	·	680 m	MPC · JPL
754908	2016 UE_{205}	—	December 26, 2011	Mount Lemmon	Mount Lemmon Survey	·	1.8 km	MPC · JPL
754909	2016 UM_{208}	—	January 28, 2007	Mount Lemmon	Mount Lemmon Survey	·	1.8 km	MPC · JPL
754910	2016 UN_{221}	—	April 11, 2010	Mount Lemmon	Mount Lemmon Survey	MIS	1.9 km	MPC · JPL
754911	2016 UY_{223}	—	August 19, 2001	Cerro Tololo	Deep Ecliptic Survey	KOR	940 m	MPC · JPL
754912	2016 UR_{225}	—	March 15, 2013	Mount Lemmon	Mount Lemmon Survey	·	1.6 km	MPC · JPL
754913	2016 UN_{245}	—	May 3, 2014	Mount Lemmon	Mount Lemmon Survey	KOR	1.0 km	MPC · JPL
754914	2016 UK_{246}	—	October 28, 2016	Haleakala	Pan-STARRS 1	·	1.3 km	MPC · JPL
754915	2016 UM_{246}	—	October 28, 2016	Haleakala	Pan-STARRS 1	MAR	690 m	MPC · JPL
754916	2016 UA_{249}	—	October 24, 2016	Mount Lemmon	Mount Lemmon Survey	·	1.0 km	MPC · JPL
754917	2016 UN_{251}	—	October 28, 2016	Haleakala	Pan-STARRS 1	AGN	810 m	MPC · JPL
754918	2016 UU_{251}	—	October 25, 2016	Haleakala	Pan-STARRS 1	·	1.2 km	MPC · JPL
754919	2016 UZ_{251}	—	October 25, 2016	Haleakala	Pan-STARRS 1	·	2.3 km	MPC · JPL
754920	2016 UN_{252}	—	October 24, 2016	Mount Lemmon	Mount Lemmon Survey	·	1.5 km	MPC · JPL
754921	2016 UP_{252}	—	September 14, 2007	Catalina	CSS	·	1.3 km	MPC · JPL
754922	2016 US_{252}	—	October 21, 2016	Mount Lemmon	Mount Lemmon Survey	·	920 m	MPC · JPL
754923	2016 UB_{254}	—	October 24, 2016	Mount Lemmon	Mount Lemmon Survey	·	980 m	MPC · JPL
754924	2016 UU_{254}	—	October 12, 2016	Mount Lemmon	Mount Lemmon Survey	·	1.1 km	MPC · JPL
754925	2016 UW_{254}	—	October 28, 2016	Haleakala	Pan-STARRS 1	·	880 m	MPC · JPL
754926	2016 UC_{255}	—	October 22, 2016	Mount Lemmon	Mount Lemmon Survey	·	1.2 km	MPC · JPL
754927	2016 UH_{255}	—	October 22, 2016	Mount Lemmon	Mount Lemmon Survey	·	1.4 km	MPC · JPL
754928	2016 UF_{256}	—	October 31, 2016	Mount Lemmon	Mount Lemmon Survey	·	1.6 km	MPC · JPL
754929	2016 UY_{256}	—	October 29, 2016	Mount Lemmon	Mount Lemmon Survey	·	1.8 km	MPC · JPL
754930	2016 UF_{258}	—	October 26, 2016	Mount Lemmon	Mount Lemmon Survey	·	880 m	MPC · JPL
754931	2016 UL_{258}	—	October 26, 2016	Haleakala	Pan-STARRS 1	·	930 m	MPC · JPL
754932	2016 UB_{259}	—	October 25, 2016	Haleakala	Pan-STARRS 1	·	1.3 km	MPC · JPL
754933	2016 UM_{259}	—	October 24, 2016	Mount Lemmon	Mount Lemmon Survey	(5)	1.0 km	MPC · JPL
754934	2016 UW_{259}	—	October 23, 2016	Mount Lemmon	Mount Lemmon Survey	·	1.0 km	MPC · JPL
754935	2016 UY_{259}	—	October 31, 2016	Haleakala	Pan-STARRS 1	·	1.2 km	MPC · JPL
754936	2016 UR_{260}	—	October 20, 2016	Mount Lemmon	Mount Lemmon Survey	·	800 m	MPC · JPL
754937	2016 UK_{266}	—	October 21, 2016	Mount Lemmon	Mount Lemmon Survey	·	1.2 km	MPC · JPL
754938	2016 UA_{281}	—	October 23, 2016	Mount Lemmon	Mount Lemmon Survey	EUN	950 m	MPC · JPL
754939	2016 UM_{281}	—	October 28, 2016	Haleakala	Pan-STARRS 1	MAR	830 m	MPC · JPL
754940	2016 VC_{2}	—	November 26, 2011	Kitt Peak	Spacewatch	H	500 m	MPC · JPL
754941	2016 VB_{6}	—	July 25, 2009	La Sagra	OAM	·	770 m	MPC · JPL
754942	2016 VC_{6}	—	March 29, 2004	Catalina	CSS	H	470 m	MPC · JPL
754943	2016 VH_{7}	—	September 19, 2006	Kitt Peak	Spacewatch	KOR	970 m	MPC · JPL
754944	2016 VV_{8}	—	November 14, 2007	Kitt Peak	Spacewatch	AGN	890 m	MPC · JPL
754945	2016 VA_{9}	—	April 28, 2006	Cerro Tololo	Deep Ecliptic Survey	(5)	730 m	MPC · JPL
754946	2016 VN_{9}	—	November 19, 2001	Socorro	LINEAR	·	920 m	MPC · JPL
754947	2016 VS_{9}	—	November 27, 2012	Mount Lemmon	Mount Lemmon Survey	(5)	990 m	MPC · JPL
754948	2016 VX_{9}	—	December 12, 2012	Mount Lemmon	Mount Lemmon Survey	·	1.1 km	MPC · JPL
754949	2016 VX_{10}	—	December 1, 2008	Mount Lemmon	Mount Lemmon Survey	(5)	980 m	MPC · JPL
754950	2016 VH_{11}	—	October 25, 2016	Haleakala	Pan-STARRS 1	·	910 m	MPC · JPL
754951	2016 VZ_{14}	—	October 23, 2006	Mount Lemmon	Mount Lemmon Survey	BAP	1.0 km	MPC · JPL
754952	2016 VG_{15}	—	December 1, 2008	Mount Lemmon	Mount Lemmon Survey	EUN	1.0 km	MPC · JPL
754953	2016 VO_{15}	—	October 10, 2016	Mount Lemmon	Mount Lemmon Survey	·	1.4 km	MPC · JPL
754954	2016 VG_{16}	—	November 27, 2012	Mount Lemmon	Mount Lemmon Survey	·	1.2 km	MPC · JPL
754955	2016 VJ_{16}	—	December 4, 2008	Mount Lemmon	Mount Lemmon Survey	(5)	930 m	MPC · JPL
754956	2016 VU_{16}	—	October 18, 2003	Kitt Peak	Spacewatch	H	410 m	MPC · JPL
754957	2016 VS_{17}	—	April 30, 2014	Haleakala	Pan-STARRS 1	·	1.5 km	MPC · JPL
754958	2016 VW_{18}	—	October 9, 2012	Mount Lemmon	Mount Lemmon Survey	(5)	1.0 km	MPC · JPL
754959	2016 VX_{18}	—	October 22, 2016	Mount Lemmon	Mount Lemmon Survey	·	920 m	MPC · JPL
754960	2016 VU_{19}	—	December 23, 2012	Haleakala	Pan-STARRS 1	·	1.3 km	MPC · JPL
754961	2016 VV_{19}	—	April 30, 2014	Haleakala	Pan-STARRS 1	·	1.5 km	MPC · JPL
754962	2016 VN_{20}	—	October 24, 2011	Haleakala	Pan-STARRS 1	·	1.7 km	MPC · JPL
754963	2016 VZ_{20}	—	October 10, 2015	Kitt Peak	Spacewatch	·	2.5 km	MPC · JPL
754964	2016 VK_{21}	—	September 20, 2014	Haleakala	Pan-STARRS 1	·	2.7 km	MPC · JPL
754965	2016 VQ_{21}	—	May 21, 2014	Haleakala	Pan-STARRS 1	HNS	1.1 km	MPC · JPL
754966	2016 VL_{22}	—	November 11, 2016	Mount Lemmon	Mount Lemmon Survey	EUN	1.0 km	MPC · JPL
754967	2016 VO_{22}	—	September 20, 1995	Kitt Peak	Spacewatch	·	1.3 km	MPC · JPL
754968	2016 VR_{22}	—	November 10, 2016	Haleakala	Pan-STARRS 1	·	1.3 km	MPC · JPL
754969	2016 VT_{22}	—	November 11, 2016	Mount Lemmon	Mount Lemmon Survey	·	960 m	MPC · JPL
754970	2016 VX_{28}	—	November 10, 2016	Haleakala	Pan-STARRS 1	·	1.7 km	MPC · JPL
754971	2016 VJ_{29}	—	November 10, 2016	Haleakala	Pan-STARRS 1	·	1.1 km	MPC · JPL
754972	2016 VG_{30}	—	November 7, 2016	Kitt Peak	Spacewatch	·	1.2 km	MPC · JPL
754973	2016 VN_{30}	—	October 30, 2016	Catalina	CSS	·	1.2 km	MPC · JPL
754974	2016 VO_{30}	—	November 1, 2016	Haleakala	Pan-STARRS 1	JUN	910 m	MPC · JPL
754975	2016 VW_{31}	—	November 11, 2016	Mount Lemmon	Mount Lemmon Survey	·	1.8 km	MPC · JPL
754976	2016 VX_{31}	—	November 11, 2016	Mount Lemmon	Mount Lemmon Survey	·	1.1 km	MPC · JPL
754977	2016 VA_{32}	—	November 6, 2016	Haleakala	Pan-STARRS 1	H	450 m	MPC · JPL
754978	2016 VD_{33}	—	November 8, 2016	Mount Lemmon	Mount Lemmon Survey	·	1.3 km	MPC · JPL
754979	2016 VJ_{33}	—	November 11, 2016	Mount Lemmon	Mount Lemmon Survey	·	1.2 km	MPC · JPL
754980	2016 VZ_{33}	—	November 10, 2016	Mount Lemmon	Mount Lemmon Survey	MAR	840 m	MPC · JPL
754981	2016 VM_{34}	—	November 7, 2016	Mount Lemmon	Mount Lemmon Survey	·	1.3 km	MPC · JPL
754982	2016 VY_{34}	—	November 11, 2016	Mount Lemmon	Mount Lemmon Survey	·	840 m	MPC · JPL
754983	2016 VY_{35}	—	November 4, 2016	Haleakala	Pan-STARRS 1	·	1.3 km	MPC · JPL
754984	2016 VD_{36}	—	November 11, 2016	Mount Lemmon	Mount Lemmon Survey	·	1.0 km	MPC · JPL
754985	2016 VW_{36}	—	October 24, 2016	Mount Lemmon	Mount Lemmon Survey	·	1.2 km	MPC · JPL
754986	2016 VX_{36}	—	November 6, 2016	Mount Lemmon	Mount Lemmon Survey	(5)	880 m	MPC · JPL
754987	2016 VJ_{38}	—	November 5, 2016	Haleakala	Pan-STARRS 1	·	1 km	MPC · JPL
754988	2016 VS_{40}	—	November 9, 2016	Mount Lemmon	Mount Lemmon Survey	·	1.2 km	MPC · JPL
754989	2016 VD_{41}	—	November 10, 2016	Haleakala	Pan-STARRS 1	·	1.2 km	MPC · JPL
754990	2016 VJ_{41}	—	November 11, 2016	Mount Lemmon	Mount Lemmon Survey	(5)	1.1 km	MPC · JPL
754991	2016 VO_{42}	—	November 11, 2016	Mount Lemmon	Mount Lemmon Survey	MAR	1.1 km	MPC · JPL
754992	2016 VL_{55}	—	November 7, 2016	Mount Lemmon	Mount Lemmon Survey	·	1.1 km	MPC · JPL
754993	2016 WD_{4}	—	November 5, 2012	Kitt Peak	Spacewatch	(5)	920 m	MPC · JPL
754994	2016 WW_{4}	—	December 3, 2012	Mount Lemmon	Mount Lemmon Survey	(5)	820 m	MPC · JPL
754995	2016 WH_{5}	—	April 24, 2014	Mount Lemmon	Mount Lemmon Survey	EUN	960 m	MPC · JPL
754996	2016 WS_{5}	—	November 23, 2009	Kitt Peak	Spacewatch	·	940 m	MPC · JPL
754997	2016 WC_{6}	—	October 23, 2016	Mount Lemmon	Mount Lemmon Survey	·	600 m	MPC · JPL
754998	2016 WD_{6}	—	November 27, 2012	Mount Lemmon	Mount Lemmon Survey	·	900 m	MPC · JPL
754999	2016 WR_{6}	—	April 16, 2015	Catalina	CSS	H	550 m	MPC · JPL
755000	2016 WW_{10}	—	October 17, 2012	Mount Lemmon	Mount Lemmon Survey	·	710 m	MPC · JPL

back to top

== Meaning of names ==
As minor planet discoveries are confirmed, they are given a permanent number by the IAU's Minor Planet Center (MPC), and the discoverers can then submit names for them, following the IAU's naming conventions. The list below concerns those minor planets in the specified number-range that have received names, and explains the meanings of those names.

Official naming citations of newly named small Solar System bodies are approved and published in a bulletin by IAU's Working Group for Small Bodies Nomenclature (WGSBN). Before May 2021, citations were published in MPC's Minor Planet Circulars for many decades. Recent citations can also be found on the JPL Small-Body Database (SBDB). Until his death in 2016, German astronomer Lutz D. Schmadel compiled these citations into the Dictionary of Minor Planet Names (DMP) and regularly updated the collection.

Based on Paul Herget's The Names of the Minor Planets, Schmadel also researched the unclear origin of numerous asteroids, most of which had been named prior to World War II. This article incorporates text from this source, which is in the public domain: SBDB New namings may only be added to this list below after official publication as the preannouncement of names is condemned. The WGSBN publishes a comprehensive guideline for the naming rules of non-cometary small Solar System bodies.

Named minor planet	Provisional	This minor planet was named for...	Ref · Catalog
754258 Anghel	2016 NW_{6}	Radu M. Anghel, physics teacher, amateur astronomer and former curator of the Planetarium and Observatory of Bacău, Romania.	IAU · 754258
