= List of minor planets: 844001–845000 =

The following is a partial list of minor planets, running from minor-planet number 844001 through 845000, inclusive. The primary data for this and other partial lists is based on JPL's "Small-Body Orbital Elements" and data available from the Minor Planet Center. Critical list information is also provided by the MPC, unless otherwise specified from Lowell Observatory. A detailed description of the table's columns and additional sources are given on the main page including a complete list of every page in this series, and a statistical break-up on the dynamical classification of minor planets.

Also see the summary list of all named bodies in numerical and alphabetical order, and the corresponding naming citations for the number range of this particular list. New namings may only be added to this list after official publication, as the preannouncement of names is condemned by the Working Group for Small Bodies Nomenclature of the International Astronomical Union.

Near-Earth obj.	MBA (inner)	MBA (outer)	Centaur
Mars-crosser	MBA (middle)	Jupiter trojan	Trans-Neptunian obj.
Unclassified

== 844001–844100 ==
Designation			Discovery			Properties		Ref
Permanent	Provisional	Named after	Date	Site	Discoverer(s)	Category	Diam.	Ref
844001	2016 QF_{63}	—	October 29, 2002	Sacramento Peak	SDSS	·	1.8 km	MPC · JPL
844002	2016 QO_{64}	—	October 19, 2012	Mount Lemmon	Mount Lemmon Survey	·	1.2 km	MPC · JPL
844003	2016 QM_{65}	—	August 3, 2016	Haleakala	Pan-STARRS 1	·	1.0 km	MPC · JPL
844004	2016 QP_{69}	—	October 22, 2012	Mount Lemmon	Mount Lemmon Survey	·	1.3 km	MPC · JPL
844005	2016 QS_{69}	—	January 20, 2015	Haleakala	Pan-STARRS 1	·	840 m	MPC · JPL
844006	2016 QY_{70}	—	March 1, 2008	Kitt Peak	Spacewatch	·	760 m	MPC · JPL
844007	2016 QK_{71}	—	August 29, 2016	Mount Lemmon	Mount Lemmon Survey	·	1.3 km	MPC · JPL
844008	2016 QX_{71}	—	July 11, 2016	Haleakala	Pan-STARRS 1	·	890 m	MPC · JPL
844009	2016 QM_{73}	—	October 21, 2011	Kitt Peak	Spacewatch	·	1.5 km	MPC · JPL
844010	2016 QU_{80}	—	August 26, 2016	Haleakala	Pan-STARRS 1	ADE	1.7 km	MPC · JPL
844011	2016 QZ_{82}	—	October 24, 2011	Haleakala	Pan-STARRS 1	·	2.4 km	MPC · JPL
844012	2016 QP_{84}	—	April 22, 2010	WISE	WISE	·	4.4 km	MPC · JPL
844013	2016 QS_{93}	—	September 23, 2011	Haleakala	Pan-STARRS 1	EOS	1.2 km	MPC · JPL
844014	2016 QW_{94}	—	August 12, 2007	XuYi	PMO NEO Survey Program	·	1.5 km	MPC · JPL
844015	2016 QE_{95}	—	August 27, 2016	Haleakala	Pan-STARRS 1	·	1.3 km	MPC · JPL
844016	2016 QW_{95}	—	August 29, 2016	Mount Lemmon	Mount Lemmon Survey	EUN	950 m	MPC · JPL
844017	2016 QX_{96}	—	August 26, 2016	Haleakala	Pan-STARRS 1	·	2.3 km	MPC · JPL
844018	2016 QQ_{98}	—	August 26, 2016	Mount Lemmon	Mount Lemmon Survey	·	1.4 km	MPC · JPL
844019	2016 QE_{101}	—	August 27, 2016	Haleakala	Pan-STARRS 1	·	1.4 km	MPC · JPL
844020	2016 QF_{102}	—	August 28, 2016	Mount Lemmon	Mount Lemmon Survey	·	1.5 km	MPC · JPL
844021	2016 QY_{102}	—	August 30, 2016	Haleakala	Pan-STARRS 1	·	1.6 km	MPC · JPL
844022	2016 QT_{104}	—	August 17, 2016	Haleakala	Pan-STARRS 1	·	2.7 km	MPC · JPL
844023	2016 QH_{110}	—	August 29, 2016	Mount Lemmon	Mount Lemmon Survey	EUN	850 m	MPC · JPL
844024	2016 QX_{110}	—	August 28, 2016	Mount Lemmon	Mount Lemmon Survey	·	1 km	MPC · JPL
844025	2016 QJ_{112}	—	August 28, 2016	Mount Lemmon	Mount Lemmon Survey	·	1.1 km	MPC · JPL
844026	2016 QN_{118}	—	August 26, 2016	Haleakala	Pan-STARRS 1	V	520 m	MPC · JPL
844027	2016 QG_{129}	—	August 30, 2016	Mount Lemmon	Mount Lemmon Survey	·	860 m	MPC · JPL
844028	2016 QM_{130}	—	August 30, 2016	Mount Lemmon	Mount Lemmon Survey	·	1.8 km	MPC · JPL
844029	2016 QY_{130}	—	August 27, 2016	Haleakala	Pan-STARRS 1	·	570 m	MPC · JPL
844030	2016 QO_{135}	—	August 27, 2016	Haleakala	Pan-STARRS 1	·	1.6 km	MPC · JPL
844031	2016 QB_{136}	—	August 30, 2016	Haleakala	Pan-STARRS 1	·	1.4 km	MPC · JPL
844032	2016 QA_{137}	—	August 30, 2016	Haleakala	Pan-STARRS 1	·	1.3 km	MPC · JPL
844033	2016 QJ_{139}	—	August 27, 2016	Haleakala	Pan-STARRS 1	·	890 m	MPC · JPL
844034	2016 QX_{139}	—	August 28, 2016	Mount Lemmon	Mount Lemmon Survey	DOR	1.4 km	MPC · JPL
844035	2016 QG_{140}	—	August 28, 2016	Mount Lemmon	Mount Lemmon Survey	·	1.3 km	MPC · JPL
844036	2016 QD_{141}	—	August 29, 2016	Mount Lemmon	Mount Lemmon Survey	·	690 m	MPC · JPL
844037	2016 QS_{157}	—	October 14, 2007	Catalina	CSS	·	1.5 km	MPC · JPL
844038	2016 QW_{157}	—	August 27, 2016	Haleakala	Pan-STARRS 1	·	1.5 km	MPC · JPL
844039	2016 RN	—	July 17, 2016	Haleakala	Pan-STARRS 1	·	1.0 km	MPC · JPL
844040	2016 RD_{6}	—	August 17, 2016	Haleakala	Pan-STARRS 1	·	1.6 km	MPC · JPL
844041	2016 RE_{9}	—	October 4, 2002	Sacramento Peak	SDSS	BRA	1.2 km	MPC · JPL
844042	2016 RL_{10}	—	August 29, 2016	Mount Lemmon	Mount Lemmon Survey	ADE	1.5 km	MPC · JPL
844043	2016 RM_{11}	—	May 16, 2010	WISE	WISE	·	3.5 km	MPC · JPL
844044	2016 RA_{13}	—	August 28, 2016	Mount Lemmon	Mount Lemmon Survey	·	810 m	MPC · JPL
844045	2016 RP_{13}	—	August 29, 2016	Mount Lemmon	Mount Lemmon Survey	·	1 km	MPC · JPL
844046	2016 RU_{14}	—	July 7, 2016	Mount Lemmon	Mount Lemmon Survey	·	2.1 km	MPC · JPL
844047	2016 RV_{14}	—	February 27, 2010	WISE	WISE	·	2.9 km	MPC · JPL
844048	2016 RF_{15}	—	July 9, 2016	Haleakala	Pan-STARRS 1	·	540 m	MPC · JPL
844049	2016 RT_{22}	—	September 11, 2007	Mount Lemmon	Mount Lemmon Survey	AGN	790 m	MPC · JPL
844050	2016 RC_{23}	—	August 24, 2007	Kitt Peak	Spacewatch	AEO	790 m	MPC · JPL
844051	2016 RL_{24}	—	September 26, 2000	Sacramento Peak	SDSS	·	1.1 km	MPC · JPL
844052	2016 RQ_{25}	—	August 27, 2016	Haleakala	Pan-STARRS 1	·	460 m	MPC · JPL
844053	2016 RR_{25}	—	September 7, 2016	Haleakala	Pan-STARRS 1	H	370 m	MPC · JPL
844054	2016 RJ_{26}	—	November 19, 2009	Mount Lemmon	Mount Lemmon Survey	·	890 m	MPC · JPL
844055	2016 RO_{28}	—	September 16, 2002	Palomar	NEAT	·	1.6 km	MPC · JPL
844056	2016 RW_{28}	—	October 7, 2012	Kitt Peak	Spacewatch	·	1.2 km	MPC · JPL
844057	2016 RB_{29}	—	October 25, 2001	Sacramento Peak	SDSS	·	1.4 km	MPC · JPL
844058	2016 RM_{38}	—	September 11, 2016	Mount Lemmon	Mount Lemmon Survey	·	1.9 km	MPC · JPL
844059	2016 RF_{43}	—	September 21, 2011	Catalina	CSS	·	1.8 km	MPC · JPL
844060	2016 RJ_{43}	—	May 13, 2010	WISE	WISE	·	2.8 km	MPC · JPL
844061	2016 RW_{43}	—	September 14, 2007	Mount Lemmon	Mount Lemmon Survey	·	1.4 km	MPC · JPL
844062	2016 RP_{45}	—	September 10, 2016	Mount Lemmon	Mount Lemmon Survey	·	1.4 km	MPC · JPL
844063	2016 RT_{45}	—	May 25, 2006	Mauna Kea	P. A. Wiegert	·	1.0 km	MPC · JPL
844064	2016 RN_{49}	—	July 28, 2011	Haleakala	Pan-STARRS 1	·	1.3 km	MPC · JPL
844065	2016 RN_{50}	—	September 9, 2016	Mount Lemmon	Mount Lemmon Survey	·	2.3 km	MPC · JPL
844066	2016 RR_{50}	—	September 10, 2016	Mount Lemmon	Mount Lemmon Survey	BRA	1.2 km	MPC · JPL
844067	2016 RZ_{50}	—	September 12, 2016	Haleakala	Pan-STARRS 1	BRA	860 m	MPC · JPL
844068	2016 RB_{51}	—	June 27, 2010	WISE	WISE	·	3.2 km	MPC · JPL
844069	2016 RP_{53}	—	September 6, 2016	Mount Lemmon	Mount Lemmon Survey	·	1.1 km	MPC · JPL
844070	2016 RF_{57}	—	September 5, 2016	Mount Lemmon	Mount Lemmon Survey	·	2.0 km	MPC · JPL
844071	2016 RV_{60}	—	September 12, 2016	Haleakala	Pan-STARRS 1	·	1.3 km	MPC · JPL
844072	2016 RD_{63}	—	August 10, 2016	Haleakala	Pan-STARRS 1	·	1.8 km	MPC · JPL
844073	2016 RU_{66}	—	September 2, 2016	Mount Lemmon	Mount Lemmon Survey	·	990 m	MPC · JPL
844074	2016 RV_{66}	—	September 3, 2016	Mount Lemmon	Mount Lemmon Survey	HNS	1.0 km	MPC · JPL
844075	2016 RE_{67}	—	September 10, 2016	Kitt Peak	Spacewatch	·	800 m	MPC · JPL
844076	2016 RH_{76}	—	September 6, 2016	Mount Lemmon	Mount Lemmon Survey	·	1.2 km	MPC · JPL
844077	2016 RP_{76}	—	September 8, 2016	Haleakala	Pan-STARRS 1	·	1.1 km	MPC · JPL
844078	2016 RS_{78}	—	September 6, 2016	Mount Lemmon	Mount Lemmon Survey	·	1.4 km	MPC · JPL
844079	2016 RO_{84}	—	September 6, 2016	Mount Lemmon	Mount Lemmon Survey	·	1.4 km	MPC · JPL
844080	2016 RW_{84}	—	September 10, 2016	Mount Lemmon	Mount Lemmon Survey	MRX	630 m	MPC · JPL
844081	2016 RC_{85}	—	September 10, 2016	Mount Lemmon	Mount Lemmon Survey	·	1.3 km	MPC · JPL
844082	2016 RJ_{85}	—	September 4, 2016	Mount Lemmon	Mount Lemmon Survey	·	1.3 km	MPC · JPL
844083	2016 RL_{85}	—	September 12, 2016	Mount Lemmon	Mount Lemmon Survey	·	1.3 km	MPC · JPL
844084	2016 RC_{87}	—	March 27, 2015	Haleakala	Pan-STARRS 1	·	1.4 km	MPC · JPL
844085	2016 RP_{88}	—	September 2, 2016	Mount Lemmon	Mount Lemmon Survey	EUP	2.7 km	MPC · JPL
844086	2016 RK_{89}	—	September 6, 2016	Mount Lemmon	Mount Lemmon Survey	·	1.4 km	MPC · JPL
844087	2016 RK_{90}	—	September 5, 2016	Mount Lemmon	Mount Lemmon Survey	·	1.2 km	MPC · JPL
844088	2016 RA_{92}	—	September 10, 2016	Mount Lemmon	Mount Lemmon Survey	·	1.5 km	MPC · JPL
844089	2016 RQ_{94}	—	September 6, 2016	Mount Lemmon	Mount Lemmon Survey	·	640 m	MPC · JPL
844090	2016 RD_{98}	—	September 6, 2016	Mount Lemmon	Mount Lemmon Survey	·	590 m	MPC · JPL
844091	2016 SD_{4}	—	August 30, 2016	Haleakala	Pan-STARRS 1	·	2.2 km	MPC · JPL
844092	2016 SU_{5}	—	September 10, 2016	Mount Lemmon	Mount Lemmon Survey	·	1.1 km	MPC · JPL
844093	2016 SW_{9}	—	October 9, 2007	Kitt Peak	Spacewatch	·	1.5 km	MPC · JPL
844094	2016 SN_{10}	—	October 26, 2008	Kitt Peak	Spacewatch	·	850 m	MPC · JPL
844095	2016 SC_{11}	—	October 8, 2007	Mount Lemmon	Mount Lemmon Survey	·	1.2 km	MPC · JPL
844096	2016 SM_{12}	—	September 16, 2009	Mount Lemmon	Mount Lemmon Survey	·	670 m	MPC · JPL
844097	2016 SO_{14}	—	March 20, 1999	Sacramento Peak	SDSS	KOR	1.3 km	MPC · JPL
844098	2016 SR_{16}	—	September 24, 2007	Kitt Peak	Spacewatch	·	1.3 km	MPC · JPL
844099	2016 SK_{18}	—	February 13, 2002	Sacramento Peak	SDSS	·	2.4 km	MPC · JPL
844100	2016 SD_{20}	—	August 2, 2016	Haleakala	Pan-STARRS 1	·	1.7 km	MPC · JPL

== 844101–844200 ==
back to top

Designation			Discovery			Properties		Ref
Permanent	Provisional	Named after	Date	Site	Discoverer(s)	Category	Diam.	Ref
844101	2016 SN_{20}	—	September 1, 2010	Mount Lemmon	Mount Lemmon Survey	·	1.8 km	MPC · JPL
844102	2016 SW_{21}	—	May 21, 2015	Haleakala	Pan-STARRS 1	·	1.6 km	MPC · JPL
844103	2016 SU_{24}	—	September 12, 2002	Palomar	NEAT	·	1.5 km	MPC · JPL
844104	2016 SX_{25}	—	September 11, 2016	Mount Lemmon	Mount Lemmon Survey	·	1.5 km	MPC · JPL
844105	2016 SD_{28}	—	May 21, 2015	Haleakala	Pan-STARRS 1	HOF	2.0 km	MPC · JPL
844106	2016 SK_{30}	—	May 24, 2015	Mount Lemmon	Mount Lemmon Survey	·	1.5 km	MPC · JPL
844107	2016 SV_{30}	—	September 25, 2016	Haleakala	Pan-STARRS 1	TIR	2.0 km	MPC · JPL
844108	2016 SN_{32}	—	January 10, 2013	Haleakala	Pan-STARRS 1	·	1.6 km	MPC · JPL
844109	2016 SH_{36}	—	December 3, 2012	Mount Lemmon	Mount Lemmon Survey	·	1.0 km	MPC · JPL
844110	2016 SC_{37}	—	October 27, 2009	Kitt Peak	Spacewatch	·	750 m	MPC · JPL
844111	2016 SS_{38}	—	November 7, 2012	Nogales	M. Schwartz, P. R. Holvorcem	·	760 m	MPC · JPL
844112	2016 SE_{39}	—	September 30, 2016	Haleakala	Pan-STARRS 1	AGN	870 m	MPC · JPL
844113	2016 SB_{40}	—	April 6, 2011	Mount Lemmon	Mount Lemmon Survey	·	860 m	MPC · JPL
844114	2016 SX_{40}	—	May 10, 2010	WISE	WISE	T_{j} (2.98)	4.4 km	MPC · JPL
844115	2016 SN_{42}	—	October 17, 2012	Haleakala	Pan-STARRS 1	·	870 m	MPC · JPL
844116	2016 SH_{43}	—	September 30, 2016	Haleakala	Pan-STARRS 1	·	1.6 km	MPC · JPL
844117	2016 SR_{43}	—	January 22, 2015	Haleakala	Pan-STARRS 1	·	530 m	MPC · JPL
844118	2016 SE_{47}	—	September 20, 2011	Haleakala	Pan-STARRS 1	·	1.3 km	MPC · JPL
844119	2016 ST_{47}	—	September 26, 2016	Haleakala	Pan-STARRS 1	·	1.5 km	MPC · JPL
844120	2016 SV_{47}	—	October 1, 2005	Mount Lemmon	Mount Lemmon Survey	THM	2.0 km	MPC · JPL
844121	2016 SQ_{50}	—	October 12, 1999	Kitt Peak	Spacewatch	·	1.2 km	MPC · JPL
844122	2016 SS_{52}	—	September 25, 2016	Haleakala	Pan-STARRS 1	·	1.5 km	MPC · JPL
844123	2016 SO_{53}	—	September 8, 2011	Kitt Peak	Spacewatch	KOR	1.1 km	MPC · JPL
844124	2016 SX_{53}	—	September 26, 2016	Haleakala	Pan-STARRS 1	KOR	960 m	MPC · JPL
844125	2016 SM_{67}	—	September 25, 2016	Haleakala	Pan-STARRS 1	·	1.1 km	MPC · JPL
844126	2016 SE_{69}	—	September 22, 2016	Mount Lemmon	Mount Lemmon Survey	·	1.2 km	MPC · JPL
844127	2016 SS_{72}	—	September 26, 2016	Haleakala	Pan-STARRS 1	·	530 m	MPC · JPL
844128	2016 SW_{73}	—	September 22, 2016	Mount Lemmon	Mount Lemmon Survey	(17392)	1.2 km	MPC · JPL
844129	2016 SN_{75}	—	September 27, 2016	Haleakala	Pan-STARRS 1	·	820 m	MPC · JPL
844130	2016 SY_{76}	—	September 25, 2016	Haleakala	Pan-STARRS 1	·	1.2 km	MPC · JPL
844131	2016 SX_{82}	—	September 26, 2016	Haleakala	Pan-STARRS 1	·	1.5 km	MPC · JPL
844132	2016 SO_{86}	—	September 27, 2016	Mount Lemmon	Mount Lemmon Survey	(5)	960 m	MPC · JPL
844133	2016 SB_{89}	—	September 25, 2016	Haleakala	Pan-STARRS 1	·	900 m	MPC · JPL
844134	2016 SR_{89}	—	September 27, 2016	Mount Lemmon	Mount Lemmon Survey	·	1.5 km	MPC · JPL
844135	2016 SU_{90}	—	September 30, 2016	Haleakala	Pan-STARRS 1	MAS	470 m	MPC · JPL
844136	2016 SZ_{90}	—	September 25, 2016	Haleakala	Pan-STARRS 1	EOS	1.4 km	MPC · JPL
844137	2016 SL_{91}	—	September 25, 2016	Haleakala	Pan-STARRS 1	·	690 m	MPC · JPL
844138	2016 SR_{91}	—	October 11, 2009	Mount Lemmon	Mount Lemmon Survey	·	610 m	MPC · JPL
844139	2016 SZ_{91}	—	September 25, 2016	Haleakala	Pan-STARRS 1	EUP	2.4 km	MPC · JPL
844140	2016 SC_{96}	—	September 22, 2009	Mount Lemmon	Mount Lemmon Survey	·	710 m	MPC · JPL
844141	2016 SF_{97}	—	September 30, 2016	Haleakala	Pan-STARRS 1	V	470 m	MPC · JPL
844142	2016 SE_{100}	—	September 26, 2016	Haleakala	Pan-STARRS 1	KOR	1.0 km	MPC · JPL
844143	2016 SM_{100}	—	September 30, 2016	Haleakala	Pan-STARRS 1	KOR	940 m	MPC · JPL
844144	2016 SM_{101}	—	September 30, 2016	Haleakala	Pan-STARRS 1	·	1.2 km	MPC · JPL
844145	2016 SW_{101}	—	September 30, 2016	Haleakala	Pan-STARRS 1	·	1.7 km	MPC · JPL
844146	2016 SK_{104}	—	March 18, 2010	Kitt Peak	Spacewatch	H	350 m	MPC · JPL
844147	2016 SS_{109}	—	September 26, 2016	Haleakala	Pan-STARRS 1	KOR	930 m	MPC · JPL
844148	2016 SW_{109}	—	September 26, 2016	Haleakala	Pan-STARRS 1	·	1.4 km	MPC · JPL
844149	2016 SE_{110}	—	September 30, 2016	Haleakala	Pan-STARRS 1	·	1.3 km	MPC · JPL
844150	2016 SS_{110}	—	September 25, 2016	Mount Lemmon	Mount Lemmon Survey	·	1.5 km	MPC · JPL
844151	2016 SK_{115}	—	February 24, 2015	Haleakala	Pan-STARRS 1	·	760 m	MPC · JPL
844152	2016 SA_{116}	—	September 30, 2016	Haleakala	Pan-STARRS 1	·	1.5 km	MPC · JPL
844153	2016 SE_{116}	—	September 25, 2016	Mount Lemmon	Mount Lemmon Survey	KOR	1.1 km	MPC · JPL
844154	2016 TM_{1}	—	April 18, 2015	Haleakala	Pan-STARRS 1	·	1.8 km	MPC · JPL
844155	2016 TC_{2}	—	June 7, 2013	Haleakala	Pan-STARRS 1	H	360 m	MPC · JPL
844156	2016 TT_{3}	—	May 16, 2010	WISE	WISE	·	3.3 km	MPC · JPL
844157	2016 TS_{4}	—	March 21, 2001	Kitt Peak	SKADS	·	1.3 km	MPC · JPL
844158	2016 TF_{5}	—	August 28, 2016	Mount Lemmon	Mount Lemmon Survey	·	1.3 km	MPC · JPL
844159	2016 TQ_{6}	—	September 19, 2012	Mount Lemmon	Mount Lemmon Survey	·	1.1 km	MPC · JPL
844160	2016 TR_{7}	—	September 2, 2016	XuYi	PMO NEO Survey Program	·	1.8 km	MPC · JPL
844161	2016 TK_{15}	—	September 16, 2003	Kitt Peak	Spacewatch	·	520 m	MPC · JPL
844162	2016 TD_{16}	—	February 7, 2015	Mount Lemmon	Mount Lemmon Survey	H	380 m	MPC · JPL
844163	2016 TS_{18}	—	December 13, 2006	Mount Lemmon	Mount Lemmon Survey	H	430 m	MPC · JPL
844164	2016 TC_{19}	—	March 22, 2015	Haleakala	Pan-STARRS 1	H	300 m	MPC · JPL
844165	2016 TF_{21}	—	September 30, 2005	Anderson Mesa	LONEOS	·	2.8 km	MPC · JPL
844166	2016 TG_{24}	—	March 23, 2015	Kitt Peak	Spacewatch	·	510 m	MPC · JPL
844167	2016 TY_{25}	—	September 21, 2016	Haleakala	Pan-STARRS 1	·	660 m	MPC · JPL
844168	2016 TU_{29}	—	November 3, 2007	Mount Bigelow	CSS	·	1.7 km	MPC · JPL
844169	2016 TK_{30}	—	July 8, 2010	WISE	WISE	T_{j} (2.99)	3.0 km	MPC · JPL
844170	2016 TF_{33}	—	October 1, 2016	Mount Lemmon	Mount Lemmon Survey	·	1.9 km	MPC · JPL
844171	2016 TN_{39}	—	June 18, 2010	WISE	WISE	·	3.6 km	MPC · JPL
844172	2016 TS_{41}	—	August 2, 2016	Haleakala	Pan-STARRS 1	·	1.4 km	MPC · JPL
844173	2016 TA_{44}	—	September 20, 2011	Mount Lemmon	Mount Lemmon Survey	·	1.4 km	MPC · JPL
844174	2016 TS_{44}	—	September 12, 2016	Haleakala	Pan-STARRS 1	·	2.0 km	MPC · JPL
844175	2016 TY_{44}	—	September 5, 2016	Mount Lemmon	Mount Lemmon Survey	·	1.7 km	MPC · JPL
844176	2016 TG_{45}	—	August 20, 2003	Palomar	NEAT	·	1.7 km	MPC · JPL
844177	2016 TD_{49}	—	October 7, 2016	Haleakala	Pan-STARRS 1	·	1.9 km	MPC · JPL
844178	2016 TD_{50}	—	September 21, 2012	Catalina	CSS	·	870 m	MPC · JPL
844179	2016 TE_{50}	—	May 15, 2015	Haleakala	Pan-STARRS 1	·	550 m	MPC · JPL
844180	2016 TM_{52}	—	May 30, 2010	WISE	WISE	·	3.1 km	MPC · JPL
844181	2016 TY_{52}	—	October 1, 2016	Mount Lemmon	Mount Lemmon Survey	·	1.0 km	MPC · JPL
844182	2016 TY_{54}	—	October 23, 2011	Haleakala	Pan-STARRS 1	H	370 m	MPC · JPL
844183	2016 TW_{57}	—	September 25, 2016	Mount Lemmon	Mount Lemmon Survey	H	390 m	MPC · JPL
844184	2016 TX_{59}	—	October 6, 2016	Haleakala	Pan-STARRS 1	H	360 m	MPC · JPL
844185	2016 TA_{60}	—	June 13, 2015	Haleakala	Pan-STARRS 1	AGN	1.1 km	MPC · JPL
844186	2016 TF_{65}	—	October 7, 2016	Haleakala	Pan-STARRS 1	THB	2.2 km	MPC · JPL
844187	2016 TU_{72}	—	November 28, 2013	Mount Lemmon	Mount Lemmon Survey	·	510 m	MPC · JPL
844188	2016 TX_{74}	—	September 30, 2005	Catalina	CSS	·	3.2 km	MPC · JPL
844189	2016 TE_{77}	—	June 14, 2010	WISE	WISE	·	2.9 km	MPC · JPL
844190	2016 TG_{77}	—	July 14, 2010	WISE	WISE	T_{j} (2.98) · EUP	3.5 km	MPC · JPL
844191	2016 TD_{80}	—	September 20, 2003	Kitt Peak	Spacewatch	·	590 m	MPC · JPL
844192	2016 TG_{80}	—	December 23, 2012	Haleakala	Pan-STARRS 1	·	1.3 km	MPC · JPL
844193	2016 TM_{84}	—	October 5, 2016	Mount Lemmon	Mount Lemmon Survey	·	2.1 km	MPC · JPL
844194	2016 TU_{87}	—	February 28, 2010	WISE	WISE	PHO	620 m	MPC · JPL
844195	2016 TC_{88}	—	June 15, 2010	WISE	WISE	T_{j} (2.97)	3.3 km	MPC · JPL
844196	2016 TK_{89}	—	May 25, 2010	WISE	WISE	·	2.5 km	MPC · JPL
844197	2016 TN_{92}	—	November 26, 2012	Mount Lemmon	Mount Lemmon Survey	·	1.3 km	MPC · JPL
844198	2016 TO_{92}	—	February 9, 2007	Catalina	CSS	H	310 m	MPC · JPL
844199	2016 TX_{92}	—	July 11, 2016	Mount Lemmon	Mount Lemmon Survey	·	1.4 km	MPC · JPL
844200	2016 TK_{93}	—	August 26, 2012	Westfield	International Astronomical Search Collaboration	·	1.0 km	MPC · JPL

== 844201–844300 ==
back to top

Designation			Discovery			Properties		Ref
Permanent	Provisional	Named after	Date	Site	Discoverer(s)	Category	Diam.	Ref
844201	2016 TT_{95}	—	May 16, 2010	WISE	WISE	·	2.8 km	MPC · JPL
844202	2016 TU_{98}	—	January 10, 2013	Haleakala	Pan-STARRS 1	·	1.4 km	MPC · JPL
844203	2016 TS_{100}	—	October 12, 2016	Mount Lemmon	Mount Lemmon Survey	HNS	800 m	MPC · JPL
844204	2016 TX_{100}	—	October 4, 2016	Mount Lemmon	Mount Lemmon Survey	HNS	870 m	MPC · JPL
844205	2016 TC_{101}	—	June 26, 2010	WISE	WISE	·	2.7 km	MPC · JPL
844206	2016 TC_{102}	—	June 27, 2010	WISE	WISE	·	2.8 km	MPC · JPL
844207	2016 TV_{102}	—	August 5, 2010	WISE	WISE	·	2.7 km	MPC · JPL
844208	2016 TJ_{104}	—	September 20, 2006	Anderson Mesa	LONEOS	·	450 m	MPC · JPL
844209	2016 TL_{105}	—	October 12, 2016	Mount Lemmon	Mount Lemmon Survey	JUN	650 m	MPC · JPL
844210	2016 TS_{110}	—	October 9, 2016	Mount Lemmon	Mount Lemmon Survey	·	2.2 km	MPC · JPL
844211	2016 TZ_{112}	—	October 13, 2016	Mount Lemmon	Mount Lemmon Survey	H	360 m	MPC · JPL
844212	2016 TO_{114}	—	January 26, 2001	Sacramento Peak	SDSS	·	1.8 km	MPC · JPL
844213	2016 TZ_{114}	—	September 28, 2003	Desert Eagle	W. K. Y. Yeung	JUN	610 m	MPC · JPL
844214	2016 TP_{117}	—	May 22, 2010	WISE	WISE	·	2.5 km	MPC · JPL
844215	2016 TJ_{119}	—	October 8, 2016	Haleakala	Pan-STARRS 1	·	2.0 km	MPC · JPL
844216	2016 TP_{121}	—	October 7, 2016	Mount Lemmon	Mount Lemmon Survey	H	320 m	MPC · JPL
844217	2016 TN_{123}	—	October 6, 2016	Mount Lemmon	Mount Lemmon Survey	·	1.8 km	MPC · JPL
844218	2016 TS_{123}	—	October 2, 2016	Mount Lemmon	Mount Lemmon Survey	·	1.0 km	MPC · JPL
844219	2016 TC_{124}	—	October 6, 2016	Mount Lemmon	Mount Lemmon Survey	·	1.6 km	MPC · JPL
844220	2016 TW_{127}	—	November 13, 2007	Kitt Peak	Spacewatch	DOR	1.6 km	MPC · JPL
844221	2016 TN_{128}	—	October 7, 2016	Haleakala	Pan-STARRS 1	·	1.3 km	MPC · JPL
844222	2016 TR_{129}	—	October 6, 2016	Mount Lemmon	Mount Lemmon Survey	·	930 m	MPC · JPL
844223	2016 TB_{132}	—	October 8, 2016	Mount Lemmon	Mount Lemmon Survey	·	1.3 km	MPC · JPL
844224	2016 TG_{132}	—	October 10, 2016	Mount Lemmon	Mount Lemmon Survey	·	1.2 km	MPC · JPL
844225	2016 TT_{133}	—	October 12, 2016	Haleakala	Pan-STARRS 1	·	1.4 km	MPC · JPL
844226	2016 TL_{140}	—	October 2, 2016	Kitt Peak	Spacewatch	EUN	690 m	MPC · JPL
844227	2016 TQ_{146}	—	October 7, 2016	Mount Lemmon	Mount Lemmon Survey	·	920 m	MPC · JPL
844228	2016 TB_{147}	—	October 4, 2016	Mount Lemmon	Mount Lemmon Survey	·	710 m	MPC · JPL
844229	2016 TT_{147}	—	October 9, 2016	Haleakala	Pan-STARRS 1	EUN	740 m	MPC · JPL
844230	2016 TE_{148}	—	October 10, 2016	Mount Lemmon	Mount Lemmon Survey	·	1.1 km	MPC · JPL
844231	2016 TD_{151}	—	October 9, 2016	Haleakala	Pan-STARRS 1	·	1.0 km	MPC · JPL
844232	2016 TH_{152}	—	October 8, 2016	Haleakala	Pan-STARRS 1	EOS	1.3 km	MPC · JPL
844233	2016 TM_{152}	—	October 13, 2016	Mount Lemmon	Mount Lemmon Survey	·	970 m	MPC · JPL
844234	2016 TU_{152}	—	October 9, 2016	Haleakala	Pan-STARRS 1	EUN	830 m	MPC · JPL
844235	2016 TK_{153}	—	October 12, 2016	Haleakala	Pan-STARRS 1	·	900 m	MPC · JPL
844236	2016 TK_{157}	—	October 8, 2016	Haleakala	Pan-STARRS 1	V	420 m	MPC · JPL
844237	2016 TB_{160}	—	October 9, 2016	Mount Lemmon	Mount Lemmon Survey	·	1.3 km	MPC · JPL
844238	2016 TO_{167}	—	October 7, 2016	Kitt Peak	Spacewatch	·	1.4 km	MPC · JPL
844239	2016 TO_{169}	—	October 9, 2016	Haleakala	Pan-STARRS 1	·	1.6 km	MPC · JPL
844240	2016 TW_{173}	—	October 1, 2016	Mount Lemmon	Mount Lemmon Survey	·	1.6 km	MPC · JPL
844241	2016 TA_{175}	—	October 10, 2016	Mount Lemmon	Mount Lemmon Survey	·	1.8 km	MPC · JPL
844242	2016 TQ_{175}	—	October 19, 2003	Kitt Peak	Spacewatch	H	330 m	MPC · JPL
844243	2016 TH_{176}	—	October 8, 2016	Haleakala	Pan-STARRS 1	·	2.1 km	MPC · JPL
844244	2016 TD_{183}	—	October 12, 2016	Haleakala	Pan-STARRS 1	KOR	1.0 km	MPC · JPL
844245	2016 TW_{184}	—	October 12, 2016	Mount Lemmon	Mount Lemmon Survey	·	2.3 km	MPC · JPL
844246	2016 TX_{184}	—	October 10, 2016	Mount Lemmon	Mount Lemmon Survey	·	1.9 km	MPC · JPL
844247	2016 TC_{188}	—	October 9, 2016	Haleakala	Pan-STARRS 1	BRA	950 m	MPC · JPL
844248	2016 TU_{193}	—	October 2, 2016	Mount Lemmon	Mount Lemmon Survey	·	2.4 km	MPC · JPL
844249	2016 TW_{193}	—	October 7, 2016	Kitt Peak	Spacewatch	·	730 m	MPC · JPL
844250	2016 TQ_{196}	—	September 18, 2011	Mount Lemmon	Mount Lemmon Survey	·	1.3 km	MPC · JPL
844251	2016 TH_{202}	—	October 12, 2016	Haleakala	Pan-STARRS 1	·	950 m	MPC · JPL
844252	2016 TA_{209}	—	April 27, 2020	Haleakala	Pan-STARRS 1	·	1.9 km	MPC · JPL
844253	2016 UO_{3}	—	December 16, 2007	Kitt Peak	Spacewatch	·	1.2 km	MPC · JPL
844254	2016 UY_{3}	—	August 10, 2016	Haleakala	Pan-STARRS 1	·	460 m	MPC · JPL
844255	2016 UB_{4}	—	August 30, 2011	Haleakala	Pan-STARRS 1	·	1.4 km	MPC · JPL
844256	2016 UP_{4}	—	August 27, 2013	Haleakala	Pan-STARRS 1	H	510 m	MPC · JPL
844257	2016 UD_{5}	—	May 8, 2010	Mount Lemmon	Mount Lemmon Survey	H	340 m	MPC · JPL
844258	2016 UV_{6}	—	September 29, 2005	Kitt Peak	Spacewatch	EOS	1.3 km	MPC · JPL
844259	2016 UD_{7}	—	January 10, 2013	Haleakala	Pan-STARRS 1	·	1.1 km	MPC · JPL
844260	2016 UQ_{7}	—	September 30, 2016	Haleakala	Pan-STARRS 1	·	620 m	MPC · JPL
844261	2016 UL_{8}	—	May 16, 2010	WISE	WISE	·	3.0 km	MPC · JPL
844262	2016 UV_{10}	—	May 15, 2010	WISE	WISE	·	2.3 km	MPC · JPL
844263	2016 UF_{12}	—	August 10, 2016	Haleakala	Pan-STARRS 1	·	1.1 km	MPC · JPL
844264	2016 UX_{13}	—	September 21, 2011	Mount Lemmon	Mount Lemmon Survey	·	1.3 km	MPC · JPL
844265	2016 UT_{18}	—	February 25, 2011	Mount Lemmon	Mount Lemmon Survey	V	440 m	MPC · JPL
844266	2016 UA_{20}	—	December 15, 2007	Kitt Peak	Spacewatch	·	1.6 km	MPC · JPL
844267	2016 US_{21}	—	December 20, 2001	Sacramento Peak	SDSS	·	1.3 km	MPC · JPL
844268	2016 UY_{21}	—	February 6, 2014	Mount Lemmon	Mount Lemmon Survey	·	390 m	MPC · JPL
844269	2016 UA_{24}	—	May 21, 2015	Haleakala	Pan-STARRS 1	·	1.4 km	MPC · JPL
844270	2016 UB_{25}	—	August 30, 2005	Kitt Peak	Spacewatch	·	1.6 km	MPC · JPL
844271	2016 UR_{27}	—	March 27, 2008	Mount Lemmon	Mount Lemmon Survey	·	1.8 km	MPC · JPL
844272	2016 UN_{29}	—	May 18, 2015	Haleakala	Pan-STARRS 1	EUN	1.2 km	MPC · JPL
844273	2016 UJ_{33}	—	August 14, 2012	Haleakala	Pan-STARRS 1	NYS	800 m	MPC · JPL
844274	2016 UY_{33}	—	June 15, 2010	WISE	WISE	·	2.8 km	MPC · JPL
844275	2016 UX_{34}	—	September 23, 2001	Kitt Peak	Spacewatch	·	750 m	MPC · JPL
844276	2016 UH_{36}	—	March 17, 2013	Mount Lemmon	Mount Lemmon Survey	·	380 m	MPC · JPL
844277	2016 UM_{40}	—	October 25, 2016	Haleakala	Pan-STARRS 1	V	460 m	MPC · JPL
844278	2016 UN_{44}	—	October 25, 2016	Haleakala	Pan-STARRS 1	·	1.5 km	MPC · JPL
844279	2016 UY_{44}	—	October 8, 2016	Mount Lemmon	Mount Lemmon Survey	EOS	1.4 km	MPC · JPL
844280	2016 US_{45}	—	September 20, 2011	Haleakala	Pan-STARRS 1	·	1.6 km	MPC · JPL
844281	2016 UD_{48}	—	October 9, 2016	Mount Lemmon	Mount Lemmon Survey	·	1.2 km	MPC · JPL
844282	2016 UZ_{48}	—	October 2, 2016	Mount Lemmon	Mount Lemmon Survey	·	600 m	MPC · JPL
844283	2016 UZ_{52}	—	August 29, 2006	Kitt Peak	Spacewatch	·	450 m	MPC · JPL
844284	2016 UJ_{54}	—	November 10, 2009	Kitt Peak	Spacewatch	·	770 m	MPC · JPL
844285	2016 UD_{59}	—	September 10, 2016	Mount Lemmon	Mount Lemmon Survey	·	710 m	MPC · JPL
844286	2016 UE_{60}	—	October 10, 2016	Mount Lemmon	Mount Lemmon Survey	·	2.2 km	MPC · JPL
844287	2016 UK_{60}	—	December 26, 2005	Kitt Peak	Spacewatch	·	910 m	MPC · JPL
844288	2016 UA_{62}	—	August 2, 2016	Haleakala	Pan-STARRS 1	·	1.7 km	MPC · JPL
844289	2016 UH_{62}	—	May 24, 2010	WISE	WISE	·	2.7 km	MPC · JPL
844290	2016 UM_{62}	—	September 26, 2016	Haleakala	Pan-STARRS 1	·	1.4 km	MPC · JPL
844291	2016 UZ_{62}	—	May 12, 2010	WISE	WISE	T_{j} (2.99) · EUP	2.7 km	MPC · JPL
844292	2016 UW_{63}	—	October 21, 2012	Haleakala	Pan-STARRS 1	MAR	730 m	MPC · JPL
844293	2016 UH_{64}	—	October 21, 2012	Mount Lemmon	Mount Lemmon Survey	·	900 m	MPC · JPL
844294	2016 UK_{67}	—	November 12, 2012	Haleakala	Pan-STARRS 1	·	940 m	MPC · JPL
844295	2016 US_{68}	—	January 25, 2007	Kitt Peak	Spacewatch	·	1.9 km	MPC · JPL
844296	2016 UZ_{69}	—	October 26, 2016	Haleakala	Pan-STARRS 1	EOS	1.3 km	MPC · JPL
844297	2016 UD_{71}	—	September 21, 2011	Mount Lemmon	Mount Lemmon Survey	·	1.5 km	MPC · JPL
844298	2016 UU_{76}	—	October 26, 2016	Mount Lemmon	Mount Lemmon Survey	(13314)	1.5 km	MPC · JPL
844299	2016 UR_{77}	—	October 29, 2005	Kitt Peak	Spacewatch	MAS	470 m	MPC · JPL
844300	2016 US_{80}	—	May 5, 2010	WISE	WISE	·	2.2 km	MPC · JPL

== 844301–844400 ==
back to top

Designation			Discovery			Properties		Ref
Permanent	Provisional	Named after	Date	Site	Discoverer(s)	Category	Diam.	Ref
844301	2016 UT_{86}	—	September 2, 2016	Mount Lemmon	Mount Lemmon Survey	·	700 m	MPC · JPL
844302	2016 UN_{91}	—	November 9, 2007	Kitt Peak	Spacewatch	·	1.5 km	MPC · JPL
844303	2016 UQ_{94}	—	October 21, 2016	Mount Lemmon	Mount Lemmon Survey	·	1.3 km	MPC · JPL
844304	2016 UT_{95}	—	October 26, 2016	Haleakala	Pan-STARRS 1	·	1.2 km	MPC · JPL
844305	2016 UB_{100}	—	October 19, 1995	Kitt Peak	Spacewatch	(5)	790 m	MPC · JPL
844306	2016 UG_{102}	—	May 15, 2010	WISE	WISE	THM	2.2 km	MPC · JPL
844307	2016 UP_{103}	—	September 30, 2016	Haleakala	Pan-STARRS 1	·	1.2 km	MPC · JPL
844308	2016 UH_{105}	—	October 26, 2016	Haleakala	Pan-STARRS 1	·	1.5 km	MPC · JPL
844309	2016 UT_{106}	—	September 27, 2016	Haleakala	Pan-STARRS 1	·	1.5 km	MPC · JPL
844310	2016 UG_{108}	—	October 20, 2016	Mount Lemmon	Mount Lemmon Survey	·	580 m	MPC · JPL
844311	2016 US_{108}	—	July 16, 2004	Cerro Tololo	Deep Ecliptic Survey	·	700 m	MPC · JPL
844312	2016 UF_{110}	—	October 27, 2006	Mount Lemmon	Mount Lemmon Survey	KOR	880 m	MPC · JPL
844313	2016 UO_{111}	—	October 26, 2016	Haleakala	Pan-STARRS 1	·	1.1 km	MPC · JPL
844314	2016 UB_{112}	—	April 23, 2015	Haleakala	Pan-STARRS 1	·	1.4 km	MPC · JPL
844315	2016 UN_{112}	—	October 19, 2016	Mount Lemmon	Mount Lemmon Survey	·	470 m	MPC · JPL
844316	2016 UZ_{115}	—	March 31, 2008	Mount Lemmon	Mount Lemmon Survey	·	1.8 km	MPC · JPL
844317	2016 UV_{119}	—	February 23, 2007	Kitt Peak	Spacewatch	·	580 m	MPC · JPL
844318	2016 UR_{122}	—	July 9, 2015	Haleakala	Pan-STARRS 1	·	1.1 km	MPC · JPL
844319	2016 UP_{124}	—	July 10, 2010	WISE	WISE	·	2.3 km	MPC · JPL
844320	2016 UV_{124}	—	September 18, 2011	Mount Lemmon	Mount Lemmon Survey	AGN	980 m	MPC · JPL
844321	2016 UL_{130}	—	July 20, 2010	WISE	WISE	T_{j} (2.98) · EUP	2.6 km	MPC · JPL
844322	2016 UV_{132}	—	May 11, 2015	Mount Lemmon	Mount Lemmon Survey	·	630 m	MPC · JPL
844323	2016 UE_{135}	—	September 27, 2016	Haleakala	Pan-STARRS 1	·	490 m	MPC · JPL
844324	2016 UC_{136}	—	October 27, 2016	Haleakala	Pan-STARRS 1	·	750 m	MPC · JPL
844325	2016 US_{136}	—	May 4, 2009	Mount Lemmon	Mount Lemmon Survey	T_{j} (2.98) · EUP	2.7 km	MPC · JPL
844326	2016 UC_{138}	—	September 6, 2016	Mount Lemmon	Mount Lemmon Survey	·	1.5 km	MPC · JPL
844327	2016 US_{140}	—	October 26, 2016	Haleakala	Pan-STARRS 1	·	830 m	MPC · JPL
844328	2016 UT_{140}	—	November 25, 2011	Haleakala	Pan-STARRS 1	·	1.7 km	MPC · JPL
844329	2016 UX_{143}	—	August 2, 2016	Haleakala	Pan-STARRS 1	·	1.4 km	MPC · JPL
844330	2016 UA_{151}	—	October 20, 2016	Mount Lemmon	Mount Lemmon Survey	·	1.5 km	MPC · JPL
844331	2016 UD_{152}	—	October 26, 2016	Mount Lemmon	Mount Lemmon Survey	·	720 m	MPC · JPL
844332	2016 UM_{152}	—	October 26, 2016	Haleakala	Pan-STARRS 1	·	640 m	MPC · JPL
844333	2016 UJ_{154}	—	October 25, 2016	Haleakala	Pan-STARRS 1	·	1.1 km	MPC · JPL
844334	2016 UP_{155}	—	October 25, 2016	Haleakala	Pan-STARRS 1	·	1.1 km	MPC · JPL
844335	2016 UP_{181}	—	April 5, 2008	Mount Lemmon	Mount Lemmon Survey	·	1.6 km	MPC · JPL
844336	2016 UJ_{186}	—	October 20, 2016	Mount Lemmon	Mount Lemmon Survey	HOF	1.8 km	MPC · JPL
844337	2016 UN_{187}	—	September 3, 2019	Mount Lemmon	Mount Lemmon Survey	·	380 m	MPC · JPL
844338	2016 UP_{203}	—	April 5, 2014	Haleakala	Pan-STARRS 1	·	1.0 km	MPC · JPL
844339	2016 UU_{212}	—	January 10, 2018	Haleakala	Pan-STARRS 1	·	1.6 km	MPC · JPL
844340	2016 UC_{223}	—	April 23, 2015	Haleakala	Pan-STARRS 1	·	820 m	MPC · JPL
844341	2016 UT_{246}	—	October 28, 2016	Haleakala	Pan-STARRS 1	·	1.3 km	MPC · JPL
844342	2016 UC_{248}	—	October 21, 2016	Mount Lemmon	Mount Lemmon Survey	EOS	1.5 km	MPC · JPL
844343	2016 UO_{248}	—	October 28, 2016	Haleakala	Pan-STARRS 1	·	760 m	MPC · JPL
844344	2016 UE_{249}	—	October 13, 2016	Haleakala	Pan-STARRS 1	·	1.4 km	MPC · JPL
844345	2016 UB_{257}	—	October 21, 2016	Mount Lemmon	Mount Lemmon Survey	·	1.1 km	MPC · JPL
844346	2016 UD_{259}	—	October 26, 2016	Haleakala	Pan-STARRS 1	KON	1.5 km	MPC · JPL
844347	2016 UH_{259}	—	October 21, 2016	Mount Lemmon	Mount Lemmon Survey	KON	1.5 km	MPC · JPL
844348	2016 UX_{259}	—	October 27, 2016	Mount Lemmon	Mount Lemmon Survey	·	1.6 km	MPC · JPL
844349	2016 UD_{267}	—	October 21, 2016	Mount Lemmon	Mount Lemmon Survey	·	1.7 km	MPC · JPL
844350	2016 UW_{269}	—	October 25, 2016	Haleakala	Pan-STARRS 1	3:2	3.7 km	MPC · JPL
844351	2016 UJ_{278}	—	October 21, 2016	Mount Lemmon	Mount Lemmon Survey	·	1.5 km	MPC · JPL
844352	2016 UU_{279}	—	October 22, 2016	Mount Lemmon	Mount Lemmon Survey	V	500 m	MPC · JPL
844353	2016 UG_{280}	—	October 19, 2016	Mount Lemmon	Mount Lemmon Survey	EOS	1.3 km	MPC · JPL
844354	2016 UQ_{281}	—	October 29, 2016	Mount Lemmon	Mount Lemmon Survey	H	370 m	MPC · JPL
844355	2016 UB_{286}	—	January 5, 2013	Calar Alto	G. Hahn, S. Hellmich	AST	1.2 km	MPC · JPL
844356	2016 VT	—	November 4, 2016	Haleakala	Pan-STARRS 1	·	730 m	MPC · JPL
844357	2016 VD_{2}	—	October 9, 2016	Haleakala	Pan-STARRS 1	H	300 m	MPC · JPL
844358	2016 VS_{2}	—	July 13, 2016	Mount Lemmon	Mount Lemmon Survey	·	1.2 km	MPC · JPL
844359	2016 VC_{3}	—	March 28, 2015	Haleakala	Pan-STARRS 1	H	410 m	MPC · JPL
844360	2016 VX_{11}	—	April 29, 2010	WISE	WISE	·	2.9 km	MPC · JPL
844361	2016 VA_{12}	—	June 3, 2010	WISE	WISE	·	2.9 km	MPC · JPL
844362	2016 VF_{15}	—	March 5, 2002	Sacramento Peak	SDSS	·	2.0 km	MPC · JPL
844363	2016 VX_{15}	—	October 10, 2005	Catalina	CSS	·	4.2 km	MPC · JPL
844364	2016 VC_{17}	—	November 5, 2016	Haleakala	Pan-STARRS 1	V	430 m	MPC · JPL
844365	2016 VD_{17}	—	November 5, 2016	Haleakala	Pan-STARRS 1	·	1.1 km	MPC · JPL
844366	2016 VC_{22}	—	June 30, 2010	WISE	WISE	T_{j} (2.98)	2.7 km	MPC · JPL
844367	2016 VP_{22}	—	November 1, 2016	Mount Lemmon	Mount Lemmon Survey	·	1.9 km	MPC · JPL
844368	2016 VA_{23}	—	November 10, 2016	Haleakala	Pan-STARRS 1	JUN	740 m	MPC · JPL
844369	2016 VZ_{24}	—	October 29, 2005	Catalina	CSS	·	1.5 km	MPC · JPL
844370	2016 VO_{26}	—	November 9, 2016	Mount Lemmon	Mount Lemmon Survey	·	560 m	MPC · JPL
844371	2016 VG_{28}	—	November 6, 2016	Haleakala	Pan-STARRS 1	H	420 m	MPC · JPL
844372	2016 VB_{29}	—	November 6, 2016	Mount Lemmon	Mount Lemmon Survey	·	500 m	MPC · JPL
844373	2016 VC_{29}	—	November 4, 2016	Haleakala	Pan-STARRS 1	·	850 m	MPC · JPL
844374	2016 VE_{33}	—	November 11, 2016	Mount Lemmon	Mount Lemmon Survey	·	1.2 km	MPC · JPL
844375	2016 VS_{34}	—	November 6, 2016	Mount Lemmon	Mount Lemmon Survey	·	1.1 km	MPC · JPL
844376	2016 VW_{34}	—	November 10, 2016	Mount Lemmon	Mount Lemmon Survey	·	910 m	MPC · JPL
844377	2016 VZ_{37}	—	March 9, 2005	Catalina	CSS	BAR	930 m	MPC · JPL
844378	2016 VK_{38}	—	November 10, 2016	Haleakala	Pan-STARRS 1	·	1.5 km	MPC · JPL
844379	2016 VY_{41}	—	November 8, 2016	Mount Lemmon	Mount Lemmon Survey	·	590 m	MPC · JPL
844380	2016 VO_{44}	—	November 5, 2016	Haleakala	Pan-STARRS 1	·	1.1 km	MPC · JPL
844381	2016 VZ_{48}	—	November 15, 2016	Haleakala	Pan-STARRS 1	·	1.4 km	MPC · JPL
844382	2016 VB_{52}	—	November 8, 2016	Mount Lemmon	Mount Lemmon Survey	EOS	1.3 km	MPC · JPL
844383	2016 VK_{53}	—	November 10, 2016	Haleakala	Pan-STARRS 1	THB	2.1 km	MPC · JPL
844384	2016 VO_{54}	—	November 4, 2016	Haleakala	Pan-STARRS 1	·	1.5 km	MPC · JPL
844385	2016 VZ_{54}	—	August 9, 2015	Haleakala	Pan-STARRS 1	·	1.8 km	MPC · JPL
844386	2016 VX_{55}	—	November 6, 2016	Mount Lemmon	Mount Lemmon Survey	·	1.3 km	MPC · JPL
844387	2016 VH_{56}	—	November 10, 2016	Haleakala	Pan-STARRS 1	H	460 m	MPC · JPL
844388	2016 VJ_{56}	—	November 10, 2016	Haleakala	Pan-STARRS 1	·	1.8 km	MPC · JPL
844389	2016 VO_{58}	—	November 10, 2016	Haleakala	Pan-STARRS 1	EUP	2.9 km	MPC · JPL
844390	2016 VR_{62}	—	November 6, 2016	Mount Lemmon	Mount Lemmon Survey	·	1.3 km	MPC · JPL
844391	2016 VK_{64}	—	December 25, 2011	Mount Lemmon	Mount Lemmon Survey	·	1.8 km	MPC · JPL
844392	2016 VL_{64}	—	February 5, 2009	Mount Lemmon	Mount Lemmon Survey	·	1.0 km	MPC · JPL
844393	2016 WY_{1}	—	October 26, 2016	Mount Lemmon	Mount Lemmon Survey	H	310 m	MPC · JPL
844394	2016 WZ_{7}	—	November 25, 2016	Mount Lemmon	Mount Lemmon Survey	AMO	90 m	MPC · JPL
844395	2016 WD_{9}	—	July 5, 2016	Haleakala	Pan-STARRS 1	·	1.5 km	MPC · JPL
844396	2016 WE_{9}	—	December 24, 2006	Kitt Peak	Spacewatch	H	340 m	MPC · JPL
844397	2016 WA_{11}	—	October 21, 2016	Mount Lemmon	Mount Lemmon Survey	·	1.5 km	MPC · JPL
844398	2016 WP_{11}	—	November 10, 2016	Mount Lemmon	Mount Lemmon Survey	·	1.4 km	MPC · JPL
844399	2016 WY_{11}	—	April 30, 2010	WISE	WISE	·	2.2 km	MPC · JPL
844400	2016 WX_{14}	—	November 18, 2016	Mount Lemmon	Mount Lemmon Survey	·	450 m	MPC · JPL

== 844401–844500 ==
back to top

Designation			Discovery			Properties		Ref
Permanent	Provisional	Named after	Date	Site	Discoverer(s)	Category	Diam.	Ref
844401	2016 WK_{15}	—	November 6, 2016	Mount Lemmon	Mount Lemmon Survey	ADE	1.2 km	MPC · JPL
844402	2016 WY_{17}	—	December 8, 2005	Mount Lemmon	Mount Lemmon Survey	·	3.9 km	MPC · JPL
844403	2016 WK_{19}	—	October 27, 2011	Mount Lemmon	Mount Lemmon Survey	·	1.9 km	MPC · JPL
844404	2016 WO_{21}	—	October 20, 2011	Mount Lemmon	Mount Lemmon Survey	·	1.4 km	MPC · JPL
844405	2016 WT_{21}	—	June 15, 2010	WISE	WISE	·	2.4 km	MPC · JPL
844406	2016 WD_{22}	—	July 12, 2010	WISE	WISE	T_{j} (2.97) · EUP	3.7 km	MPC · JPL
844407	2016 WM_{31}	—	November 23, 2016	XuYi	PMO NEO Survey Program	·	1.4 km	MPC · JPL
844408	2016 WD_{33}	—	October 22, 2003	Sacramento Peak	SDSS	(5)	1.0 km	MPC · JPL
844409	2016 WE_{39}	—	November 8, 2009	Mount Lemmon	Mount Lemmon Survey	·	560 m	MPC · JPL
844410	2016 WG_{42}	—	October 24, 2003	Kitt Peak	Spacewatch	(5)	1.1 km	MPC · JPL
844411	2016 WN_{42}	—	March 20, 1999	Sacramento Peak	SDSS	·	990 m	MPC · JPL
844412	2016 WO_{42}	—	September 22, 2011	Kitt Peak	Spacewatch	AGN	880 m	MPC · JPL
844413	2016 WS_{47}	—	July 5, 2010	WISE	WISE	·	2.9 km	MPC · JPL
844414	2016 WC_{50}	—	September 18, 2010	Mount Lemmon	Mount Lemmon Survey	·	2.2 km	MPC · JPL
844415	2016 WU_{53}	—	August 6, 2010	WISE	WISE	·	2.9 km	MPC · JPL
844416	2016 WT_{56}	—	May 20, 2015	Haleakala	Pan-STARRS 1	H	350 m	MPC · JPL
844417	2016 WB_{61}	—	November 24, 2016	Haleakala	Pan-STARRS 1	·	430 m	MPC · JPL
844418	2016 WQ_{62}	—	November 24, 2016	Kitt Peak	Spacewatch	·	1.4 km	MPC · JPL
844419	2016 WX_{62}	—	November 19, 2016	Haleakala	Pan-STARRS 1	·	1.5 km	MPC · JPL
844420	2016 WR_{63}	—	November 28, 2016	Haleakala	Pan-STARRS 1	EOS	1.2 km	MPC · JPL
844421	2016 WB_{64}	—	November 25, 2016	Mount Lemmon	Mount Lemmon Survey	·	1.3 km	MPC · JPL
844422	2016 WC_{64}	—	November 20, 2016	Mount Lemmon	Mount Lemmon Survey	·	940 m	MPC · JPL
844423	2016 WZ_{64}	—	November 23, 2016	Piszkés-tető	K. Sárneczky, B. Cseh	·	1.2 km	MPC · JPL
844424	2016 WG_{66}	—	November 23, 2016	Mount Lemmon	Mount Lemmon Survey	(5)	940 m	MPC · JPL
844425	2016 WK_{66}	—	November 19, 2016	Mount Lemmon	Mount Lemmon Survey	KON	1.5 km	MPC · JPL
844426	2016 WR_{66}	—	November 20, 2016	Mount Lemmon	Mount Lemmon Survey	·	830 m	MPC · JPL
844427	2016 WR_{72}	—	May 8, 2014	Haleakala	Pan-STARRS 1	·	1.4 km	MPC · JPL
844428	2016 WQ_{74}	—	November 25, 2016	Mount Lemmon	Mount Lemmon Survey	H	440 m	MPC · JPL
844429	2016 WU_{77}	—	November 28, 2016	Haleakala	Pan-STARRS 1	·	1.3 km	MPC · JPL
844430	2016 WK_{78}	—	September 27, 2016	Haleakala	Pan-STARRS 1	ELF	2.6 km	MPC · JPL
844431	2016 WO_{82}	—	November 24, 2016	Mount Lemmon	Mount Lemmon Survey	·	2.6 km	MPC · JPL
844432	2016 WF_{88}	—	August 21, 2015	Haleakala	Pan-STARRS 1	·	2.4 km	MPC · JPL
844433	2016 XG_{2}	—	July 31, 2005	Palomar	NEAT	·	940 m	MPC · JPL
844434	2016 XY_{4}	—	December 9, 2012	Nogales	M. Schwartz, P. R. Holvorcem	·	1.5 km	MPC · JPL
844435	2016 XV_{7}	—	January 16, 2013	Haleakala	Pan-STARRS 1	·	1.2 km	MPC · JPL
844436	2016 XJ_{9}	—	November 11, 2016	Mount Lemmon	Mount Lemmon Survey	·	820 m	MPC · JPL
844437	2016 XD_{10}	—	October 2, 2011	Bergisch Gladbach	W. Bickel	·	1.6 km	MPC · JPL
844438	2016 XZ_{12}	—	September 3, 2000	Kitt Peak	Spacewatch	·	1.4 km	MPC · JPL
844439	2016 XS_{18}	—	December 20, 2009	Kitt Peak	Spacewatch	ERI	1.1 km	MPC · JPL
844440	2016 XH_{19}	—	December 10, 2012	Kitt Peak	Spacewatch	·	1.3 km	MPC · JPL
844441	2016 XS_{21}	—	June 24, 2010	WISE	WISE	·	2.4 km	MPC · JPL
844442	2016 XA_{22}	—	May 26, 2010	WISE	WISE	T_{j} (2.99)	4.0 km	MPC · JPL
844443	2016 XO_{22}	—	October 26, 2016	Mount Lemmon	Mount Lemmon Survey	·	1.6 km	MPC · JPL
844444	2016 XU_{22}	—	November 2, 2011	Mount Lemmon	Mount Lemmon Survey	EUN	1.1 km	MPC · JPL
844445	2016 XO_{25}	—	December 1, 2016	Mount Lemmon	Mount Lemmon Survey	·	670 m	MPC · JPL
844446	2016 XL_{27}	—	December 9, 2016	Mount Lemmon	Mount Lemmon Survey	GAL	1.3 km	MPC · JPL
844447	2016 XQ_{27}	—	December 1, 2016	Mount Lemmon	Mount Lemmon Survey	·	1.6 km	MPC · JPL
844448	2016 XJ_{28}	—	November 20, 2016	Mount Lemmon	Mount Lemmon Survey	·	1.7 km	MPC · JPL
844449	2016 XT_{28}	—	December 5, 2016	Mount Lemmon	Mount Lemmon Survey	EUN	900 m	MPC · JPL
844450	2016 XN_{29}	—	December 4, 2016	Bergisch Gladbach	W. Bickel	AGN	990 m	MPC · JPL
844451	2016 XD_{30}	—	December 4, 2016	Mount Lemmon	Mount Lemmon Survey	MAR	940 m	MPC · JPL
844452	2016 XU_{31}	—	December 4, 2016	Mount Lemmon	Mount Lemmon Survey	·	820 m	MPC · JPL
844453	2016 XX_{32}	—	December 5, 2016	Mount Lemmon	Mount Lemmon Survey	·	790 m	MPC · JPL
844454	2016 XK_{34}	—	December 9, 2016	Mount Lemmon	Mount Lemmon Survey	EUP	2.1 km	MPC · JPL
844455	2016 XM_{36}	—	December 5, 2016	Mount Lemmon	Mount Lemmon Survey	·	2.0 km	MPC · JPL
844456	2016 YC_{3}	—	September 1, 1997	Kleť	Kleť	H	480 m	MPC · JPL
844457	2016 YC_{6}	—	June 29, 2010	WISE	WISE	LIX	3.3 km	MPC · JPL
844458	2016 YY_{6}	—	July 30, 2010	WISE	WISE	·	1.7 km	MPC · JPL
844459	2016 YS_{7}	—	December 22, 2012	Haleakala	Pan-STARRS 1	EUN	1.3 km	MPC · JPL
844460	2016 YL_{8}	—	April 26, 2010	Mount Lemmon	Mount Lemmon Survey	H	410 m	MPC · JPL
844461	2016 YK_{9}	—	December 6, 2016	Mount Lemmon	Mount Lemmon Survey	·	1.7 km	MPC · JPL
844462	2016 YN_{9}	—	September 10, 2015	Haleakala	Pan-STARRS 1	·	2.2 km	MPC · JPL
844463	2016 YR_{13}	—	May 18, 2010	WISE	WISE	ADE	2.5 km	MPC · JPL
844464	2016 YL_{16}	—	December 23, 2016	Haleakala	Pan-STARRS 1	·	560 m	MPC · JPL
844465	2016 YN_{16}	—	December 23, 2016	Haleakala	Pan-STARRS 1	EUP	3.0 km	MPC · JPL
844466	2016 YD_{18}	—	December 27, 2016	Mount Lemmon	Mount Lemmon Survey	·	1.1 km	MPC · JPL
844467	2016 YZ_{22}	—	December 22, 2016	Haleakala	Pan-STARRS 1	·	1.3 km	MPC · JPL
844468	2016 YG_{27}	—	December 23, 2016	Haleakala	Pan-STARRS 1	HNS	700 m	MPC · JPL
844469	2016 YX_{27}	—	December 24, 2016	Mount Lemmon	Mount Lemmon Survey	·	1.7 km	MPC · JPL
844470	2016 YK_{28}	—	December 24, 2016	Mount Lemmon	Mount Lemmon Survey	H	330 m	MPC · JPL
844471	2016 YS_{31}	—	December 22, 2016	Haleakala	Pan-STARRS 1	EUP	2.9 km	MPC · JPL
844472	2016 YJ_{34}	—	December 24, 2016	Haleakala	Pan-STARRS 1	·	2.0 km	MPC · JPL
844473	2017 AO	—	August 20, 2004	Kitt Peak	Spacewatch	·	1.6 km	MPC · JPL
844474	2017 AQ	—	September 12, 2015	Haleakala	Pan-STARRS 1	EOS	1.3 km	MPC · JPL
844475	2017 AW	—	December 23, 2016	Haleakala	Pan-STARRS 1	·	2.0 km	MPC · JPL
844476	2017 AX_{4}	—	January 13, 2002	Palomar	NEAT	H	400 m	MPC · JPL
844477	2017 AN_{7}	—	May 2, 2010	WISE	WISE	·	540 m	MPC · JPL
844478	2017 AT_{9}	—	January 22, 2012	Haleakala	Pan-STARRS 1	·	2.4 km	MPC · JPL
844479	2017 AL_{12}	—	May 30, 2010	WISE	WISE	·	2.0 km	MPC · JPL
844480	2017 AK_{16}	—	January 7, 2017	Mount Lemmon	Mount Lemmon Survey	·	2.0 km	MPC · JPL
844481	2017 AR_{16}	—	January 7, 2017	Mount Lemmon	Mount Lemmon Survey	(2076)	530 m	MPC · JPL
844482	2017 AN_{18}	—	January 1, 2008	Mount Lemmon	Mount Lemmon Survey	·	1.3 km	MPC · JPL
844483	2017 AO_{18}	—	June 16, 2015	Haleakala	Pan-STARRS 1	·	1.3 km	MPC · JPL
844484	2017 AK_{21}	—	August 27, 2014	Haleakala	Pan-STARRS 1	T_{j} (2.68)	4.7 km	MPC · JPL
844485	2017 AS_{22}	—	January 3, 2011	Mount Lemmon	Mount Lemmon Survey	·	2.8 km	MPC · JPL
844486	2017 AV_{27}	—	December 2, 2016	Mount Lemmon	Mount Lemmon Survey	·	490 m	MPC · JPL
844487	2017 AO_{29}	—	January 2, 2017	Haleakala	Pan-STARRS 1	·	2.5 km	MPC · JPL
844488	2017 AB_{30}	—	January 2, 2017	Haleakala	Pan-STARRS 1	(18466)	1.9 km	MPC · JPL
844489	2017 AO_{30}	—	January 7, 2017	Mount Lemmon	Mount Lemmon Survey	BAR	780 m	MPC · JPL
844490	2017 AT_{31}	—	January 4, 2017	Haleakala	Pan-STARRS 1	H	380 m	MPC · JPL
844491	2017 AY_{32}	—	January 2, 2017	Haleakala	Pan-STARRS 1	·	2.4 km	MPC · JPL
844492	2017 AU_{34}	—	January 7, 2017	Mount Lemmon	Mount Lemmon Survey	·	2.2 km	MPC · JPL
844493	2017 AX_{35}	—	January 4, 2017	Haleakala	Pan-STARRS 1	H	410 m	MPC · JPL
844494	2017 AB_{37}	—	January 5, 2017	Mount Lemmon	Mount Lemmon Survey	·	2.1 km	MPC · JPL
844495	2017 AX_{37}	—	January 4, 2017	Haleakala	Pan-STARRS 1	·	1.9 km	MPC · JPL
844496	2017 AL_{39}	—	January 5, 2017	Mount Lemmon	Mount Lemmon Survey	·	1.2 km	MPC · JPL
844497	2017 AW_{40}	—	January 9, 2017	Mount Lemmon	Mount Lemmon Survey	·	1.3 km	MPC · JPL
844498	2017 AV_{41}	—	January 3, 2017	Haleakala	Pan-STARRS 1	·	1.0 km	MPC · JPL
844499	2017 AE_{48}	—	January 7, 2017	Mount Lemmon	Mount Lemmon Survey	·	970 m	MPC · JPL
844500	2017 AF_{50}	—	January 7, 2017	Mount Lemmon	Mount Lemmon Survey	·	1.9 km	MPC · JPL

== 844501–844600 ==
back to top

Designation			Discovery			Properties		Ref
Permanent	Provisional	Named after	Date	Site	Discoverer(s)	Category	Diam.	Ref
844501	2017 AR_{50}	—	January 2, 2017	Haleakala	Pan-STARRS 1	·	2.0 km	MPC · JPL
844502	2017 AJ_{53}	—	January 4, 2017	Haleakala	Pan-STARRS 1	·	1.5 km	MPC · JPL
844503	2017 BO_{1}	—	November 28, 2016	Haleakala	Pan-STARRS 1	H	400 m	MPC · JPL
844504	2017 BO_{2}	—	February 26, 2014	Mount Lemmon	Mount Lemmon Survey	·	1.3 km	MPC · JPL
844505	2017 BW_{2}	—	March 15, 2010	WISE	WISE	PHO	640 m	MPC · JPL
844506	2017 BG_{5}	—	December 4, 2007	Mount Lemmon	Mount Lemmon Survey	·	1.1 km	MPC · JPL
844507	2017 BL_{6}	—	December 5, 2016	Mount Lemmon	Mount Lemmon Survey	AMO · fast	200 m	MPC · JPL
844508	2017 BW_{7}	—	November 30, 2005	Mount Lemmon	Mount Lemmon Survey	PHO	660 m	MPC · JPL
844509	2017 BC_{9}	—	July 23, 2010	WISE	WISE	·	2.4 km	MPC · JPL
844510	2017 BP_{9}	—	December 21, 2016	Piszkés-tető	K. Sárneczky, L. Kriskovics	EUP	3.2 km	MPC · JPL
844511	2017 BD_{17}	—	May 16, 2010	WISE	WISE	·	2.5 km	MPC · JPL
844512	2017 BP_{22}	—	January 26, 2017	Haleakala	Pan-STARRS 1	PHO	620 m	MPC · JPL
844513	2017 BL_{23}	—	October 22, 2012	Mount Lemmon	Mount Lemmon Survey	·	720 m	MPC · JPL
844514	2017 BR_{23}	—	August 25, 2004	Kitt Peak	Spacewatch	·	1.7 km	MPC · JPL
844515	2017 BD_{36}	—	July 25, 2015	Haleakala	Pan-STARRS 1	·	1.6 km	MPC · JPL
844516	2017 BK_{36}	—	January 10, 2007	Kitt Peak	Spacewatch	·	1.3 km	MPC · JPL
844517	2017 BB_{39}	—	March 21, 1999	Sacramento Peak	SDSS	V	590 m	MPC · JPL
844518	2017 BN_{40}	—	February 21, 2012	Kitt Peak	Spacewatch	·	2.0 km	MPC · JPL
844519	2017 BK_{47}	—	December 23, 2016	Haleakala	Pan-STARRS 1	EUN	840 m	MPC · JPL
844520	2017 BW_{57}	—	January 26, 2017	Haleakala	Pan-STARRS 1	·	970 m	MPC · JPL
844521	2017 BJ_{60}	—	March 21, 1999	Sacramento Peak	SDSS	·	910 m	MPC · JPL
844522	2017 BZ_{62}	—	November 21, 2003	Kitt Peak	Spacewatch	·	820 m	MPC · JPL
844523	2017 BK_{63}	—	January 9, 2017	Mount Lemmon	Mount Lemmon Survey	·	1.6 km	MPC · JPL
844524	2017 BO_{63}	—	July 27, 2014	Haleakala	Pan-STARRS 1	·	2.0 km	MPC · JPL
844525	2017 BA_{65}	—	January 19, 2012	Mount Lemmon	Mount Lemmon Survey	·	2.3 km	MPC · JPL
844526	2017 BK_{65}	—	March 17, 2012	Mount Lemmon	Mount Lemmon Survey	EOS	1.4 km	MPC · JPL
844527	2017 BE_{69}	—	January 27, 2017	Mount Lemmon	Mount Lemmon Survey	·	2.6 km	MPC · JPL
844528	2017 BX_{69}	—	February 15, 2013	Haleakala	Pan-STARRS 1	·	1.2 km	MPC · JPL
844529	2017 BD_{75}	—	July 25, 2015	Haleakala	Pan-STARRS 1	EMA	2.2 km	MPC · JPL
844530	2017 BL_{76}	—	January 27, 2017	Haleakala	Pan-STARRS 1	·	1.4 km	MPC · JPL
844531	2017 BT_{80}	—	October 11, 2012	Haleakala	Pan-STARRS 1	·	500 m	MPC · JPL
844532	2017 BL_{81}	—	March 29, 2012	Mount Lemmon	Mount Lemmon Survey	·	1.7 km	MPC · JPL
844533	2017 BR_{81}	—	April 24, 2014	Mount Lemmon	Mount Lemmon Survey	·	510 m	MPC · JPL
844534	2017 BD_{83}	—	July 13, 2010	WISE	WISE	·	2.4 km	MPC · JPL
844535	2017 BO_{86}	—	January 12, 2010	WISE	WISE	·	1.4 km	MPC · JPL
844536	2017 BD_{91}	—	November 8, 2016	Haleakala	Pan-STARRS 1	·	980 m	MPC · JPL
844537	2017 BZ_{91}	—	May 24, 2015	Haleakala	Pan-STARRS 1	H	350 m	MPC · JPL
844538	2017 BN_{97}	—	July 25, 2015	Haleakala	Pan-STARRS 1	·	1.9 km	MPC · JPL
844539	2017 BS_{100}	—	April 6, 2010	WISE	WISE	·	1.6 km	MPC · JPL
844540	2017 BV_{105}	—	January 28, 2006	Mount Lemmon	Mount Lemmon Survey	L5	7.3 km	MPC · JPL
844541	2017 BY_{105}	—	January 28, 2017	Mount Lemmon	Mount Lemmon Survey	·	2.1 km	MPC · JPL
844542	2017 BN_{106}	—	October 4, 2002	Sacramento Peak	SDSS	EUN	1.2 km	MPC · JPL
844543	2017 BE_{107}	—	March 16, 2012	Mount Lemmon	Mount Lemmon Survey	·	2.2 km	MPC · JPL
844544	2017 BN_{109}	—	November 30, 2008	Mount Lemmon	Mount Lemmon Survey	·	860 m	MPC · JPL
844545	2017 BR_{109}	—	September 12, 2015	Haleakala	Pan-STARRS 1	·	2.3 km	MPC · JPL
844546	2017 BG_{113}	—	January 5, 2006	Mount Lemmon	Mount Lemmon Survey	·	2.3 km	MPC · JPL
844547	2017 BH_{115}	—	June 10, 2005	Kitt Peak	Spacewatch	BAR	950 m	MPC · JPL
844548	2017 BS_{117}	—	September 9, 2015	Haleakala	Pan-STARRS 1	·	1.5 km	MPC · JPL
844549	2017 BH_{119}	—	November 8, 2010	Catalina	CSS	·	2.4 km	MPC · JPL
844550	2017 BW_{119}	—	November 8, 2016	Haleakala	Pan-STARRS 1	(1547)	1.0 km	MPC · JPL
844551	2017 BD_{120}	—	November 27, 2013	Haleakala	Pan-STARRS 1	H	400 m	MPC · JPL
844552	2017 BU_{120}	—	November 14, 2010	Kitt Peak	Spacewatch	·	1.7 km	MPC · JPL
844553	2017 BU_{122}	—	February 7, 2008	Mount Lemmon	Mount Lemmon Survey	MRX	760 m	MPC · JPL
844554	2017 BG_{124}	—	May 9, 2013	Haleakala	Pan-STARRS 1	·	1.5 km	MPC · JPL
844555	2017 BC_{126}	—	March 2, 1981	Siding Spring	S. J. Bus	·	1.1 km	MPC · JPL
844556	2017 BS_{126}	—	January 31, 2006	Mount Lemmon	Mount Lemmon Survey	·	2.6 km	MPC · JPL
844557	2017 BF_{128}	—	January 26, 2017	Haleakala	Pan-STARRS 1	EOS	1.2 km	MPC · JPL
844558	2017 BA_{132}	—	January 26, 2017	Mount Lemmon	Mount Lemmon Survey	·	1.0 km	MPC · JPL
844559	2017 BS_{134}	—	January 12, 2010	WISE	WISE	(6355)	4.0 km	MPC · JPL
844560	2017 BU_{134}	—	February 26, 2012	Haleakala	Pan-STARRS 1	·	1.9 km	MPC · JPL
844561	2017 BA_{139}	—	August 29, 2014	Kitt Peak	Spacewatch	EOS	1.6 km	MPC · JPL
844562	2017 BM_{139}	—	August 3, 2014	Haleakala	Pan-STARRS 1	·	2.5 km	MPC · JPL
844563	2017 BR_{139}	—	September 2, 2014	Kitt Peak	Spacewatch	·	2.9 km	MPC · JPL
844564	2017 BS_{144}	—	January 20, 2017	Haleakala	Pan-STARRS 1	·	1.6 km	MPC · JPL
844565	2017 BP_{145}	—	June 8, 2010	WISE	WISE	PHO	760 m	MPC · JPL
844566	2017 BT_{149}	—	January 26, 2017	Mount Lemmon	Mount Lemmon Survey	HNS	900 m	MPC · JPL
844567	2017 BK_{150}	—	January 31, 2017	Mount Lemmon	Mount Lemmon Survey	EUP	2.7 km	MPC · JPL
844568	2017 BG_{151}	—	June 6, 2010	WISE	WISE	3:2	5.4 km	MPC · JPL
844569	2017 BH_{151}	—	January 26, 2017	Haleakala	Pan-STARRS 1	·	2.7 km	MPC · JPL
844570	2017 BA_{152}	—	January 27, 2017	Haleakala	Pan-STARRS 1	·	3.1 km	MPC · JPL
844571	2017 BN_{153}	—	January 27, 2017	Mount Lemmon	Mount Lemmon Survey	·	1.1 km	MPC · JPL
844572	2017 BX_{155}	—	January 28, 2017	Haleakala	Pan-STARRS 1	NYS	710 m	MPC · JPL
844573	2017 BJ_{156}	—	January 26, 2017	Mount Lemmon	Mount Lemmon Survey	·	510 m	MPC · JPL
844574	2017 BM_{157}	—	January 28, 2017	Haleakala	Pan-STARRS 1	V	500 m	MPC · JPL
844575	2017 BW_{157}	—	January 28, 2017	Haleakala	Pan-STARRS 1	·	1.4 km	MPC · JPL
844576	2017 BB_{158}	—	January 27, 2017	Haleakala	Pan-STARRS 1	NYS	790 m	MPC · JPL
844577	2017 BT_{158}	—	January 28, 2017	Haleakala	Pan-STARRS 1	·	1.4 km	MPC · JPL
844578	2017 BU_{158}	—	January 26, 2017	Haleakala	Pan-STARRS 1	·	400 m	MPC · JPL
844579	2017 BT_{159}	—	October 11, 2015	Mount Lemmon	Mount Lemmon Survey	·	2.1 km	MPC · JPL
844580	2017 BB_{161}	—	January 29, 2017	Haleakala	Pan-STARRS 1	H	350 m	MPC · JPL
844581	2017 BS_{163}	—	January 19, 2017	Mount Lemmon	Mount Lemmon Survey	·	2.1 km	MPC · JPL
844582	2017 BR_{164}	—	January 30, 2017	Haleakala	Pan-STARRS 1	·	2.0 km	MPC · JPL
844583	2017 BE_{165}	—	January 26, 2017	Mount Lemmon	Mount Lemmon Survey	EOS	1.4 km	MPC · JPL
844584	2017 BG_{165}	—	January 31, 2017	Mount Lemmon	Mount Lemmon Survey	·	1.2 km	MPC · JPL
844585	2017 BH_{165}	—	January 26, 2017	Haleakala	Pan-STARRS 1	·	2.3 km	MPC · JPL
844586	2017 BJ_{165}	—	January 27, 2017	Mount Lemmon	Mount Lemmon Survey	·	1.1 km	MPC · JPL
844587	2017 BS_{165}	—	January 26, 2017	Haleakala	Pan-STARRS 1	·	550 m	MPC · JPL
844588	2017 BD_{166}	—	January 31, 2017	Mount Lemmon	Mount Lemmon Survey	·	1.7 km	MPC · JPL
844589	2017 BF_{166}	—	January 30, 2017	Mount Lemmon	Mount Lemmon Survey	·	3.2 km	MPC · JPL
844590	2017 BW_{166}	—	January 26, 2017	Mount Lemmon	Mount Lemmon Survey	EOS	1.3 km	MPC · JPL
844591	2017 BP_{168}	—	January 26, 2017	Haleakala	Pan-STARRS 1	·	2.3 km	MPC · JPL
844592	2017 BT_{168}	—	January 20, 2017	Haleakala	Pan-STARRS 1	EOS	1.5 km	MPC · JPL
844593	2017 BU_{170}	—	November 16, 2003	Kitt Peak	Spacewatch	·	940 m	MPC · JPL
844594	2017 BW_{175}	—	January 27, 2017	Haleakala	Pan-STARRS 1	(2076)	500 m	MPC · JPL
844595	2017 BP_{180}	—	January 28, 2017	Haleakala	Pan-STARRS 1	·	1.0 km	MPC · JPL
844596	2017 BF_{181}	—	January 28, 2017	Haleakala	Pan-STARRS 1	L5	5.9 km	MPC · JPL
844597	2017 BA_{184}	—	June 16, 2014	Mount Lemmon	Mount Lemmon Survey	·	650 m	MPC · JPL
844598	2017 BK_{185}	—	January 26, 2017	Haleakala	Pan-STARRS 1	·	2.5 km	MPC · JPL
844599	2017 BP_{185}	—	January 26, 2017	Mount Lemmon	Mount Lemmon Survey	·	1.9 km	MPC · JPL
844600	2017 BU_{185}	—	January 27, 2017	Mount Lemmon	Mount Lemmon Survey	·	1.5 km	MPC · JPL

== 844601–844700 ==
back to top

Designation			Discovery			Properties		Ref
Permanent	Provisional	Named after	Date	Site	Discoverer(s)	Category	Diam.	Ref
844601	2017 BW_{185}	—	August 14, 2012	Siding Spring	SSS	·	560 m	MPC · JPL
844602	2017 BB_{186}	—	January 27, 2017	Haleakala	Pan-STARRS 1	·	530 m	MPC · JPL
844603	2017 BO_{187}	—	January 27, 2017	Mount Lemmon	Mount Lemmon Survey	·	1.9 km	MPC · JPL
844604	2017 BF_{189}	—	January 31, 2009	Mount Lemmon	Mount Lemmon Survey	3:2	4.5 km	MPC · JPL
844605	2017 BB_{193}	—	January 31, 2017	Haleakala	Pan-STARRS 1	·	2.9 km	MPC · JPL
844606	2017 BK_{195}	—	February 25, 2007	Kitt Peak	Spacewatch	H	320 m	MPC · JPL
844607	2017 BJ_{196}	—	January 30, 2017	Haleakala	Pan-STARRS 1	HOF	1.9 km	MPC · JPL
844608	2017 BR_{196}	—	January 27, 2017	Haleakala	Pan-STARRS 1	·	490 m	MPC · JPL
844609	2017 BU_{201}	—	October 13, 2015	Haleakala	Pan-STARRS 1	URS	2.3 km	MPC · JPL
844610	2017 BR_{203}	—	January 30, 2017	Kitt Peak	Spacewatch	·	990 m	MPC · JPL
844611	2017 BD_{208}	—	January 27, 2017	Mount Lemmon	Mount Lemmon Survey	·	1.1 km	MPC · JPL
844612	2017 BQ_{209}	—	January 28, 2017	Haleakala	Pan-STARRS 1	·	900 m	MPC · JPL
844613	2017 BR_{212}	—	January 28, 2017	Haleakala	Pan-STARRS 1	·	1.9 km	MPC · JPL
844614	2017 BE_{222}	—	January 31, 2017	Haleakala	Pan-STARRS 1	·	1.3 km	MPC · JPL
844615	2017 BU_{259}	—	January 27, 2017	Haleakala	Pan-STARRS 1	·	940 m	MPC · JPL
844616	2017 BT_{262}	—	January 27, 2017	Haleakala	Pan-STARRS 1	·	1.3 km	MPC · JPL
844617	2017 CQ_{5}	—	February 1, 2012	Catalina	CSS	H	450 m	MPC · JPL
844618	2017 CZ_{9}	—	February 1, 2017	Mount Lemmon	Mount Lemmon Survey	·	670 m	MPC · JPL
844619	2017 CD_{10}	—	January 2, 2011	Mount Lemmon	Mount Lemmon Survey	VER	1.9 km	MPC · JPL
844620	2017 CW_{10}	—	November 6, 2012	Kitt Peak	Spacewatch	·	620 m	MPC · JPL
844621	2017 CM_{12}	—	October 10, 2002	Sacramento Peak	SDSS	·	2.8 km	MPC · JPL
844622	2017 CF_{17}	—	February 3, 2017	Mount Lemmon	Mount Lemmon Survey	·	2.3 km	MPC · JPL
844623	2017 CQ_{18}	—	June 24, 2011	Mount Lemmon	Mount Lemmon Survey	V	480 m	MPC · JPL
844624	2017 CH_{19}	—	February 25, 2012	Mount Lemmon	Mount Lemmon Survey	·	2.0 km	MPC · JPL
844625	2017 CL_{20}	—	October 2, 2006	Mount Lemmon	Mount Lemmon Survey	·	1.3 km	MPC · JPL
844626	2017 CC_{21}	—	January 28, 2017	Haleakala	Pan-STARRS 1	·	770 m	MPC · JPL
844627	2017 CD_{21}	—	February 15, 2012	Haleakala	Pan-STARRS 1	·	1.1 km	MPC · JPL
844628	2017 CZ_{25}	—	January 4, 2011	Mount Lemmon	Mount Lemmon Survey	VER	2.0 km	MPC · JPL
844629	2017 CJ_{27}	—	January 28, 2017	Haleakala	Pan-STARRS 1	·	2.3 km	MPC · JPL
844630	2017 CM_{29}	—	September 12, 2015	Haleakala	Pan-STARRS 1	·	1.8 km	MPC · JPL
844631	2017 CB_{33}	—	March 26, 2010	WISE	WISE	PHO	750 m	MPC · JPL
844632	2017 CP_{36}	—	February 8, 2017	Mount Lemmon	Mount Lemmon Survey	H	380 m	MPC · JPL
844633	2017 CZ_{37}	—	February 4, 2017	Haleakala	Pan-STARRS 1	PHO	650 m	MPC · JPL
844634	2017 CN_{39}	—	February 3, 2017	Haleakala	Pan-STARRS 1	·	410 m	MPC · JPL
844635	2017 CW_{39}	—	February 4, 2017	Haleakala	Pan-STARRS 1	T_{j} (2.99)	2.1 km	MPC · JPL
844636	2017 CT_{42}	—	March 26, 2003	Palomar	NEAT	·	770 m	MPC · JPL
844637	2017 CZ_{51}	—	September 18, 2014	Haleakala	Pan-STARRS 1	·	2.3 km	MPC · JPL
844638	2017 DF_{2}	—	September 19, 2009	Mount Lemmon	Mount Lemmon Survey	EOS	1.4 km	MPC · JPL
844639	2017 DF_{5}	—	December 5, 2005	Kitt Peak	Spacewatch	·	1.7 km	MPC · JPL
844640	2017 DP_{6}	—	September 24, 2008	Mount Lemmon	Mount Lemmon Survey	H	340 m	MPC · JPL
844641	2017 DS_{6}	—	August 8, 2010	WISE	WISE	·	3.2 km	MPC · JPL
844642	2017 DV_{7}	—	January 7, 2017	Mount Lemmon	Mount Lemmon Survey	·	2.7 km	MPC · JPL
844643	2017 DO_{10}	—	March 21, 1999	Sacramento Peak	SDSS	·	1.2 km	MPC · JPL
844644	2017 DP_{12}	—	March 20, 1999	Sacramento Peak	SDSS	GEF	940 m	MPC · JPL
844645	2017 DW_{12}	—	April 1, 2012	Mount Lemmon	Mount Lemmon Survey	·	1.9 km	MPC · JPL
844646	2017 DB_{19}	—	November 8, 2015	Mount Lemmon	Mount Lemmon Survey	·	1.2 km	MPC · JPL
844647	2017 DM_{20}	—	January 4, 2017	Haleakala	Pan-STARRS 1	·	1.2 km	MPC · JPL
844648	2017 DO_{22}	—	January 27, 2017	Haleakala	Pan-STARRS 1	·	2.2 km	MPC · JPL
844649	2017 DT_{27}	—	November 14, 2015	Mount Lemmon	Mount Lemmon Survey	(1298)	2.2 km	MPC · JPL
844650	2017 DQ_{30}	—	October 16, 2009	Mount Lemmon	Mount Lemmon Survey	·	1.9 km	MPC · JPL
844651	2017 DW_{36}	—	January 3, 2017	Haleakala	Pan-STARRS 1	H	490 m	MPC · JPL
844652	2017 DP_{37}	—	February 28, 2009	Kitt Peak	Spacewatch	H	460 m	MPC · JPL
844653	2017 DW_{41}	—	September 18, 2009	Mount Lemmon	Mount Lemmon Survey	EOS	1.5 km	MPC · JPL
844654	2017 DR_{45}	—	February 27, 2000	Kitt Peak	Spacewatch	·	2.4 km	MPC · JPL
844655	2017 DN_{47}	—	January 27, 2017	Haleakala	Pan-STARRS 1	critical	970 m	MPC · JPL
844656	2017 DE_{53}	—	January 17, 2009	Kitt Peak	Spacewatch	·	660 m	MPC · JPL
844657	2017 DE_{56}	—	October 5, 2002	Sacramento Peak	SDSS	HNS	1.2 km	MPC · JPL
844658	2017 DB_{66}	—	February 7, 2011	Mount Lemmon	Mount Lemmon Survey	·	2.2 km	MPC · JPL
844659	2017 DY_{67}	—	June 12, 2010	WISE	WISE	·	1.2 km	MPC · JPL
844660	2017 DG_{68}	—	April 19, 2012	Mount Lemmon	Mount Lemmon Survey	·	2.6 km	MPC · JPL
844661	2017 DM_{70}	—	November 1, 2015	Kitt Peak	Spacewatch	AGN	780 m	MPC · JPL
844662	2017 DJ_{72}	—	September 22, 2009	Kitt Peak	Spacewatch	·	2.3 km	MPC · JPL
844663	2017 DY_{72}	—	January 3, 2017	Haleakala	Pan-STARRS 1	JUN	810 m	MPC · JPL
844664	2017 DS_{73}	—	October 5, 2002	Sacramento Peak	SDSS	·	1.2 km	MPC · JPL
844665	2017 DB_{74}	—	March 2, 2008	Kitt Peak	Spacewatch	·	1.1 km	MPC · JPL
844666	2017 DF_{75}	—	February 12, 2011	Mount Lemmon	Mount Lemmon Survey	·	2.4 km	MPC · JPL
844667	2017 DT_{76}	—	January 31, 2011	Piszkés-tető	K. Sárneczky, Z. Kuli	THB	2.5 km	MPC · JPL
844668	2017 DM_{78}	—	January 3, 2017	Haleakala	Pan-STARRS 1	·	530 m	MPC · JPL
844669	2017 DP_{80}	—	October 29, 2002	Sacramento Peak	SDSS	HNS	1.2 km	MPC · JPL
844670	2017 DQ_{84}	—	August 22, 2003	Palomar	NEAT	H	380 m	MPC · JPL
844671	2017 DO_{86}	—	February 28, 2012	Haleakala	Pan-STARRS 1	·	1.8 km	MPC · JPL
844672	2017 DA_{91}	—	January 4, 2017	Haleakala	Pan-STARRS 1	GEF	890 m	MPC · JPL
844673	2017 DF_{94}	—	January 14, 2011	Kitt Peak	Spacewatch	LIX	2.1 km	MPC · JPL
844674	2017 DK_{94}	—	October 11, 1996	Mauna Kea	D. D. Balam	·	1.1 km	MPC · JPL
844675	2017 DD_{103}	—	September 2, 2011	Haleakala	Pan-STARRS 1	·	630 m	MPC · JPL
844676	2017 DD_{115}	—	January 30, 2017	Haleakala	Pan-STARRS 1	·	1.4 km	MPC · JPL
844677	2017 DH_{116}	—	March 12, 2010	Catalina	CSS	PHO	660 m	MPC · JPL
844678	2017 DL_{116}	—	January 25, 2012	Haleakala	Pan-STARRS 1	·	1.7 km	MPC · JPL
844679	2017 DV_{119}	—	March 20, 2010	Mount Lemmon	Mount Lemmon Survey	·	1.1 km	MPC · JPL
844680	2017 DB_{121}	—	August 20, 2014	Haleakala	Pan-STARRS 1	·	2.3 km	MPC · JPL
844681	2017 DJ_{125}	—	February 21, 2017	Haleakala	Pan-STARRS 1	H	290 m	MPC · JPL
844682	2017 DV_{126}	—	February 21, 2017	Haleakala	Pan-STARRS 1	·	2.0 km	MPC · JPL
844683	2017 DX_{126}	—	February 17, 2017	Haleakala	Pan-STARRS 1	H	280 m	MPC · JPL
844684	2017 DK_{131}	—	February 21, 2017	Haleakala	Pan-STARRS 1	·	590 m	MPC · JPL
844685	2017 DE_{132}	—	February 24, 2017	Haleakala	Pan-STARRS 1	H	340 m	MPC · JPL
844686	2017 DN_{133}	—	February 21, 2017	Mount Lemmon	Mount Lemmon Survey	·	2.0 km	MPC · JPL
844687	2017 DP_{133}	—	February 22, 2017	Haleakala	Pan-STARRS 1	·	2.3 km	MPC · JPL
844688	2017 DR_{133}	—	February 22, 2017	Mount Lemmon	Mount Lemmon Survey	·	2.1 km	MPC · JPL
844689	2017 DT_{133}	—	February 22, 2017	Haleakala	Pan-STARRS 1	·	2.3 km	MPC · JPL
844690	2017 DA_{134}	—	February 18, 2017	Haleakala	Pan-STARRS 1	·	2.8 km	MPC · JPL
844691	2017 DB_{134}	—	February 21, 2017	Mount Lemmon	Mount Lemmon Survey	H	380 m	MPC · JPL
844692	2017 DJ_{134}	—	February 18, 2017	Haleakala	Pan-STARRS 1	EOS	1.4 km	MPC · JPL
844693	2017 DH_{138}	—	February 21, 2017	Haleakala	Pan-STARRS 1	·	1.1 km	MPC · JPL
844694	2017 DK_{138}	—	February 21, 2017	Haleakala	Pan-STARRS 1	·	550 m	MPC · JPL
844695	2017 DC_{142}	—	February 22, 2017	Mount Lemmon	Mount Lemmon Survey	EOS	1.5 km	MPC · JPL
844696	2017 DG_{144}	—	February 22, 2017	Mount Lemmon	Mount Lemmon Survey	·	850 m	MPC · JPL
844697	2017 DE_{146}	—	February 24, 2017	Haleakala	Pan-STARRS 1	·	2.0 km	MPC · JPL
844698	2017 DH_{155}	—	September 25, 2012	Mount Lemmon	Mount Lemmon Survey	L5	6.5 km	MPC · JPL
844699	2017 DK_{159}	—	February 22, 2017	Haleakala	Pan-STARRS 1	·	680 m	MPC · JPL
844700	2017 EU_{1}	—	February 2, 2017	Haleakala	Pan-STARRS 1	H	390 m	MPC · JPL

== 844701–844800 ==
back to top

Designation			Discovery			Properties		Ref
Permanent	Provisional	Named after	Date	Site	Discoverer(s)	Category	Diam.	Ref
844701	2017 EQ_{9}	—	March 15, 2010	Kitt Peak	Spacewatch	·	760 m	MPC · JPL
844702	2017 EM_{13}	—	February 1, 2010	WISE	WISE	T_{j} (2.98)	2.6 km	MPC · JPL
844703	2017 EZ_{13}	—	January 30, 2008	Mount Lemmon	Mount Lemmon Survey	·	1.4 km	MPC · JPL
844704	2017 EH_{17}	—	March 4, 2017	Haleakala	Pan-STARRS 1	·	2.4 km	MPC · JPL
844705	2017 EB_{19}	—	March 29, 1998	Piszkés-tető	Kelemen, J.	DOR	2.4 km	MPC · JPL
844706	2017 EU_{19}	—	February 4, 2017	Haleakala	Pan-STARRS 1	·	1.7 km	MPC · JPL
844707	2017 ER_{22}	—	March 13, 2017	Haleakala	Pan-STARRS 1	APO	440 m	MPC · JPL
844708	2017 EB_{28}	—	March 4, 2017	Haleakala	Pan-STARRS 1	·	2.1 km	MPC · JPL
844709	2017 EJ_{29}	—	May 3, 2006	Kitt Peak	Spacewatch	THB	1.9 km	MPC · JPL
844710	2017 EH_{30}	—	October 18, 2012	Haleakala	Pan-STARRS 1	·	400 m	MPC · JPL
844711	2017 EP_{34}	—	March 5, 2017	Haleakala	Pan-STARRS 1	(116763)	1.4 km	MPC · JPL
844712	2017 EX_{38}	—	March 5, 2017	Haleakala	Pan-STARRS 1	·	850 m	MPC · JPL
844713	2017 EL_{39}	—	March 2, 2017	Mount Lemmon	Mount Lemmon Survey	H	370 m	MPC · JPL
844714	2017 EX_{39}	—	March 5, 2017	Haleakala	Pan-STARRS 1	·	2.4 km	MPC · JPL
844715	2017 EW_{48}	—	March 4, 2017	Haleakala	Pan-STARRS 1	·	1.6 km	MPC · JPL
844716	2017 FC_{7}	—	March 25, 2006	Mount Lemmon	Mount Lemmon Survey	·	2.4 km	MPC · JPL
844717	2017 FG_{12}	—	December 31, 2011	Mayhill-ISON	L. Elenin	·	1.4 km	MPC · JPL
844718	2017 FO_{12}	—	March 19, 2010	Catalina	CSS	·	1.5 km	MPC · JPL
844719	2017 FA_{15}	—	February 21, 2006	Mount Lemmon	Mount Lemmon Survey	THM	1.5 km	MPC · JPL
844720	2017 FL_{15}	—	May 6, 2014	Haleakala	Pan-STARRS 1	·	510 m	MPC · JPL
844721	2017 FP_{15}	—	September 25, 1998	Kitt Peak	Spacewatch	·	2.3 km	MPC · JPL
844722	2017 FB_{16}	—	January 28, 2017	Haleakala	Pan-STARRS 1	·	810 m	MPC · JPL
844723	2017 FT_{18}	—	October 14, 2001	Sacramento Peak	SDSS	ADE	1.4 km	MPC · JPL
844724	2017 FM_{22}	—	September 29, 2011	Mount Lemmon	Mount Lemmon Survey	·	780 m	MPC · JPL
844725	2017 FL_{25}	—	September 26, 2000	Sacramento Peak	SDSS	V	540 m	MPC · JPL
844726	2017 FC_{29}	—	October 1, 2014	Haleakala	Pan-STARRS 1	·	1.8 km	MPC · JPL
844727	2017 FE_{31}	—	March 15, 2010	WISE	WISE	·	3.7 km	MPC · JPL
844728	2017 FT_{35}	—	April 17, 2010	Mount Lemmon	Mount Lemmon Survey	·	710 m	MPC · JPL
844729	2017 FN_{43}	—	October 7, 2007	Mount Lemmon	Mount Lemmon Survey	PHO	660 m	MPC · JPL
844730	2017 FZ_{46}	—	April 27, 2012	Haleakala	Pan-STARRS 1	VER	2.4 km	MPC · JPL
844731	2017 FC_{49}	—	October 14, 2015	Kitt Peak	Spacewatch	EUN	840 m	MPC · JPL
844732	2017 FW_{49}	—	February 2, 2010	WISE	WISE	·	3.1 km	MPC · JPL
844733	2017 FY_{53}	—	February 10, 2010	WISE	WISE	LUT	3.1 km	MPC · JPL
844734	2017 FK_{56}	—	September 25, 2009	Kitt Peak	Spacewatch	·	1.9 km	MPC · JPL
844735	2017 FV_{57}	—	January 23, 2006	Kitt Peak	Spacewatch	·	1.5 km	MPC · JPL
844736	2017 FP_{58}	—	February 3, 2010	WISE	WISE	·	3.1 km	MPC · JPL
844737	2017 FQ_{59}	—	April 9, 2010	Kitt Peak	Spacewatch	·	820 m	MPC · JPL
844738	2017 FS_{63}	—	March 19, 2007	Anderson Mesa	LONEOS	H	450 m	MPC · JPL
844739	2017 FT_{65}	—	January 2, 2017	Haleakala	Pan-STARRS 1	·	510 m	MPC · JPL
844740	2017 FU_{71}	—	January 6, 2010	Mount Lemmon	Mount Lemmon Survey	·	560 m	MPC · JPL
844741	2017 FX_{74}	—	March 17, 2017	Mount Lemmon	Mount Lemmon Survey	·	630 m	MPC · JPL
844742	2017 FG_{84}	—	February 22, 2017	Mount Lemmon	Mount Lemmon Survey	·	2.0 km	MPC · JPL
844743	2017 FJ_{85}	—	March 29, 2012	Kitt Peak	Spacewatch	·	1.7 km	MPC · JPL
844744	2017 FY_{92}	—	March 21, 2017	Haleakala	Pan-STARRS 1	·	1.6 km	MPC · JPL
844745	2017 FF_{98}	—	April 7, 2010	Kitt Peak	Spacewatch	·	720 m	MPC · JPL
844746	2017 FB_{101}	—	October 29, 2010	Catalina	CSS	H	560 m	MPC · JPL
844747	2017 FH_{102}	—	March 26, 2017	Mount Lemmon	Mount Lemmon Survey	H	300 m	MPC · JPL
844748	2017 FJ_{109}	—	February 28, 2008	Kitt Peak	Spacewatch	·	1.6 km	MPC · JPL
844749	2017 FQ_{114}	—	March 26, 2017	Mount Lemmon	Mount Lemmon Survey	EOS	1.3 km	MPC · JPL
844750	2017 FZ_{117}	—	March 20, 1999	Sacramento Peak	SDSS	·	880 m	MPC · JPL
844751	2017 FS_{122}	—	January 20, 2013	Kitt Peak	Spacewatch	MAS	570 m	MPC · JPL
844752	2017 FR_{137}	—	April 27, 2008	Mount Lemmon	Mount Lemmon Survey	·	1.2 km	MPC · JPL
844753	2017 FW_{137}	—	February 21, 2017	Haleakala	Pan-STARRS 1	·	1.2 km	MPC · JPL
844754	2017 FP_{138}	—	February 24, 2010	WISE	WISE	LUT	3.3 km	MPC · JPL
844755	2017 FD_{139}	—	January 27, 2017	Haleakala	Pan-STARRS 1	·	820 m	MPC · JPL
844756	2017 FP_{144}	—	March 27, 2017	Haleakala	Pan-STARRS 1	·	1.3 km	MPC · JPL
844757	2017 FC_{151}	—	March 21, 2017	Haleakala	Pan-STARRS 1	·	500 m	MPC · JPL
844758	2017 FB_{159}	—	April 21, 1998	Socorro	LINEAR	·	930 m	MPC · JPL
844759	2017 FH_{163}	—	March 26, 2017	Haleakala	Pan-STARRS 1	·	1.3 km	MPC · JPL
844760	2017 FZ_{163}	—	December 22, 2012	Haleakala	Pan-STARRS 1	·	720 m	MPC · JPL
844761	2017 FC_{164}	—	January 20, 2013	Kitt Peak	Spacewatch	·	890 m	MPC · JPL
844762	2017 FT_{168}	—	March 19, 2017	Haleakala	Pan-STARRS 1	·	2.2 km	MPC · JPL
844763	2017 FS_{169}	—	March 27, 2017	Mount Lemmon	Mount Lemmon Survey	H	420 m	MPC · JPL
844764	2017 FO_{171}	—	March 22, 2017	Haleakala	Pan-STARRS 1	·	1.9 km	MPC · JPL
844765	2017 FJ_{175}	—	March 21, 2017	Haleakala	Pan-STARRS 1	LIX	2.7 km	MPC · JPL
844766	2017 FK_{180}	—	March 19, 2017	Haleakala	Pan-STARRS 1	·	2.1 km	MPC · JPL
844767	2017 FV_{184}	—	March 29, 2011	Mount Lemmon	Mount Lemmon Survey	·	1.8 km	MPC · JPL
844768	2017 FD_{193}	—	January 14, 2016	Haleakala	Pan-STARRS 1	·	2.6 km	MPC · JPL
844769	2017 FV_{197}	—	March 21, 2017	Haleakala	Pan-STARRS 1	·	1.7 km	MPC · JPL
844770	2017 FE_{200}	—	March 21, 2017	Haleakala	Pan-STARRS 1	(1118)	2.3 km	MPC · JPL
844771	2017 FH_{206}	—	August 13, 2013	Haleakala	Pan-STARRS 1	·	2.5 km	MPC · JPL
844772	2017 FF_{219}	—	December 10, 2015	Mount Lemmon	Mount Lemmon Survey	·	2.2 km	MPC · JPL
844773	2017 FE_{220}	—	March 21, 2017	Haleakala	Pan-STARRS 1	·	2.0 km	MPC · JPL
844774	2017 FS_{224}	—	March 27, 2017	Haleakala	Pan-STARRS 1	·	1.3 km	MPC · JPL
844775	2017 FV_{237}	—	March 18, 2017	Haleakala	Pan-STARRS 1	·	2.7 km	MPC · JPL
844776	2017 FB_{253}	—	March 19, 2017	Haleakala	Pan-STARRS 1	·	1.3 km	MPC · JPL
844777	2017 FP_{253}	—	March 18, 2017	Haleakala	Pan-STARRS 1	·	1.2 km	MPC · JPL
844778	2017 GT_{1}	—	May 13, 2012	Mount Lemmon	Mount Lemmon Survey	·	2.2 km	MPC · JPL
844779	2017 GO_{2}	—	October 18, 2014	Teide	Serra-Ricart, M., Bosch, J. M.	·	2.0 km	MPC · JPL
844780	2017 GW_{2}	—	November 7, 2015	Mount Lemmon	Mount Lemmon Survey	·	630 m	MPC · JPL
844781	2017 GW_{9}	—	February 9, 2016	Haleakala	Pan-STARRS 1	LIX	2.8 km	MPC · JPL
844782	2017 GG_{14}	—	April 6, 2017	Haleakala	Pan-STARRS 1	H	510 m	MPC · JPL
844783	2017 GE_{18}	—	April 4, 2017	Haleakala	Pan-STARRS 1	·	520 m	MPC · JPL
844784	2017 GY_{19}	—	April 6, 2017	Mount Lemmon	Mount Lemmon Survey	·	1.6 km	MPC · JPL
844785	2017 GK_{21}	—	April 7, 2017	Haleakala	Pan-STARRS 1	MAR	730 m	MPC · JPL
844786	2017 GZ_{23}	—	April 2, 2017	Haleakala	Pan-STARRS 1	·	2.5 km	MPC · JPL
844787	2017 HX_{5}	—	January 22, 2010	WISE	WISE	·	2.7 km	MPC · JPL
844788	2017 HL_{7}	—	October 10, 2002	Sacramento Peak	SDSS	·	960 m	MPC · JPL
844789	2017 HB_{9}	—	May 9, 2010	WISE	WISE	·	1.2 km	MPC · JPL
844790	2017 HD_{10}	—	July 9, 2013	Haleakala	Pan-STARRS 1	·	1.9 km	MPC · JPL
844791	2017 HD_{11}	—	March 19, 2017	Mount Lemmon	Mount Lemmon Survey	·	600 m	MPC · JPL
844792	2017 HQ_{13}	—	April 16, 2004	Kitt Peak	Spacewatch	·	1.2 km	MPC · JPL
844793	2017 HB_{14}	—	March 2, 2011	Kitt Peak	Spacewatch	·	2.0 km	MPC · JPL
844794	2017 HC_{15}	—	October 20, 2011	Mount Lemmon	Mount Lemmon Survey	·	1.1 km	MPC · JPL
844795	2017 HV_{20}	—	March 23, 2017	Haleakala	Pan-STARRS 1	·	2.2 km	MPC · JPL
844796	2017 HR_{31}	—	March 14, 2012	Haleakala	Pan-STARRS 1	·	1.5 km	MPC · JPL
844797	2017 HJ_{36}	—	June 26, 2010	WISE	WISE	·	1.3 km	MPC · JPL
844798	2017 HD_{37}	—	January 17, 2016	Haleakala	Pan-STARRS 1	·	1.7 km	MPC · JPL
844799	2017 HR_{40}	—	September 23, 2009	Mount Lemmon	Mount Lemmon Survey	MIS	1.9 km	MPC · JPL
844800	2017 HG_{44}	—	February 6, 2011	Catalina	CSS	·	2.1 km	MPC · JPL

== 844801–844900 ==
back to top

Designation			Discovery			Properties		Ref
Permanent	Provisional	Named after	Date	Site	Discoverer(s)	Category	Diam.	Ref
844801	2017 HA_{45}	—	March 18, 2010	WISE	WISE	·	2.6 km	MPC · JPL
844802	2017 HN_{45}	—	March 23, 2017	Haleakala	Pan-STARRS 1	·	1.6 km	MPC · JPL
844803	2017 HL_{46}	—	January 28, 2006	Mount Lemmon	Mount Lemmon Survey	·	1.7 km	MPC · JPL
844804	2017 HT_{47}	—	July 27, 2011	Haleakala	Pan-STARRS 1	·	490 m	MPC · JPL
844805	2017 HA_{50}	—	May 4, 2000	Sacramento Peak	SDSS	·	2.7 km	MPC · JPL
844806	2017 HH_{53}	—	January 17, 2013	Haleakala	Pan-STARRS 1	·	470 m	MPC · JPL
844807	2017 HY_{64}	—	April 25, 2017	Mount Lemmon	Mount Lemmon Survey	H	460 m	MPC · JPL
844808	2017 HT_{66}	—	April 26, 2017	Haleakala	Pan-STARRS 1	·	1.5 km	MPC · JPL
844809	2017 HZ_{68}	—	April 27, 2017	Haleakala	Pan-STARRS 1	·	680 m	MPC · JPL
844810	2017 HT_{74}	—	April 28, 2017	Haleakala	Pan-STARRS 1	·	2.3 km	MPC · JPL
844811	2017 HD_{84}	—	April 26, 2017	Haleakala	Pan-STARRS 1	·	1.6 km	MPC · JPL
844812	2017 HM_{92}	—	April 26, 2017	Haleakala	Pan-STARRS 1	URS	2.0 km	MPC · JPL
844813	2017 HQ_{94}	—	February 6, 2016	Haleakala	Pan-STARRS 1	·	1.3 km	MPC · JPL
844814	2017 HK_{98}	—	April 21, 2017	Kitt Peak	Spacewatch	·	750 m	MPC · JPL
844815	2017 HC_{103}	—	April 25, 2017	Haleakala	Pan-STARRS 1	·	1.3 km	MPC · JPL
844816	2017 HB_{105}	—	October 1, 2014	Haleakala	Pan-STARRS 1	·	1.3 km	MPC · JPL
844817	2017 JD_{1}	—	April 4, 2017	Haleakala	Pan-STARRS 1	H	440 m	MPC · JPL
844818	2017 JB_{3}	—	May 16, 2012	Haleakala	Pan-STARRS 1	H	350 m	MPC · JPL
844819	2017 JR_{8}	—	May 15, 2017	Mount Lemmon	Mount Lemmon Survey	EUN	760 m	MPC · JPL
844820	2017 JB_{10}	—	May 6, 2017	Haleakala	Pan-STARRS 1	·	1.3 km	MPC · JPL
844821	2017 JF_{12}	—	May 6, 2017	Haleakala	Pan-STARRS 1	TIR	1.9 km	MPC · JPL
844822	2017 KL_{2}	—	April 25, 2017	Mount Lemmon	Mount Lemmon Survey	H	500 m	MPC · JPL
844823	2017 KT_{5}	—	October 14, 2001	Sacramento Peak	SDSS	BRG	1.3 km	MPC · JPL
844824	2017 KX_{13}	—	March 4, 2011	Mount Lemmon	Mount Lemmon Survey	·	1.9 km	MPC · JPL
844825	2017 KA_{14}	—	September 2, 2014	Haleakala	Pan-STARRS 1	·	960 m	MPC · JPL
844826	2017 KC_{14}	—	January 17, 2009	Mount Lemmon	Mount Lemmon Survey	·	860 m	MPC · JPL
844827	2017 KT_{20}	—	August 28, 2014	Haleakala	Pan-STARRS 1	·	540 m	MPC · JPL
844828	2017 KG_{22}	—	March 15, 2010	WISE	WISE	·	2.5 km	MPC · JPL
844829	2017 KS_{23}	—	May 4, 2017	Haleakala	Pan-STARRS 1	·	1.6 km	MPC · JPL
844830	2017 KE_{24}	—	July 25, 2014	Haleakala	Pan-STARRS 1	·	420 m	MPC · JPL
844831	2017 KB_{38}	—	May 31, 2017	Haleakala	Pan-STARRS 1	PHO	730 m	MPC · JPL
844832	2017 KN_{38}	—	July 12, 2010	WISE	WISE	·	2.4 km	MPC · JPL
844833	2017 KW_{38}	—	May 21, 2017	Haleakala	Pan-STARRS 1	·	1.1 km	MPC · JPL
844834	2017 KO_{39}	—	May 29, 2017	Mount Lemmon	Mount Lemmon Survey	·	2.2 km	MPC · JPL
844835	2017 KU_{46}	—	March 31, 2013	Mount Lemmon	Mount Lemmon Survey	·	750 m	MPC · JPL
844836	2017 KR_{48}	—	May 31, 2017	Haleakala	Pan-STARRS 1	·	2.6 km	MPC · JPL
844837	2017 LB	—	May 6, 2017	Haleakala	Pan-STARRS 1	H	460 m	MPC · JPL
844838	2017 LO_{1}	—	June 14, 2017	Mount Lemmon	Mount Lemmon Survey	·	1.5 km	MPC · JPL
844839	2017 LZ_{3}	—	June 2, 2017	Cerro Tololo	M. Micheli, F. Valdes	·	790 m	MPC · JPL
844840	2017 MV	—	November 13, 2010	Kitt Peak	Spacewatch	·	960 m	MPC · JPL
844841	2017 ML_{4}	—	June 23, 2017	Haleakala	Pan-STARRS 1	H	420 m	MPC · JPL
844842	2017 MG_{6}	—	January 18, 2016	Haleakala	Pan-STARRS 1	MAR	610 m	MPC · JPL
844843	2017 MQ_{14}	—	July 29, 2010	WISE	WISE	·	1.0 km	MPC · JPL
844844	2017 MG_{15}	—	June 25, 2017	Haleakala	Pan-STARRS 1	·	440 m	MPC · JPL
844845	2017 MM_{19}	—	June 22, 2017	Haleakala	Pan-STARRS 1	EOS	1.4 km	MPC · JPL
844846	2017 MC_{22}	—	June 23, 2017	Haleakala	Pan-STARRS 1	·	1.4 km	MPC · JPL
844847	2017 MC_{23}	—	June 25, 2017	Haleakala	Pan-STARRS 1	V	530 m	MPC · JPL
844848	2017 ML_{23}	—	May 1, 2016	Cerro Tololo	DECam	·	810 m	MPC · JPL
844849	2017 ND_{7}	—	July 15, 2017	Haleakala	Pan-STARRS 1	T_{j} (2.95)	2.6 km	MPC · JPL
844850	2017 NE_{12}	—	July 1, 2017	Haleakala	Pan-STARRS 1	H	390 m	MPC · JPL
844851	2017 NE_{13}	—	October 9, 2012	Haleakala	Pan-STARRS 1	·	2.0 km	MPC · JPL
844852	2017 NF_{13}	—	April 30, 2016	Haleakala	Pan-STARRS 1	·	1.3 km	MPC · JPL
844853	2017 NZ_{15}	—	March 28, 2016	Cerro Tololo	DECam	·	690 m	MPC · JPL
844854	2017 NN_{17}	—	July 4, 2017	Haleakala	Pan-STARRS 1	EOS	1.4 km	MPC · JPL
844855	2017 NP_{17}	—	July 4, 2017	Haleakala	Pan-STARRS 1	·	690 m	MPC · JPL
844856	2017 NK_{22}	—	July 5, 2017	Haleakala	Pan-STARRS 1	NYS	730 m	MPC · JPL
844857	2017 NH_{24}	—	July 5, 2017	Haleakala	Pan-STARRS 1	(5)	740 m	MPC · JPL
844858	2017 OL_{3}	—	July 4, 2017	Haleakala	Pan-STARRS 1	·	2.3 km	MPC · JPL
844859	2017 OQ_{4}	—	July 30, 2010	WISE	WISE	T_{j} (2.88)	4.7 km	MPC · JPL
844860	2017 OR_{6}	—	October 30, 2010	Mount Lemmon	Mount Lemmon Survey	T_{j} (2.93)	3.5 km	MPC · JPL
844861	2017 OX_{7}	—	December 5, 2007	Kitt Peak	Spacewatch	·	1.1 km	MPC · JPL
844862	2017 OC_{9}	—	August 6, 2010	WISE	WISE	T_{j} (2.95) · 3:2	4.8 km	MPC · JPL
844863	2017 OU_{11}	—	January 31, 2008	Mount Lemmon	Mount Lemmon Survey	·	830 m	MPC · JPL
844864	2017 OT_{12}	—	January 12, 2016	Haleakala	Pan-STARRS 1	(895)	3.1 km	MPC · JPL
844865	2017 OG_{13}	—	June 9, 2010	WISE	WISE	(69559)	2.9 km	MPC · JPL
844866	2017 OT_{15}	—	June 24, 2017	Haleakala	Pan-STARRS 1	·	1.0 km	MPC · JPL
844867	2017 OQ_{21}	—	January 1, 2009	Mount Lemmon	Mount Lemmon Survey	·	4.6 km	MPC · JPL
844868	2017 OS_{23}	—	January 10, 2014	Mount Lemmon	Mount Lemmon Survey	·	2.2 km	MPC · JPL
844869	2017 OH_{26}	—	April 12, 2016	Haleakala	Pan-STARRS 1	LIX	2.6 km	MPC · JPL
844870	2017 OB_{30}	—	November 28, 2002	Kitt Peak	Deep Lens Survey	EOS	2.0 km	MPC · JPL
844871	2017 OO_{33}	—	August 6, 2013	Piszkéstető	K. Sárneczky	·	750 m	MPC · JPL
844872	2017 OC_{38}	—	September 27, 2009	Kitt Peak	Spacewatch	·	600 m	MPC · JPL
844873	2017 OS_{39}	—	September 22, 2012	Mount Lemmon	Mount Lemmon Survey	·	1.3 km	MPC · JPL
844874	2017 OS_{41}	—	February 1, 2008	Kitt Peak	Spacewatch	H	430 m	MPC · JPL
844875	2017 ON_{48}	—	February 18, 2010	Kitt Peak	Spacewatch	AEG	2.6 km	MPC · JPL
844876	2017 OA_{49}	—	July 10, 2010	WISE	WISE	·	1.4 km	MPC · JPL
844877	2017 OR_{50}	—	June 3, 2016	Haleakala	Pan-STARRS 1	·	2.0 km	MPC · JPL
844878	2017 OK_{55}	—	January 30, 2016	Haleakala	Pan-STARRS 1	H	410 m	MPC · JPL
844879	2017 ON_{55}	—	July 30, 2017	Haleakala	Pan-STARRS 1	·	910 m	MPC · JPL
844880	2017 OT_{56}	—	July 22, 2017	Haleakala	Pan-STARRS 1	·	1.1 km	MPC · JPL
844881	2017 OP_{63}	—	July 30, 2017	Haleakala	Pan-STARRS 1	·	1.3 km	MPC · JPL
844882	2017 OF_{65}	—	July 30, 2017	Haleakala	Pan-STARRS 1	·	1.0 km	MPC · JPL
844883	2017 OM_{66}	—	July 30, 2017	Haleakala	Pan-STARRS 1	·	700 m	MPC · JPL
844884	2017 OV_{70}	—	July 30, 2017	Haleakala	Pan-STARRS 1	·	640 m	MPC · JPL
844885	2017 OW_{70}	—	July 30, 2017	Haleakala	Pan-STARRS 1	·	810 m	MPC · JPL
844886	2017 OQ_{71}	—	July 30, 2017	Haleakala	Pan-STARRS 1	(5)	750 m	MPC · JPL
844887	2017 OE_{72}	—	July 30, 2017	Haleakala	Pan-STARRS 1	EUN	710 m	MPC · JPL
844888	2017 OV_{72}	—	July 30, 2017	Haleakala	Pan-STARRS 1	EUN	730 m	MPC · JPL
844889	2017 OW_{72}	—	July 30, 2017	Haleakala	Pan-STARRS 1	(5)	600 m	MPC · JPL
844890	2017 OH_{73}	—	July 27, 2017	Haleakala	Pan-STARRS 1	·	400 m	MPC · JPL
844891	2017 OU_{74}	—	July 30, 2017	Haleakala	Pan-STARRS 1	·	410 m	MPC · JPL
844892	2017 ON_{79}	—	May 18, 2010	WISE	WISE	·	1.8 km	MPC · JPL
844893	2017 OE_{80}	—	July 26, 2017	Haleakala	Pan-STARRS 1	MAR	550 m	MPC · JPL
844894	2017 OH_{81}	—	July 25, 2017	Haleakala	Pan-STARRS 1	T_{j} (2.99) · 3:2	4.0 km	MPC · JPL
844895	2017 OF_{83}	—	July 30, 2017	Haleakala	Pan-STARRS 1	EUN	850 m	MPC · JPL
844896	2017 OG_{83}	—	July 25, 2017	Haleakala	Pan-STARRS 1	·	800 m	MPC · JPL
844897	2017 OJ_{88}	—	July 27, 2017	Haleakala	Pan-STARRS 1	EOS	1.3 km	MPC · JPL
844898	2017 OE_{89}	—	July 30, 2017	Haleakala	Pan-STARRS 1	·	470 m	MPC · JPL
844899	2017 OH_{89}	—	July 30, 2017	Haleakala	Pan-STARRS 1	V	430 m	MPC · JPL
844900	2017 OV_{89}	—	July 30, 2017	Haleakala	Pan-STARRS 1	·	980 m	MPC · JPL

== 844901–845000 ==
back to top

Designation			Discovery			Properties		Ref
Permanent	Provisional	Named after	Date	Site	Discoverer(s)	Category	Diam.	Ref
844901	2017 OU_{92}	—	July 26, 2017	Haleakala	Pan-STARRS 1	·	1.6 km	MPC · JPL
844902	2017 OB_{93}	—	July 25, 2017	Haleakala	Pan-STARRS 1	·	460 m	MPC · JPL
844903	2017 OL_{94}	—	July 25, 2017	Haleakala	Pan-STARRS 1	·	470 m	MPC · JPL
844904	2017 OV_{94}	—	July 27, 2017	Haleakala	Pan-STARRS 1	3:2	4.5 km	MPC · JPL
844905	2017 OW_{102}	—	July 27, 2017	Haleakala	Pan-STARRS 1	·	850 m	MPC · JPL
844906	2017 OS_{104}	—	July 30, 2017	Haleakala	Pan-STARRS 1	EUN	780 m	MPC · JPL
844907	2017 OR_{105}	—	January 20, 2015	Haleakala	Pan-STARRS 1	EOS	1.3 km	MPC · JPL
844908	2017 OW_{107}	—	July 26, 2017	Haleakala	Pan-STARRS 1	·	1.3 km	MPC · JPL
844909	2017 OP_{108}	—	July 25, 2017	Haleakala	Pan-STARRS 1	·	1.3 km	MPC · JPL
844910	2017 OV_{115}	—	July 25, 2017	Haleakala	Pan-STARRS 1	·	1.1 km	MPC · JPL
844911	2017 OD_{121}	—	July 25, 2017	Haleakala	Pan-STARRS 1	·	680 m	MPC · JPL
844912	2017 OP_{123}	—	July 27, 2017	Haleakala	Pan-STARRS 1	BRG	1.1 km	MPC · JPL
844913	2017 OV_{123}	—	July 26, 2017	Haleakala	Pan-STARRS 1	·	790 m	MPC · JPL
844914	2017 OT_{124}	—	May 3, 2016	Cerro Tololo	DECam	·	620 m	MPC · JPL
844915	2017 OZ_{124}	—	July 30, 2017	Haleakala	Pan-STARRS 1	EUN	680 m	MPC · JPL
844916	2017 OZ_{125}	—	July 29, 2017	Haleakala	Pan-STARRS 1	·	730 m	MPC · JPL
844917	2017 OH_{126}	—	September 27, 2013	Haleakala	Pan-STARRS 1	·	590 m	MPC · JPL
844918	2017 OD_{127}	—	March 28, 2016	Cerro Tololo	DECam	·	710 m	MPC · JPL
844919	2017 OG_{127}	—	July 27, 2017	Haleakala	Pan-STARRS 1	·	820 m	MPC · JPL
844920	2017 OP_{131}	—	July 25, 2017	Haleakala	Pan-STARRS 1	·	870 m	MPC · JPL
844921	2017 OY_{132}	—	July 27, 2017	Haleakala	Pan-STARRS 1	·	1.3 km	MPC · JPL
844922	2017 OB_{138}	—	July 30, 2017	Haleakala	Pan-STARRS 1	·	560 m	MPC · JPL
844923	2017 OE_{144}	—	July 26, 2017	Haleakala	Pan-STARRS 1	·	1.4 km	MPC · JPL
844924	2017 OH_{145}	—	July 26, 2017	Haleakala	Pan-STARRS 1	·	890 m	MPC · JPL
844925	2017 OX_{145}	—	July 25, 2017	Haleakala	Pan-STARRS 1	·	1.4 km	MPC · JPL
844926	2017 OV_{154}	—	July 30, 2017	Haleakala	Pan-STARRS 1	EUN	690 m	MPC · JPL
844927	2017 OM_{201}	—	July 25, 2017	Haleakala	Pan-STARRS 1	·	1.2 km	MPC · JPL
844928	2017 PO_{2}	—	August 1, 2017	Haleakala	Pan-STARRS 1	MAR	610 m	MPC · JPL
844929	2017 PS_{2}	—	August 1, 2017	Haleakala	Pan-STARRS 1	·	930 m	MPC · JPL
844930	2017 PU_{2}	—	August 1, 2017	Haleakala	Pan-STARRS 1	·	1.2 km	MPC · JPL
844931	2017 PH_{4}	—	July 1, 2013	Haleakala	Pan-STARRS 1	·	720 m	MPC · JPL
844932	2017 PN_{6}	—	May 3, 2016	Cerro Tololo	DECam	·	1.2 km	MPC · JPL
844933	2017 PY_{10}	—	May 24, 2010	WISE	WISE	·	2.8 km	MPC · JPL
844934	2017 PT_{12}	—	March 13, 2012	Mount Lemmon	Mount Lemmon Survey	·	670 m	MPC · JPL
844935	2017 PL_{19}	—	August 1, 2017	Haleakala	Pan-STARRS 1	·	820 m	MPC · JPL
844936	2017 PZ_{19}	—	March 4, 2016	Haleakala	Pan-STARRS 1	·	990 m	MPC · JPL
844937	2017 PB_{21}	—	July 7, 2010	WISE	WISE	·	2.9 km	MPC · JPL
844938	2017 PQ_{22}	—	October 26, 2013	Catalina	CSS	ADE	1.7 km	MPC · JPL
844939	2017 PS_{23}	—	April 13, 2013	Haleakala	Pan-STARRS 1	·	510 m	MPC · JPL
844940	2017 PY_{31}	—	July 31, 2010	WISE	WISE	T_{j} (2.98)	3.1 km	MPC · JPL
844941	2017 PE_{33}	—	February 28, 2009	Mount Lemmon	Mount Lemmon Survey	NYS	770 m	MPC · JPL
844942	2017 PJ_{34}	—	February 15, 2013	Haleakala	Pan-STARRS 1	·	520 m	MPC · JPL
844943	2017 PP_{36}	—	July 5, 2017	Haleakala	Pan-STARRS 1	·	800 m	MPC · JPL
844944	2017 PT_{39}	—	August 15, 2017	Haleakala	Pan-STARRS 1	·	910 m	MPC · JPL
844945	2017 PT_{40}	—	June 29, 2017	Mount Lemmon	Mount Lemmon Survey	·	1.3 km	MPC · JPL
844946	2017 PH_{41}	—	September 15, 2012	Mount Lemmon	Mount Lemmon Survey	·	2.1 km	MPC · JPL
844947	2017 PN_{42}	—	November 29, 2013	Mount Lemmon	Mount Lemmon Survey	·	1.1 km	MPC · JPL
844948	2017 PP_{42}	—	August 3, 2017	Haleakala	Pan-STARRS 1	·	780 m	MPC · JPL
844949	2017 PV_{42}	—	August 3, 2017	Haleakala	Pan-STARRS 1	·	910 m	MPC · JPL
844950	2017 PW_{42}	—	August 1, 2017	Haleakala	Pan-STARRS 1	·	590 m	MPC · JPL
844951	2017 PR_{43}	—	August 3, 2017	Haleakala	Pan-STARRS 1	·	520 m	MPC · JPL
844952	2017 PR_{44}	—	August 3, 2017	Haleakala	Pan-STARRS 1	·	910 m	MPC · JPL
844953	2017 PT_{46}	—	August 3, 2017	Haleakala	Pan-STARRS 1	(5)	740 m	MPC · JPL
844954	2017 PB_{47}	—	August 3, 2017	Haleakala	Pan-STARRS 1	·	1.2 km	MPC · JPL
844955	2017 PJ_{47}	—	August 4, 2017	Haleakala	Pan-STARRS 1	·	980 m	MPC · JPL
844956	2017 PE_{48}	—	August 3, 2017	Haleakala	Pan-STARRS 1	·	1.3 km	MPC · JPL
844957	2017 PG_{48}	—	August 3, 2017	Haleakala	Pan-STARRS 1	·	860 m	MPC · JPL
844958	2017 PH_{48}	—	August 1, 2017	Haleakala	Pan-STARRS 1	EUN	850 m	MPC · JPL
844959	2017 PD_{49}	—	August 3, 2017	Haleakala	Pan-STARRS 1	·	1.2 km	MPC · JPL
844960	2017 PO_{50}	—	January 31, 2006	Kitt Peak	Spacewatch	EUN	910 m	MPC · JPL
844961	2017 PE_{52}	—	August 15, 2017	Haleakala	Pan-STARRS 1	PHO	990 m	MPC · JPL
844962	2017 PA_{54}	—	August 15, 2017	Haleakala	Pan-STARRS 1	·	1.2 km	MPC · JPL
844963	2017 PF_{54}	—	August 4, 2017	Haleakala	Pan-STARRS 1	·	950 m	MPC · JPL
844964	2017 PF_{59}	—	August 1, 2017	Haleakala	Pan-STARRS 1	·	890 m	MPC · JPL
844965	2017 PA_{61}	—	August 1, 2017	Haleakala	Pan-STARRS 1	·	2.1 km	MPC · JPL
844966	2017 PC_{64}	—	August 15, 2017	Haleakala	Pan-STARRS 1	EUN	880 m	MPC · JPL
844967	2017 PW_{64}	—	October 3, 2013	Catalina	CSS	JUN	730 m	MPC · JPL
844968	2017 PU_{65}	—	August 1, 2017	Haleakala	Pan-STARRS 1	·	920 m	MPC · JPL
844969	2017 PC_{66}	—	March 1, 2016	Mount Lemmon	Mount Lemmon Survey	·	630 m	MPC · JPL
844970	2017 PU_{66}	—	August 14, 2017	Haleakala	Pan-STARRS 1	·	1.4 km	MPC · JPL
844971	2017 PR_{67}	—	August 14, 2017	Haleakala	Pan-STARRS 1	·	920 m	MPC · JPL
844972	2017 QC_{1}	—	September 12, 1994	Kitt Peak	Spacewatch	·	850 m	MPC · JPL
844973	2017 QO_{3}	—	January 18, 2016	Haleakala	Pan-STARRS 1	EUN	960 m	MPC · JPL
844974	2017 QH_{10}	—	September 17, 2010	Mount Lemmon	Mount Lemmon Survey	3:2	4.0 km	MPC · JPL
844975	2017 QJ_{11}	—	April 19, 2015	Cerro Tololo	DECam	T_{j} (2.98) · 3:2 · (6124)	3.9 km	MPC · JPL
844976	2017 QS_{14}	—	February 12, 2016	Kitt Peak	Spacewatch	MAS	490 m	MPC · JPL
844977	2017 QJ_{21}	—	June 2, 2017	Cerro Tololo	M. Micheli, F. Valdes	·	480 m	MPC · JPL
844978	2017 QO_{22}	—	February 14, 2012	Haleakala	Pan-STARRS 1	·	670 m	MPC · JPL
844979	2017 QH_{24}	—	August 19, 2006	Kitt Peak	Spacewatch	·	880 m	MPC · JPL
844980	2017 QE_{25}	—	August 22, 2017	Haleakala	Pan-STARRS 1	·	890 m	MPC · JPL
844981	2017 QZ_{26}	—	March 31, 2016	Cerro Tololo	DECam	·	1.1 km	MPC · JPL
844982	2017 QX_{27}	—	December 2, 2008	Kitt Peak	Spacewatch	·	1.5 km	MPC · JPL
844983	2017 QJ_{30}	—	February 7, 2011	Mount Lemmon	Mount Lemmon Survey	HNS	580 m	MPC · JPL
844984	2017 QM_{41}	—	September 17, 2006	Kitt Peak	Spacewatch	·	950 m	MPC · JPL
844985	2017 QA_{44}	—	August 12, 2013	Haleakala	Pan-STARRS 1	·	580 m	MPC · JPL
844986	2017 QF_{47}	—	July 15, 2010	WISE	WISE	·	2.1 km	MPC · JPL
844987	2017 QD_{52}	—	August 15, 2013	Haleakala	Pan-STARRS 1	·	700 m	MPC · JPL
844988	2017 QA_{53}	—	August 17, 2017	Haleakala	Pan-STARRS 1	·	520 m	MPC · JPL
844989	2017 QN_{57}	—	October 30, 2002	Sacramento Peak	SDSS	·	900 m	MPC · JPL
844990	2017 QG_{60}	—	August 15, 2009	Kitt Peak	Spacewatch	3:2	4.3 km	MPC · JPL
844991	2017 QG_{62}	—	May 12, 2013	Mount Lemmon	Mount Lemmon Survey	V	330 m	MPC · JPL
844992	2017 QU_{65}	—	July 27, 2017	Haleakala	Pan-STARRS 1	·	700 m	MPC · JPL
844993	2017 QZ_{65}	—	July 26, 2017	Haleakala	Pan-STARRS 1	EOS	1.4 km	MPC · JPL
844994	2017 QE_{68}	—	August 31, 2017	Mount Lemmon	Mount Lemmon Survey	EUP	2.2 km	MPC · JPL
844995	2017 QO_{68}	—	January 13, 2016	Mount Lemmon	Mount Lemmon Survey	H	330 m	MPC · JPL
844996	2017 QE_{73}	—	August 31, 2017	Haleakala	Pan-STARRS 1	·	810 m	MPC · JPL
844997	2017 QR_{74}	—	August 20, 2017	Haleakala	Pan-STARRS 1	EUN	720 m	MPC · JPL
844998	2017 QH_{75}	—	August 31, 2017	Haleakala	Pan-STARRS 1	·	1.3 km	MPC · JPL
844999	2017 QJ_{76}	—	August 24, 2017	Haleakala	Pan-STARRS 1	·	1.1 km	MPC · JPL
845000	2017 QX_{79}	—	August 31, 2017	Mount Lemmon	Mount Lemmon Survey	·	780 m	MPC · JPL

back to top
