= List of minor planets: 602001–603000 =

The following is a partial list of minor planets, running from minor-planet number 602001 through 603000, inclusive. The primary data for this and other partial lists is based on JPL's "Small-Body Orbital Elements" and data available from the Minor Planet Center. Critical list information is also provided by the MPC, unless otherwise specified from Lowell Observatory. A detailed description of the table's columns and additional sources are given on the main page including a complete list of every page in this series, and a statistical break-up on the dynamical classification of minor planets.

Also see the summary list of all named bodies in numerical and alphabetical order, and the corresponding naming citations for the number range of this particular list. New namings may only be added to this list after official publication, as the preannouncement of names is condemned by the Working Group for Small Bodies Nomenclature of the International Astronomical Union.

Near-Earth obj.	MBA (inner)	MBA (outer)	Centaur
Mars-crosser	MBA (middle)	Jupiter trojan	Trans-Neptunian obj.
Unclassified

== 602001–602100 ==
Designation			Discovery			Properties		Ref
Permanent	Provisional	Named after	Date	Site	Discoverer(s)	Category	Diam.	Ref
602001	2014 AS_{46}	—	December 27, 2013	Piszkéstető	K. Sárneczky	·	2.2 km	MPC · JPL
602002	2014 AY_{46}	—	October 24, 2005	Mauna Kea	A. Boattini	·	870 m	MPC · JPL
602003	2014 AF_{50}	—	January 9, 2014	Haleakala	Pan-STARRS 1	·	1.9 km	MPC · JPL
602004	2014 AK_{53}	—	December 25, 2013	Catalina	CSS	·	1.6 km	MPC · JPL
602005	2014 AW_{53}	—	December 25, 2013	Kitt Peak	Spacewatch	(5)	940 m	MPC · JPL
602006	2014 AM_{56}	—	January 2, 2014	Kitt Peak	Spacewatch	·	2.1 km	MPC · JPL
602007	2014 AX_{58}	—	January 2, 2014	Kitt Peak	Spacewatch	·	1.7 km	MPC · JPL
602008	2014 AT_{59}	—	February 18, 2001	Haleakala	NEAT	·	1.8 km	MPC · JPL
602009	2014 AE_{60}	—	January 12, 2014	Mount Lemmon	Mount Lemmon Survey	·	1.3 km	MPC · JPL
602010	2014 AJ_{61}	—	January 2, 2014	Kitt Peak	Spacewatch	·	1.1 km	MPC · JPL
602011	2014 AV_{61}	—	January 2, 2014	Catalina	CSS	PHO	1.0 km	MPC · JPL
602012	2014 AM_{68}	—	January 7, 2014	Mount Lemmon	Mount Lemmon Survey	·	1.8 km	MPC · JPL
602013	2014 AC_{70}	—	January 12, 2014	Mount Lemmon	Mount Lemmon Survey	·	1.2 km	MPC · JPL
602014	2014 BN_{3}	—	December 2, 2013	Oukaïmeden	M. Ory	HNS	1.1 km	MPC · JPL
602015	2014 BJ_{6}	—	December 31, 2013	Kitt Peak	Spacewatch	·	1.1 km	MPC · JPL
602016	2014 BX_{8}	—	January 21, 2014	Haleakala	Pan-STARRS 1	H	400 m	MPC · JPL
602017	2014 BE_{14}	—	December 11, 2013	Mount Lemmon	Mount Lemmon Survey	·	1.7 km	MPC · JPL
602018	2014 BV_{14}	—	February 4, 2009	Kitt Peak	Spacewatch	·	2.2 km	MPC · JPL
602019	2014 BZ_{15}	—	December 13, 2013	Mount Lemmon	Mount Lemmon Survey	EUN	990 m	MPC · JPL
602020	2014 BM_{19}	—	September 12, 2002	Palomar	NEAT	·	460 m	MPC · JPL
602021	2014 BJ_{20}	—	November 18, 2008	Kitt Peak	Spacewatch	·	1.3 km	MPC · JPL
602022	2014 BO_{24}	—	September 24, 2008	Kitt Peak	Spacewatch	·	1.1 km	MPC · JPL
602023	2014 BA_{26}	—	December 26, 2013	Mount Lemmon	Mount Lemmon Survey	EUN	1.1 km	MPC · JPL
602024	2014 BV_{33}	—	December 20, 2004	Mount Lemmon	Mount Lemmon Survey	·	1.8 km	MPC · JPL
602025	2014 BJ_{38}	—	January 23, 2014	Mount Lemmon	Mount Lemmon Survey	·	1.6 km	MPC · JPL
602026	2014 BE_{40}	—	January 24, 2014	Haleakala	Pan-STARRS 1	THB	2.1 km	MPC · JPL
602027	2014 BJ_{41}	—	September 20, 2011	Haleakala	Pan-STARRS 1	·	2.8 km	MPC · JPL
602028	2014 BB_{45}	—	January 1, 2014	Haleakala	Pan-STARRS 1	·	1.4 km	MPC · JPL
602029	2014 BG_{48}	—	January 23, 2014	Mount Lemmon	Mount Lemmon Survey	·	1.6 km	MPC · JPL
602030	2014 BN_{49}	—	February 1, 2009	Catalina	CSS	·	2.8 km	MPC · JPL
602031	2014 BD_{54}	—	February 1, 2009	Kitt Peak	Spacewatch	H	320 m	MPC · JPL
602032	2014 BR_{55}	—	January 1, 2014	Nogales	M. Schwartz, P. R. Holvorcem	·	910 m	MPC · JPL
602033	2014 BM_{59}	—	January 29, 2014	Kitt Peak	Spacewatch	·	1.8 km	MPC · JPL
602034	2014 BW_{60}	—	September 27, 2008	Mount Lemmon	Mount Lemmon Survey	·	1.8 km	MPC · JPL
602035	2014 BU_{65}	—	August 23, 2003	Palomar	NEAT	MAR	1.2 km	MPC · JPL
602036	2014 BF_{66}	—	January 29, 2014	Kitt Peak	Spacewatch	·	2.8 km	MPC · JPL
602037	2014 BJ_{68}	—	March 3, 2006	Kitt Peak	Spacewatch	EUN	930 m	MPC · JPL
602038	2014 BA_{69}	—	October 19, 2012	Haleakala	Pan-STARRS 1	·	2.2 km	MPC · JPL
602039	2014 BZ_{69}	—	October 9, 1996	Kitt Peak	Spacewatch	·	1.2 km	MPC · JPL
602040	2014 BO_{70}	—	November 1, 2013	Mount Lemmon	Mount Lemmon Survey	EUN	820 m	MPC · JPL
602041	2014 BF_{71}	—	January 29, 2014	Catalina	CSS	EUN	810 m	MPC · JPL
602042	2014 BQ_{71}	—	January 26, 2014	Haleakala	Pan-STARRS 1	HNS	880 m	MPC · JPL
602043	2014 BZ_{71}	—	January 31, 2014	Haleakala	Pan-STARRS 1	·	1.8 km	MPC · JPL
602044	2014 BH_{72}	—	January 31, 2014	Haleakala	Pan-STARRS 1	·	1.5 km	MPC · JPL
602045	2014 BY_{73}	—	December 23, 2017	Haleakala	Pan-STARRS 1	MAR	680 m	MPC · JPL
602046	2014 BG_{79}	—	January 28, 2014	Kitt Peak	Spacewatch	·	1.7 km	MPC · JPL
602047	2014 BN_{84}	—	January 23, 2014	Mount Lemmon	Mount Lemmon Survey	TIR	1.9 km	MPC · JPL
602048	2014 CV_{1}	—	February 4, 2014	Elena Remote	Oreshko, A.	HNS	1.1 km	MPC · JPL
602049	2014 CC_{6}	—	October 1, 2003	Kitt Peak	Spacewatch	·	1.7 km	MPC · JPL
602050	2014 CY_{7}	—	January 9, 2014	Mount Lemmon	Mount Lemmon Survey	·	1.6 km	MPC · JPL
602051	2014 CM_{8}	—	October 18, 2012	Haleakala	Pan-STARRS 1	·	1.6 km	MPC · JPL
602052	2014 CZ_{10}	—	August 18, 2012	Charleston	R. Holmes	·	1.8 km	MPC · JPL
602053	2014 CB_{14}	—	February 10, 2014	Mount Lemmon	Mount Lemmon Survey	H	560 m	MPC · JPL
602054	2014 CB_{15}	—	February 10, 2014	Haleakala	Pan-STARRS 1	·	1.5 km	MPC · JPL
602055	2014 CT_{22}	—	March 11, 2003	Palomar	NEAT	H	590 m	MPC · JPL
602056	2014 CA_{25}	—	December 28, 2002	Kitt Peak	Spacewatch	·	2.4 km	MPC · JPL
602057	2014 CF_{25}	—	February 6, 2014	Oukaïmeden	C. Rinner	·	2.4 km	MPC · JPL
602058	2014 CH_{25}	—	July 17, 2004	Cerro Tololo	Deep Ecliptic Survey	NYS	860 m	MPC · JPL
602059	2014 CS_{26}	—	February 2, 2005	Kitt Peak	Spacewatch	·	1.9 km	MPC · JPL
602060	2014 CW_{27}	—	February 10, 2014	Haleakala	Pan-STARRS 1	·	1.8 km	MPC · JPL
602061	2014 CY_{27}	—	February 10, 2014	Haleakala	Pan-STARRS 1	·	1.3 km	MPC · JPL
602062	2014 CE_{30}	—	February 1, 2014	ESA OGS	ESA OGS	·	1.2 km	MPC · JPL
602063	2014 CP_{30}	—	February 9, 2014	Kitt Peak	Spacewatch	·	1.3 km	MPC · JPL
602064	2014 CD_{32}	—	February 6, 2014	Mount Lemmon	Mount Lemmon Survey	·	1.5 km	MPC · JPL
602065	2014 CE_{32}	—	February 9, 2005	Mount Lemmon	Mount Lemmon Survey	·	1.4 km	MPC · JPL
602066	2014 CN_{32}	—	February 5, 2014	Mount Lemmon	Mount Lemmon Survey	HNS	910 m	MPC · JPL
602067	2014 CV_{32}	—	February 4, 2014	Catalina	CSS	·	2.2 km	MPC · JPL
602068	2014 DB_{2}	—	February 19, 2014	Kitt Peak	Spacewatch	·	1.5 km	MPC · JPL
602069	2014 DQ_{6}	—	February 6, 2014	Catalina	CSS	H	470 m	MPC · JPL
602070	2014 DA_{11}	—	January 29, 2014	Mount Lemmon	Mount Lemmon Survey	H	550 m	MPC · JPL
602071	2014 DN_{13}	—	December 5, 2007	Catalina	CSS	·	2.6 km	MPC · JPL
602072	2014 DK_{17}	—	March 13, 2005	Kitt Peak	Spacewatch	·	2.0 km	MPC · JPL
602073	2014 DE_{18}	—	January 29, 2014	Oukaïmeden	M. Ory	·	2.7 km	MPC · JPL
602074	2014 DH_{22}	—	March 11, 2003	Palomar	NEAT	·	1.1 km	MPC · JPL
602075	2014 DP_{23}	—	February 20, 2014	Kitt Peak	Spacewatch	HNS	940 m	MPC · JPL
602076	2014 DM_{27}	—	January 25, 2014	Haleakala	Pan-STARRS 1	·	1.5 km	MPC · JPL
602077	2014 DC_{33}	—	September 19, 1998	Apache Point	SDSS Collaboration	·	1.8 km	MPC · JPL
602078	2014 DQ_{35}	—	February 22, 2014	Kitt Peak	Spacewatch	ADE	1.6 km	MPC · JPL
602079	2014 DH_{39}	—	December 25, 2013	Mount Lemmon	Mount Lemmon Survey	·	1.4 km	MPC · JPL
602080	2014 DA_{41}	—	September 28, 2003	Apache Point	SDSS Collaboration	·	1.5 km	MPC · JPL
602081	2014 DB_{42}	—	October 15, 2012	Haleakala	Pan-STARRS 1	·	700 m	MPC · JPL
602082	2014 DD_{43}	—	February 26, 2014	Oukaïmeden	M. Ory	·	3.3 km	MPC · JPL
602083	2014 DU_{44}	—	December 18, 2007	Mount Lemmon	Mount Lemmon Survey	·	2.7 km	MPC · JPL
602084	2014 DJ_{46}	—	January 28, 2014	Kitt Peak	Spacewatch	·	1.8 km	MPC · JPL
602085	2014 DL_{46}	—	April 28, 2007	Kitt Peak	Spacewatch	·	1.5 km	MPC · JPL
602086	2014 DO_{47}	—	February 27, 2014	Kitt Peak	Spacewatch	·	2.0 km	MPC · JPL
602087	2014 DA_{50}	—	August 19, 2001	Cerro Tololo	Deep Ecliptic Survey	KOR	1.2 km	MPC · JPL
602088	2014 DB_{50}	—	January 10, 2013	Haleakala	Pan-STARRS 1	L4	9.6 km	MPC · JPL
602089	2014 DH_{50}	—	February 7, 2008	Kitt Peak	Spacewatch	·	2.3 km	MPC · JPL
602090	2014 DJ_{50}	—	January 6, 2013	Kitt Peak	Spacewatch	L4	6.1 km	MPC · JPL
602091	2014 DJ_{53}	—	October 21, 2012	Mount Lemmon	Mount Lemmon Survey	·	1.2 km	MPC · JPL
602092	2014 DZ_{53}	—	February 8, 2013	Haleakala	Pan-STARRS 1	L4	6.7 km	MPC · JPL
602093	2014 DG_{54}	—	February 26, 2014	Haleakala	Pan-STARRS 1	(194)	1.1 km	MPC · JPL
602094	2014 DN_{55}	—	October 26, 2012	Mount Lemmon	Mount Lemmon Survey	·	1.6 km	MPC · JPL
602095	2014 DL_{58}	—	February 4, 2009	Mount Lemmon	Mount Lemmon Survey	·	1.5 km	MPC · JPL
602096	2014 DM_{58}	—	February 26, 2014	Haleakala	Pan-STARRS 1	·	1.3 km	MPC · JPL
602097	2014 DR_{59}	—	October 11, 2012	Haleakala	Pan-STARRS 1	·	1.3 km	MPC · JPL
602098	2014 DT_{60}	—	October 15, 2007	Kitt Peak	Spacewatch	·	1.5 km	MPC · JPL
602099	2014 DT_{61}	—	September 11, 2007	Mount Lemmon	Mount Lemmon Survey	·	1.6 km	MPC · JPL
602100	2014 DX_{62}	—	March 2, 2009	Mount Lemmon	Mount Lemmon Survey	H	500 m	MPC · JPL

== 602101–602200 ==
back to top

Designation			Discovery			Properties		Ref
Permanent	Provisional	Named after	Date	Site	Discoverer(s)	Category	Diam.	Ref
602101	2014 DE_{63}	—	November 13, 2007	Mount Lemmon	Mount Lemmon Survey	·	1.8 km	MPC · JPL
602102	2014 DD_{65}	—	February 26, 2014	Haleakala	Pan-STARRS 1	MRX	900 m	MPC · JPL
602103	2014 DM_{74}	—	September 12, 2007	Catalina	CSS	·	1.9 km	MPC · JPL
602104	2014 DS_{74}	—	February 2, 2008	Kitt Peak	Spacewatch	LIX	2.4 km	MPC · JPL
602105	2014 DW_{75}	—	February 26, 2014	Haleakala	Pan-STARRS 1	·	2.0 km	MPC · JPL
602106	2014 DP_{76}	—	August 19, 2006	Kitt Peak	Spacewatch	KOR	1.3 km	MPC · JPL
602107	2014 DC_{78}	—	February 20, 2009	Kitt Peak	Spacewatch	·	1.6 km	MPC · JPL
602108	2014 DF_{79}	—	April 12, 2005	Kitt Peak	Deep Ecliptic Survey	MRX	940 m	MPC · JPL
602109	2014 DM_{79}	—	April 5, 2003	Kitt Peak	Spacewatch	·	2.4 km	MPC · JPL
602110	2014 DM_{80}	—	April 25, 2004	Apache Point	SDSS Collaboration	H	530 m	MPC · JPL
602111	2014 DS_{81}	—	September 4, 2007	Mount Lemmon	Mount Lemmon Survey	·	1.7 km	MPC · JPL
602112	2014 DW_{81}	—	September 20, 2011	Mount Lemmon	Mount Lemmon Survey	EOS	1.9 km	MPC · JPL
602113	2014 DN_{83}	—	January 10, 2013	Haleakala	Pan-STARRS 1	L4	7.2 km	MPC · JPL
602114	2014 DT_{89}	—	February 22, 2009	Kitt Peak	Spacewatch	·	1.3 km	MPC · JPL
602115	2014 DU_{89}	—	February 26, 2014	Haleakala	Pan-STARRS 1	·	3.2 km	MPC · JPL
602116	2014 DM_{92}	—	January 1, 2014	Mount Lemmon	Mount Lemmon Survey	·	1.5 km	MPC · JPL
602117	2014 DB_{94}	—	September 4, 2011	Haleakala	Pan-STARRS 1	·	1.6 km	MPC · JPL
602118	2014 DF_{94}	—	November 12, 2012	Mount Lemmon	Mount Lemmon Survey	·	1.1 km	MPC · JPL
602119	2014 DD_{98}	—	September 20, 2011	Haleakala	Pan-STARRS 1	·	1.6 km	MPC · JPL
602120	2014 DS_{101}	—	August 10, 2007	Kitt Peak	Spacewatch	·	1.5 km	MPC · JPL
602121	2014 DZ_{101}	—	January 28, 2014	Kitt Peak	Spacewatch	HNS	760 m	MPC · JPL
602122	2014 DU_{103}	—	February 27, 2014	Mount Lemmon	Mount Lemmon Survey	·	1.9 km	MPC · JPL
602123	2014 DQ_{106}	—	April 20, 2010	Mount Lemmon	Mount Lemmon Survey	·	1.8 km	MPC · JPL
602124	2014 DT_{106}	—	February 27, 2014	Mount Lemmon	Mount Lemmon Survey	KOR	1.2 km	MPC · JPL
602125	2014 DK_{109}	—	February 27, 2014	Mount Lemmon	Mount Lemmon Survey	H	400 m	MPC · JPL
602126	2014 DF_{110}	—	February 27, 2014	Haleakala	Pan-STARRS 1	·	1.5 km	MPC · JPL
602127	2014 DP_{112}	—	December 1, 2004	Catalina	CSS	·	1.4 km	MPC · JPL
602128	2014 DK_{114}	—	February 26, 2014	Mount Lemmon	Mount Lemmon Survey	·	1.5 km	MPC · JPL
602129	2014 DF_{116}	—	February 26, 2014	Haleakala	Pan-STARRS 1	AGN	1.0 km	MPC · JPL
602130	2014 DA_{118}	—	March 10, 2005	Mount Lemmon	Mount Lemmon Survey	·	1.6 km	MPC · JPL
602131	2014 DE_{118}	—	February 27, 2014	Kitt Peak	Spacewatch	·	1.6 km	MPC · JPL
602132	2014 DB_{119}	—	January 28, 2014	Kitt Peak	Spacewatch	·	2.8 km	MPC · JPL
602133	2014 DC_{119}	—	September 26, 2009	Kitt Peak	Spacewatch	L4	7.0 km	MPC · JPL
602134	2014 DN_{119}	—	September 25, 2008	Mount Lemmon	Mount Lemmon Survey	L4	7.3 km	MPC · JPL
602135	2014 DU_{120}	—	January 8, 2010	Mount Lemmon	Mount Lemmon Survey	·	1.8 km	MPC · JPL
602136	2014 DP_{122}	—	February 13, 2002	Kitt Peak	Spacewatch	L4	6.9 km	MPC · JPL
602137	2014 DD_{124}	—	February 28, 2014	Haleakala	Pan-STARRS 1	THB	2.1 km	MPC · JPL
602138	2014 DS_{127}	—	September 15, 2007	Lulin	LUSS	·	1.9 km	MPC · JPL
602139	2014 DS_{128}	—	February 28, 2014	Haleakala	Pan-STARRS 1	·	1.7 km	MPC · JPL
602140	2014 DD_{129}	—	March 3, 2005	Kitt Peak	Spacewatch	·	1.5 km	MPC · JPL
602141	2014 DM_{131}	—	December 2, 2012	Mount Lemmon	Mount Lemmon Survey	·	1.2 km	MPC · JPL
602142	2014 DN_{131}	—	October 27, 2012	Mount Lemmon	Mount Lemmon Survey	HYG	2.0 km	MPC · JPL
602143	2014 DO_{131}	—	December 4, 2012	Mount Lemmon	Mount Lemmon Survey	WIT	940 m	MPC · JPL
602144	2014 DT_{132}	—	February 28, 2014	Haleakala	Pan-STARRS 1	615	1.2 km	MPC · JPL
602145	2014 DM_{135}	—	February 2, 2013	Mount Lemmon	Mount Lemmon Survey	L4	6.4 km	MPC · JPL
602146	2014 DF_{140}	—	December 21, 2008	Catalina	CSS	·	1.5 km	MPC · JPL
602147	2014 DA_{141}	—	October 24, 2007	Mount Lemmon	Mount Lemmon Survey	·	1.9 km	MPC · JPL
602148	2014 DN_{141}	—	February 9, 2014	Haleakala	Pan-STARRS 1	·	1.7 km	MPC · JPL
602149	2014 DG_{144}	—	February 22, 2014	Mount Lemmon	Mount Lemmon Survey	H	410 m	MPC · JPL
602150	2014 DV_{147}	—	March 13, 2003	Kitt Peak	Spacewatch	·	1.6 km	MPC · JPL
602151	2014 DW_{148}	—	February 20, 2014	Mount Lemmon	Mount Lemmon Survey	·	1.8 km	MPC · JPL
602152	2014 DB_{150}	—	September 11, 2007	Mount Lemmon	Mount Lemmon Survey	·	1.8 km	MPC · JPL
602153	2014 DL_{150}	—	March 8, 2005	Kitt Peak	Spacewatch	·	1.3 km	MPC · JPL
602154	2014 DD_{152}	—	December 15, 2001	Apache Point	SDSS Collaboration	VER	2.1 km	MPC · JPL
602155	2014 DG_{152}	—	February 26, 2014	Haleakala	Pan-STARRS 1	·	1.5 km	MPC · JPL
602156	2014 DG_{156}	—	February 20, 2014	Mount Lemmon	Mount Lemmon Survey	HNS	1.1 km	MPC · JPL
602157	2014 DM_{156}	—	February 26, 2014	Haleakala	Pan-STARRS 1	HNS	1.0 km	MPC · JPL
602158	2014 DQ_{156}	—	February 27, 2014	Haleakala	Pan-STARRS 1	·	2.1 km	MPC · JPL
602159	2014 DS_{156}	—	March 19, 2015	Haleakala	Pan-STARRS 1	HNS	890 m	MPC · JPL
602160	2014 DW_{159}	—	January 29, 2014	Kitt Peak	Spacewatch	HNS	790 m	MPC · JPL
602161	2014 DE_{161}	—	February 26, 2014	Haleakala	Pan-STARRS 1	MAR	690 m	MPC · JPL
602162	2014 DQ_{162}	—	June 7, 2015	Haleakala	Pan-STARRS 1	·	1.3 km	MPC · JPL
602163	2014 DJ_{164}	—	February 26, 2014	Haleakala	Pan-STARRS 1	·	1.2 km	MPC · JPL
602164	2014 DD_{170}	—	February 26, 2014	Haleakala	Pan-STARRS 1	·	1.4 km	MPC · JPL
602165	2014 DF_{172}	—	February 26, 2014	Haleakala	Pan-STARRS 1	·	1.3 km	MPC · JPL
602166	2014 DR_{172}	—	February 28, 2014	Haleakala	Pan-STARRS 1	KOR	1.2 km	MPC · JPL
602167	2014 DK_{174}	—	February 24, 2014	Haleakala	Pan-STARRS 1	·	1.7 km	MPC · JPL
602168	2014 DO_{174}	—	February 20, 2014	Mount Lemmon	Mount Lemmon Survey	·	1.4 km	MPC · JPL
602169	2014 DC_{186}	—	April 7, 2006	Kitt Peak	Spacewatch	·	950 m	MPC · JPL
602170	2014 DG_{188}	—	February 28, 2014	Haleakala	Pan-STARRS 1	(2076)	550 m	MPC · JPL
602171	2014 DX_{188}	—	February 28, 2014	Haleakala	Pan-STARRS 1	KOR	1.3 km	MPC · JPL
602172	2014 EQ	—	January 23, 2014	Mount Lemmon	Mount Lemmon Survey	H	440 m	MPC · JPL
602173	2014 EO_{1}	—	January 27, 2006	Mount Lemmon	Mount Lemmon Survey	H	500 m	MPC · JPL
602174	2014 ES_{2}	—	September 27, 2008	Mount Lemmon	Mount Lemmon Survey	(5)	1.2 km	MPC · JPL
602175	2014 EU_{4}	—	February 26, 2014	Haleakala	Pan-STARRS 1	H	420 m	MPC · JPL
602176	2014 EM_{5}	—	September 29, 2011	Mount Lemmon	Mount Lemmon Survey	·	2.0 km	MPC · JPL
602177	2014 ET_{7}	—	March 5, 2014	Haleakala	Pan-STARRS 1	·	1.7 km	MPC · JPL
602178	2014 EV_{8}	—	August 3, 2002	Palomar	NEAT	·	2.1 km	MPC · JPL
602179	2014 EO_{9}	—	March 6, 2014	Mount Lemmon	Mount Lemmon Survey	·	1.5 km	MPC · JPL
602180	2014 EQ_{11}	—	January 31, 2009	Mount Lemmon	Mount Lemmon Survey	TIN	1.1 km	MPC · JPL
602181	2014 EY_{12}	—	November 19, 2003	Kitt Peak	Spacewatch	·	1.6 km	MPC · JPL
602182	2014 EP_{14}	—	August 26, 2000	Kitt Peak	Spacewatch	·	2.8 km	MPC · JPL
602183	2014 EB_{17}	—	March 5, 2014	Haleakala	Pan-STARRS 1	·	1.4 km	MPC · JPL
602184	2014 ER_{17}	—	April 2, 2005	Kitt Peak	Spacewatch	·	1.7 km	MPC · JPL
602185	2014 EC_{18}	—	March 10, 2003	Palomar	NEAT	·	3.1 km	MPC · JPL
602186	2014 EZ_{18}	—	April 2, 2005	Mount Lemmon	Mount Lemmon Survey	HOF	2.3 km	MPC · JPL
602187	2014 EQ_{19}	—	March 6, 2014	Kitt Peak	Spacewatch	·	1.3 km	MPC · JPL
602188	2014 EA_{21}	—	March 6, 2014	Mount Lemmon	Mount Lemmon Survey	·	1.7 km	MPC · JPL
602189	2014 EG_{24}	—	July 29, 2012	Haleakala	Pan-STARRS 1	H	440 m	MPC · JPL
602190	2014 EK_{26}	—	February 28, 2014	Haleakala	Pan-STARRS 1	·	1.5 km	MPC · JPL
602191	2014 EO_{28}	—	October 23, 2006	Palomar	NEAT	·	3.7 km	MPC · JPL
602192	2014 EL_{29}	—	March 6, 2014	Mount Lemmon	Mount Lemmon Survey	·	2.1 km	MPC · JPL
602193	2014 EJ_{31}	—	February 26, 2014	Haleakala	Pan-STARRS 1	KOR	1.3 km	MPC · JPL
602194	2014 EW_{31}	—	December 25, 2010	Mount Lemmon	Mount Lemmon Survey	L4 · ERY	8.3 km	MPC · JPL
602195	2014 EM_{33}	—	December 17, 2007	Kitt Peak	Spacewatch	·	2.3 km	MPC · JPL
602196	2014 EE_{35}	—	March 8, 2014	Mount Lemmon	Mount Lemmon Survey	·	1.2 km	MPC · JPL
602197	2014 EK_{35}	—	October 20, 2003	Kitt Peak	Spacewatch	·	1.6 km	MPC · JPL
602198	2014 EZ_{35}	—	March 8, 2014	Mount Lemmon	Mount Lemmon Survey	·	1.4 km	MPC · JPL
602199	2014 EX_{36}	—	December 30, 2008	Mount Lemmon	Mount Lemmon Survey	·	1.6 km	MPC · JPL
602200	2014 EU_{39}	—	January 19, 2001	Kitt Peak	Spacewatch	·	1.4 km	MPC · JPL

== 602201–602300 ==
back to top

Designation			Discovery			Properties		Ref
Permanent	Provisional	Named after	Date	Site	Discoverer(s)	Category	Diam.	Ref
602201	2014 EA_{41}	—	November 26, 2000	Socorro	LINEAR	·	1.2 km	MPC · JPL
602202	2014 EE_{43}	—	April 11, 2010	Mount Lemmon	Mount Lemmon Survey	·	1.2 km	MPC · JPL
602203	2014 EU_{44}	—	February 26, 2014	Haleakala	Pan-STARRS 1	BAR	1.2 km	MPC · JPL
602204	2014 ED_{46}	—	January 18, 2009	Mount Lemmon	Mount Lemmon Survey	·	1.7 km	MPC · JPL
602205	2014 EE_{48}	—	March 11, 2014	Mount Lemmon	Mount Lemmon Survey	·	1.4 km	MPC · JPL
602206	2014 EV_{49}	—	March 8, 2014	Catalina	CSS	·	1.8 km	MPC · JPL
602207	2014 EP_{51}	—	October 18, 2012	Haleakala	Pan-STARRS 1	·	1.6 km	MPC · JPL
602208	2014 EU_{53}	—	May 14, 2015	Haleakala	Pan-STARRS 1	MAR	730 m	MPC · JPL
602209	2014 EX_{58}	—	February 28, 2014	Haleakala	Pan-STARRS 1	·	1.4 km	MPC · JPL
602210	2014 EZ_{58}	—	September 20, 2008	Mount Lemmon	Mount Lemmon Survey	L4	7.0 km	MPC · JPL
602211	2014 EJ_{65}	—	September 6, 2008	Kitt Peak	Spacewatch	L4 · ERY	7.2 km	MPC · JPL
602212	2014 EX_{65}	—	May 26, 2015	Mount Lemmon	Mount Lemmon Survey	·	890 m	MPC · JPL
602213	2014 EK_{79}	—	August 29, 2016	Mount Lemmon	Mount Lemmon Survey	·	2.2 km	MPC · JPL
602214	2014 ED_{83}	—	January 18, 2009	Kitt Peak	Spacewatch	·	1.5 km	MPC · JPL
602215	2014 EL_{94}	—	September 3, 2008	Kitt Peak	Spacewatch	L4	7.2 km	MPC · JPL
602216	2014 EK_{95}	—	November 5, 2016	Haleakala	Pan-STARRS 1	·	790 m	MPC · JPL
602217	2014 EZ_{96}	—	February 28, 2014	Haleakala	Pan-STARRS 1	·	660 m	MPC · JPL
602218	2014 EQ_{100}	—	October 26, 2016	Mount Lemmon	Mount Lemmon Survey	·	1.2 km	MPC · JPL
602219	2014 EX_{101}	—	September 5, 2010	Mount Lemmon	Mount Lemmon Survey	L4 · ERY	5.5 km	MPC · JPL
602220	2014 EA_{102}	—	February 26, 2014	Haleakala	Pan-STARRS 1	·	1.2 km	MPC · JPL
602221	2014 ED_{106}	—	September 5, 2007	Mount Lemmon	Mount Lemmon Survey	HNS	940 m	MPC · JPL
602222	2014 EV_{110}	—	June 16, 2015	Haleakala	Pan-STARRS 1	DOR	1.4 km	MPC · JPL
602223	2014 EK_{111}	—	August 8, 2012	Haleakala	Pan-STARRS 1	·	780 m	MPC · JPL
602224	2014 EH_{117}	—	January 5, 2013	Kitt Peak	Spacewatch	L4	7.5 km	MPC · JPL
602225	2014 EK_{117}	—	September 18, 2003	Kitt Peak	Spacewatch	·	1.2 km	MPC · JPL
602226	2014 ED_{118}	—	February 26, 2004	Kitt Peak	Deep Ecliptic Survey	·	1.4 km	MPC · JPL
602227	2014 EL_{120}	—	March 3, 2014	Cerro Tololo	DECam	L4	6.1 km	MPC · JPL
602228	2014 EB_{122}	—	September 14, 2007	Mount Lemmon	Mount Lemmon Survey	·	1.4 km	MPC · JPL
602229	2014 ED_{123}	—	August 23, 2003	Palomar	NEAT	EUN	1.2 km	MPC · JPL
602230	2014 ET_{123}	—	November 13, 2012	Mount Lemmon	Mount Lemmon Survey	·	1.2 km	MPC · JPL
602231	2014 EL_{126}	—	October 10, 2016	Haleakala	Pan-STARRS 1	MAR	720 m	MPC · JPL
602232	2014 EA_{129}	—	November 15, 2010	Kitt Peak	Spacewatch	L4	10 km	MPC · JPL
602233	2014 ED_{140}	—	August 30, 2016	Mount Lemmon	Mount Lemmon Survey	·	1.2 km	MPC · JPL
602234	2014 EU_{157}	—	February 5, 2009	Kitt Peak	Spacewatch	·	1.5 km	MPC · JPL
602235	2014 EY_{158}	—	March 6, 2014	Tenerife	ESA OGS	WIT	710 m	MPC · JPL
602236	2014 EN_{161}	—	July 9, 2016	Haleakala	Pan-STARRS 1	EOS	1.3 km	MPC · JPL
602237	2014 EF_{171}	—	January 25, 2009	Kitt Peak	Spacewatch	·	1.7 km	MPC · JPL
602238	2014 EC_{182}	—	September 5, 2008	Kitt Peak	Spacewatch	L4	8.3 km	MPC · JPL
602239	2014 EG_{188}	—	August 24, 2008	Kitt Peak	Spacewatch	L4	7.3 km	MPC · JPL
602240	2014 EB_{202}	—	September 4, 2007	Catalina	CSS	·	1.4 km	MPC · JPL
602241	2014 EC_{206}	—	October 12, 2016	Haleakala	Pan-STARRS 1	MAR	760 m	MPC · JPL
602242	2014 ES_{210}	—	October 9, 2016	Mount Lemmon	Mount Lemmon Survey	·	1.5 km	MPC · JPL
602243	2014 EY_{213}	—	September 20, 2007	Kitt Peak	Spacewatch	·	1.2 km	MPC · JPL
602244	2014 EU_{214}	—	March 5, 2014	Cerro Tololo	DECam	·	1.7 km	MPC · JPL
602245	2014 ET_{217}	—	September 18, 2006	Kitt Peak	Spacewatch	·	2.6 km	MPC · JPL
602246	2014 EX_{221}	—	February 24, 2009	Mount Lemmon	Mount Lemmon Survey	·	1.8 km	MPC · JPL
602247	2014 EJ_{224}	—	September 5, 2007	Mount Lemmon	Mount Lemmon Survey	L4	8.9 km	MPC · JPL
602248	2014 EY_{226}	—	October 21, 2012	Mount Lemmon	Mount Lemmon Survey	·	1.6 km	MPC · JPL
602249	2014 EN_{231}	—	July 11, 2016	Haleakala	Pan-STARRS 1	·	1.2 km	MPC · JPL
602250	2014 EH_{234}	—	September 5, 2008	Kitt Peak	Spacewatch	L4	6.4 km	MPC · JPL
602251	2014 EC_{238}	—	February 20, 2014	Mount Lemmon	Mount Lemmon Survey	(31811)	2.4 km	MPC · JPL
602252	2014 EF_{238}	—	September 20, 2006	Kitt Peak	Spacewatch	·	1.7 km	MPC · JPL
602253	2014 ER_{240}	—	October 29, 2006	Kitt Peak	Spacewatch	·	2.3 km	MPC · JPL
602254	2014 EO_{247}	—	December 28, 2011	Mount Lemmon	Mount Lemmon Survey	L4	7.5 km	MPC · JPL
602255	2014 EE_{249}	—	October 22, 2003	Apache Point	SDSS Collaboration	·	1.7 km	MPC · JPL
602256	2014 EO_{249}	—	October 8, 2012	Haleakala	Pan-STARRS 1	·	1.4 km	MPC · JPL
602257	2014 EU_{249}	—	January 29, 2014	Catalina	CSS	HNS	1.1 km	MPC · JPL
602258	2014 ER_{254}	—	March 6, 2014	Mount Lemmon	Mount Lemmon Survey	L4	6.9 km	MPC · JPL
602259	2014 FC	—	March 18, 2014	Haleakala	Pan-STARRS 1	H	450 m	MPC · JPL
602260	2014 FS_{1}	—	April 20, 2010	Mount Lemmon	Mount Lemmon Survey	EUN	1.0 km	MPC · JPL
602261	2014 FE_{2}	—	April 1, 2003	Apache Point	SDSS Collaboration	L4	6.3 km	MPC · JPL
602262	2014 FG_{3}	—	March 20, 2014	Mount Lemmon	Mount Lemmon Survey	·	1.6 km	MPC · JPL
602263	2014 FJ_{4}	—	October 16, 2010	Charleston	R. Holmes	L4	8.5 km	MPC · JPL
602264	2014 FO_{6}	—	November 12, 2001	Apache Point	SDSS Collaboration	·	1.9 km	MPC · JPL
602265	2014 FW_{6}	—	February 25, 2014	Haleakala	Pan-STARRS 1	H	490 m	MPC · JPL
602266	2014 FS_{7}	—	February 24, 2006	Kitt Peak	Spacewatch	H	370 m	MPC · JPL
602267	2014 FQ_{8}	—	March 5, 2008	Vail-Jarnac	Jarnac	·	3.0 km	MPC · JPL
602268	2014 FD_{10}	—	February 16, 2010	Mount Lemmon	Mount Lemmon Survey	·	740 m	MPC · JPL
602269	2014 FR_{15}	—	February 27, 2014	Kitt Peak	Spacewatch	·	1.3 km	MPC · JPL
602270	2014 FB_{17}	—	March 17, 2005	Mount Lemmon	Mount Lemmon Survey	·	1.7 km	MPC · JPL
602271	2014 FX_{17}	—	October 11, 2007	Mount Lemmon	Mount Lemmon Survey	·	1.7 km	MPC · JPL
602272	2014 FZ_{17}	—	September 21, 2011	Mount Lemmon	Mount Lemmon Survey	·	1.1 km	MPC · JPL
602273	2014 FH_{19}	—	November 13, 2012	Mount Lemmon	Mount Lemmon Survey	EOS	2.1 km	MPC · JPL
602274	2014 FT_{19}	—	January 28, 2014	Kitt Peak	Spacewatch	(194)	1.1 km	MPC · JPL
602275	2014 FX_{22}	—	February 10, 2014	Haleakala	Pan-STARRS 1	H	420 m	MPC · JPL
602276	2014 FA_{23}	—	October 7, 2007	Mount Lemmon	Mount Lemmon Survey	·	1.6 km	MPC · JPL
602277	2014 FB_{30}	—	March 10, 2005	Mount Lemmon	Mount Lemmon Survey	·	1.8 km	MPC · JPL
602278	2014 FN_{30}	—	March 12, 2014	Mount Lemmon	Mount Lemmon Survey	EOS	1.3 km	MPC · JPL
602279	2014 FX_{30}	—	March 23, 2014	Mount Lemmon	Mount Lemmon Survey	·	2.4 km	MPC · JPL
602280	2014 FR_{34}	—	February 9, 2014	Haleakala	Pan-STARRS 1	EOS	1.8 km	MPC · JPL
602281	2014 FN_{35}	—	March 19, 2009	Bergisch Gladbach	W. Bickel	·	2.3 km	MPC · JPL
602282	2014 FU_{37}	—	July 29, 2012	Haleakala	Pan-STARRS 1	H	500 m	MPC · JPL
602283	2014 FG_{38}	—	November 22, 2011	Mount Lemmon	Mount Lemmon Survey	L4	7.9 km	MPC · JPL
602284	2014 FY_{41}	—	November 19, 2003	Kitt Peak	Spacewatch	·	2.0 km	MPC · JPL
602285	2014 FR_{43}	—	March 29, 2014	Mount Lemmon	Mount Lemmon Survey	H	320 m	MPC · JPL
602286	2014 FV_{43}	—	September 13, 2007	Mount Lemmon	Mount Lemmon Survey	H	410 m	MPC · JPL
602287	2014 FV_{49}	—	October 22, 2012	Haleakala	Pan-STARRS 1	·	2.5 km	MPC · JPL
602288	2014 FP_{51}	—	March 27, 2014	Haleakala	Pan-STARRS 1	·	1.4 km	MPC · JPL
602289	2014 FR_{51}	—	January 30, 2003	Kitt Peak	Spacewatch	·	1.9 km	MPC · JPL
602290	2014 FK_{52}	—	February 24, 2014	Haleakala	Pan-STARRS 1	·	1.7 km	MPC · JPL
602291	2014 FC_{64}	—	August 21, 2006	Cerro Tololo	Wasserman, L. H.	·	1.7 km	MPC · JPL
602292	2014 FJ_{65}	—	March 28, 2014	Mount Lemmon	Mount Lemmon Survey	·	1.7 km	MPC · JPL
602293	2014 FJ_{66}	—	January 29, 2009	Kitt Peak	Spacewatch	·	1.7 km	MPC · JPL
602294	2014 FV_{68}	—	March 1, 2008	Kitt Peak	Spacewatch	T_{j} (2.98)	2.9 km	MPC · JPL
602295	2014 FS_{72}	—	October 9, 2007	Kitt Peak	Spacewatch	H	450 m	MPC · JPL
602296	2014 FU_{72}	—	March 24, 2014	Haleakala	Pan-STARRS 1	H	420 m	MPC · JPL
602297	2014 FD_{73}	—	March 25, 2014	Kitt Peak	Spacewatch	·	2.4 km	MPC · JPL
602298	2014 FB_{77}	—	March 24, 2014	Haleakala	Pan-STARRS 1	·	1.5 km	MPC · JPL
602299	2014 FD_{77}	—	March 27, 2014	Mount Lemmon	Mount Lemmon Survey	·	1.6 km	MPC · JPL
602300	2014 FT_{80}	—	June 18, 2015	Haleakala	Pan-STARRS 1	·	1.2 km	MPC · JPL

== 602301–602400 ==
back to top

Designation			Discovery			Properties		Ref
Permanent	Provisional	Named after	Date	Site	Discoverer(s)	Category	Diam.	Ref
602301	2014 FA_{83}	—	March 31, 2014	Kitt Peak	Spacewatch	GEF	1.2 km	MPC · JPL
602302	2014 FP_{83}	—	March 31, 2014	Mount Lemmon	Mount Lemmon Survey	·	1.2 km	MPC · JPL
602303	2014 GQ_{7}	—	March 10, 2014	Kitt Peak	Spacewatch	·	1.6 km	MPC · JPL
602304	2014 GV_{8}	—	February 26, 2014	Haleakala	Pan-STARRS 1	·	1.7 km	MPC · JPL
602305	2014 GG_{9}	—	February 26, 2014	Haleakala	Pan-STARRS 1	·	1.4 km	MPC · JPL
602306	2014 GG_{12}	—	March 8, 2014	Kitt Peak	Spacewatch	EOS	1.4 km	MPC · JPL
602307	2014 GP_{13}	—	February 22, 2014	Mount Lemmon	Mount Lemmon Survey	·	1.5 km	MPC · JPL
602308	2014 GR_{18}	—	April 3, 2014	XuYi	PMO NEO Survey Program	·	2.7 km	MPC · JPL
602309	2014 GW_{19}	—	November 8, 2007	Kitt Peak	Spacewatch	·	2.3 km	MPC · JPL
602310	2014 GZ_{19}	—	April 20, 2009	Mount Lemmon	Mount Lemmon Survey	·	1.9 km	MPC · JPL
602311	2014 GE_{23}	—	April 4, 2014	Mount Lemmon	Mount Lemmon Survey	GEF	1.1 km	MPC · JPL
602312	2014 GB_{25}	—	October 1, 2005	Catalina	CSS	TIR	2.8 km	MPC · JPL
602313	2014 GX_{25}	—	January 26, 2009	Bergisch Gladbach	W. Bickel	·	1.6 km	MPC · JPL
602314	2014 GL_{27}	—	November 19, 2012	Kitt Peak	Spacewatch	·	1.4 km	MPC · JPL
602315	2014 GU_{35}	—	April 1, 2014	XuYi	PMO NEO Survey Program	·	2.4 km	MPC · JPL
602316	2014 GW_{35}	—	January 17, 2004	Palomar	NEAT	·	3.2 km	MPC · JPL
602317	2014 GT_{37}	—	August 27, 2005	Kitt Peak	Spacewatch	·	3.3 km	MPC · JPL
602318	2014 GK_{44}	—	February 24, 2006	Palomar	NEAT	H	660 m	MPC · JPL
602319	2014 GT_{44}	—	October 29, 2005	Palomar	NEAT	H	510 m	MPC · JPL
602320	2014 GO_{45}	—	April 6, 2014	Catalina	CSS	·	3.2 km	MPC · JPL
602321	2014 GH_{48}	—	March 8, 2014	Mount Lemmon	Mount Lemmon Survey	L4	7.5 km	MPC · JPL
602322	2014 GG_{50}	—	October 27, 2008	Mount Lemmon	Mount Lemmon Survey	·	1.4 km	MPC · JPL
602323	2014 GO_{53}	—	November 12, 2010	Mount Lemmon	Mount Lemmon Survey	L4	7.7 km	MPC · JPL
602324	2014 GV_{61}	—	April 5, 2014	Haleakala	Pan-STARRS 1	·	1.5 km	MPC · JPL
602325	2014 GH_{68}	—	April 6, 2014	Mount Lemmon	Mount Lemmon Survey	·	1.9 km	MPC · JPL
602326	2014 GM_{76}	—	April 5, 2014	Haleakala	Pan-STARRS 1	·	1.3 km	MPC · JPL
602327	2014 GW_{77}	—	April 5, 2014	Haleakala	Pan-STARRS 1	·	1.4 km	MPC · JPL
602328	2014 GV_{79}	—	April 1, 2014	Mount Lemmon	Mount Lemmon Survey	·	1.4 km	MPC · JPL
602329	2014 GW_{85}	—	April 5, 2014	Haleakala	Pan-STARRS 1	·	1.6 km	MPC · JPL
602330	2014 HA_{3}	—	November 6, 2002	Palomar	NEAT	H	540 m	MPC · JPL
602331	2014 HS_{3}	—	November 16, 2007	Mount Lemmon	Mount Lemmon Survey	·	2.1 km	MPC · JPL
602332	2014 HF_{4}	—	February 10, 2014	Haleakala	Pan-STARRS 1	·	2.5 km	MPC · JPL
602333	2014 HE_{8}	—	March 1, 2009	Catalina	CSS	·	1.9 km	MPC · JPL
602334	2014 HG_{10}	—	April 5, 2014	Haleakala	Pan-STARRS 1	·	1.4 km	MPC · JPL
602335	2014 HN_{10}	—	April 5, 2014	Haleakala	Pan-STARRS 1	AGN	1.0 km	MPC · JPL
602336	2014 HP_{10}	—	April 5, 2014	Haleakala	Pan-STARRS 1	·	1.1 km	MPC · JPL
602337	2014 HP_{11}	—	August 10, 2010	Kitt Peak	Spacewatch	·	1.6 km	MPC · JPL
602338	2014 HE_{12}	—	November 15, 2011	Mount Lemmon	Mount Lemmon Survey	·	1.9 km	MPC · JPL
602339	2014 HT_{12}	—	April 15, 2008	Mount Lemmon	Mount Lemmon Survey	·	1.8 km	MPC · JPL
602340	2014 HY_{14}	—	September 27, 2003	Kitt Peak	Spacewatch	·	1.7 km	MPC · JPL
602341	2014 HP_{23}	—	September 9, 2004	Kitt Peak	Spacewatch	·	1.8 km	MPC · JPL
602342	2014 HC_{24}	—	September 10, 2007	Kitt Peak	Spacewatch	·	2.0 km	MPC · JPL
602343	2014 HX_{28}	—	April 2, 2014	Kitt Peak	Spacewatch	KOR	1.2 km	MPC · JPL
602344	2014 HR_{31}	—	September 15, 2006	Kitt Peak	Spacewatch	·	1.6 km	MPC · JPL
602345	2014 HQ_{32}	—	September 25, 2011	Haleakala	Pan-STARRS 1	·	1.6 km	MPC · JPL
602346	2014 HT_{38}	—	April 7, 2005	Kitt Peak	Spacewatch	·	1.6 km	MPC · JPL
602347	2014 HL_{49}	—	January 9, 2006	Kitt Peak	Spacewatch	MAS	490 m	MPC · JPL
602348	2014 HW_{59}	—	March 27, 2014	Haleakala	Pan-STARRS 1	KOR	1.1 km	MPC · JPL
602349	2014 HV_{60}	—	April 23, 2014	Cerro Tololo-DECam	DECam	EOS	1.5 km	MPC · JPL
602350	2014 HC_{66}	—	April 20, 2014	Mount Lemmon	Mount Lemmon Survey	·	1.4 km	MPC · JPL
602351	2014 HD_{71}	—	December 23, 2012	Haleakala	Pan-STARRS 1	·	1.2 km	MPC · JPL
602352	2014 HT_{97}	—	April 23, 2014	Cerro Tololo-DECam	DECam	·	1.5 km	MPC · JPL
602353	2014 HN_{100}	—	January 5, 2013	Kitt Peak	Spacewatch	KOR	1.1 km	MPC · JPL
602354	2014 HW_{100}	—	October 28, 2011	Ka-Dar	Gerke, V.	·	1.8 km	MPC · JPL
602355	2014 HG_{112}	—	April 23, 2014	Cerro Tololo-DECam	DECam	·	1.7 km	MPC · JPL
602356	2014 HL_{112}	—	October 27, 2008	Mount Lemmon	Mount Lemmon Survey	·	990 m	MPC · JPL
602357	2014 HK_{115}	—	April 24, 2014	Mount Lemmon	Mount Lemmon Survey	TEL	970 m	MPC · JPL
602358	2014 HK_{117}	—	April 23, 2014	Cerro Tololo-DECam	DECam	·	1.3 km	MPC · JPL
602359	2014 HR_{134}	—	February 9, 2008	Kitt Peak	Spacewatch	·	1.4 km	MPC · JPL
602360	2014 HX_{136}	—	October 20, 2007	Mount Lemmon	Mount Lemmon Survey	·	1.3 km	MPC · JPL
602361	2014 HP_{141}	—	October 24, 2011	Haleakala	Pan-STARRS 1	EOS	1.5 km	MPC · JPL
602362	2014 HG_{146}	—	December 13, 2012	Mount Lemmon	Mount Lemmon Survey	·	1.4 km	MPC · JPL
602363	2014 HG_{147}	—	September 29, 2008	Mount Lemmon	Mount Lemmon Survey	L4	9.1 km	MPC · JPL
602364	2014 HY_{148}	—	October 26, 2011	Haleakala	Pan-STARRS 1	NAE	1.6 km	MPC · JPL
602365	2014 HE_{153}	—	February 9, 2013	Haleakala	Pan-STARRS 1	·	1.4 km	MPC · JPL
602366	2014 HO_{154}	—	October 6, 2005	Kitt Peak	Spacewatch	·	2.1 km	MPC · JPL
602367	2014 HZ_{158}	—	November 11, 2001	Apache Point	SDSS Collaboration	·	1.8 km	MPC · JPL
602368	2014 HK_{164}	—	March 28, 2014	Haleakala	Pan-STARRS 1	·	2.1 km	MPC · JPL
602369	2014 HE_{165}	—	April 5, 2014	Haleakala	Pan-STARRS 1	GEF	920 m	MPC · JPL
602370	2014 HR_{165}	—	April 7, 2014	Mount Lemmon	Mount Lemmon Survey	NAE	1.7 km	MPC · JPL
602371	2014 HJ_{173}	—	February 10, 2008	Kitt Peak	Spacewatch	EOS	1.5 km	MPC · JPL
602372	2014 HB_{176}	—	April 29, 2014	Haleakala	Pan-STARRS 1	·	2.4 km	MPC · JPL
602373	2014 HS_{176}	—	February 28, 2014	Haleakala	Pan-STARRS 1	·	1.1 km	MPC · JPL
602374	2014 HN_{180}	—	February 28, 2014	Haleakala	Pan-STARRS 1	·	1.9 km	MPC · JPL
602375	2014 HN_{184}	—	April 30, 2014	Haleakala	Pan-STARRS 1	·	1.4 km	MPC · JPL
602376	2014 HQ_{186}	—	April 2, 2014	Kitt Peak	Spacewatch	EUP	2.6 km	MPC · JPL
602377	2014 HY_{188}	—	March 19, 2009	Kitt Peak	Spacewatch	·	1.7 km	MPC · JPL
602378	2014 HB_{189}	—	October 27, 2011	Mount Lemmon	Mount Lemmon Survey	·	2.0 km	MPC · JPL
602379	2014 HD_{194}	—	June 29, 2015	Haleakala	Pan-STARRS 1	·	1.2 km	MPC · JPL
602380	2014 HB_{195}	—	April 30, 2014	Haleakala	Pan-STARRS 1	·	4.0 km	MPC · JPL
602381	2014 HK_{203}	—	April 24, 2014	Haleakala	Pan-STARRS 1	EOS	1.4 km	MPC · JPL
602382	2014 HN_{204}	—	April 21, 2014	Kitt Peak	Spacewatch	·	1.5 km	MPC · JPL
602383	2014 HX_{205}	—	April 29, 2014	Oukaïmeden	C. Rinner	·	1.6 km	MPC · JPL
602384	2014 HF_{206}	—	January 7, 2013	Mount Lemmon	Mount Lemmon Survey	·	1.9 km	MPC · JPL
602385	2014 HN_{206}	—	April 29, 2014	Haleakala	Pan-STARRS 1	·	1.5 km	MPC · JPL
602386	2014 HT_{206}	—	April 30, 2014	Haleakala	Pan-STARRS 1	·	1.8 km	MPC · JPL
602387	2014 HT_{211}	—	April 24, 2014	Haleakala	Pan-STARRS 1	EOS	1.5 km	MPC · JPL
602388	2014 HK_{216}	—	April 25, 2014	Mount Lemmon	Mount Lemmon Survey	·	1.3 km	MPC · JPL
602389	2014 HU_{216}	—	February 28, 2008	Kitt Peak	Spacewatch	·	1.9 km	MPC · JPL
602390	2014 HZ_{219}	—	April 30, 2014	Haleakala	Pan-STARRS 1	·	1.4 km	MPC · JPL
602391	2014 HO_{220}	—	April 30, 2014	Haleakala	Pan-STARRS 1	EOS	1.3 km	MPC · JPL
602392	2014 HG_{221}	—	April 29, 2014	Haleakala	Pan-STARRS 1	EOS	1.4 km	MPC · JPL
602393	2014 HO_{221}	—	April 24, 2014	Mount Lemmon	Mount Lemmon Survey	EOS	1.4 km	MPC · JPL
602394	2014 HF_{224}	—	April 21, 2014	Mount Lemmon	Mount Lemmon Survey	·	1.3 km	MPC · JPL
602395	2014 HY_{231}	—	April 25, 2014	Mount Lemmon	Mount Lemmon Survey	·	2.5 km	MPC · JPL
602396	2014 JR_{6}	—	May 3, 2014	Mount Lemmon	Mount Lemmon Survey	·	1.3 km	MPC · JPL
602397	2014 JW_{7}	—	May 3, 2014	Mount Lemmon	Mount Lemmon Survey	·	2.0 km	MPC · JPL
602398	2014 JU_{9}	—	October 26, 2011	Haleakala	Pan-STARRS 1	·	1.5 km	MPC · JPL
602399	2014 JM_{13}	—	December 13, 2006	Kitt Peak	Spacewatch	·	2.1 km	MPC · JPL
602400	2014 JS_{15}	—	May 2, 2014	WISE	WISE	T_{j} (2.99)	3.7 km	MPC · JPL

== 602401–602500 ==
back to top

Designation			Discovery			Properties		Ref
Permanent	Provisional	Named after	Date	Site	Discoverer(s)	Category	Diam.	Ref
602401	2014 JF_{18}	—	May 3, 2014	Mount Lemmon	Mount Lemmon Survey	·	1.4 km	MPC · JPL
602402	2014 JO_{19}	—	October 20, 2011	Mount Lemmon	Mount Lemmon Survey	T_{j} (2.99) · EUP	3.0 km	MPC · JPL
602403	2014 JP_{22}	—	May 4, 2014	Mount Lemmon	Mount Lemmon Survey	·	2.3 km	MPC · JPL
602404	2014 JZ_{22}	—	April 4, 2014	Mount Lemmon	Mount Lemmon Survey	·	1.2 km	MPC · JPL
602405	2014 JN_{23}	—	April 4, 2014	Haleakala	Pan-STARRS 1	·	1.6 km	MPC · JPL
602406	2014 JF_{28}	—	May 4, 2014	Mount Lemmon	Mount Lemmon Survey	EOS	1.6 km	MPC · JPL
602407	2014 JF_{29}	—	February 7, 2013	Oukaïmeden	C. Rinner	·	2.4 km	MPC · JPL
602408	2014 JJ_{35}	—	May 4, 2014	Mount Lemmon	Mount Lemmon Survey	·	1.5 km	MPC · JPL
602409	2014 JT_{36}	—	April 30, 2014	Haleakala	Pan-STARRS 1	·	1.7 km	MPC · JPL
602410	2014 JM_{46}	—	May 2, 2014	Kitt Peak	Spacewatch	·	2.0 km	MPC · JPL
602411	2014 JC_{48}	—	May 6, 2014	Haleakala	Pan-STARRS 1	EOS	1.3 km	MPC · JPL
602412	2014 JZ_{49}	—	May 8, 2014	Haleakala	Pan-STARRS 1	·	1.7 km	MPC · JPL
602413	2014 JH_{50}	—	July 8, 2005	Kitt Peak	Spacewatch	·	2.2 km	MPC · JPL
602414	2014 JO_{55}	—	April 9, 2014	Haleakala	Pan-STARRS 1	H	530 m	MPC · JPL
602415	2014 JT_{58}	—	June 24, 2009	Kitt Peak	Spacewatch	·	1.9 km	MPC · JPL
602416	2014 JL_{61}	—	May 7, 2014	Haleakala	Pan-STARRS 1	·	1.9 km	MPC · JPL
602417	2014 JT_{62}	—	April 8, 2014	Mount Lemmon	Mount Lemmon Survey	·	1.8 km	MPC · JPL
602418	2014 JW_{66}	—	May 1, 2014	Mount Lemmon	Mount Lemmon Survey	·	1.8 km	MPC · JPL
602419	2014 JX_{66}	—	May 1, 2014	Mount Lemmon	Mount Lemmon Survey	(194)	1.4 km	MPC · JPL
602420	2014 JL_{73}	—	October 2, 2010	Nogales	M. Schwartz, P. R. Holvorcem	·	3.6 km	MPC · JPL
602421	2014 JF_{74}	—	April 30, 2014	Haleakala	Pan-STARRS 1	·	1.8 km	MPC · JPL
602422	2014 JK_{74}	—	March 12, 2014	Haleakala	Pan-STARRS 1	·	2.3 km	MPC · JPL
602423	2014 JS_{76}	—	April 30, 2014	Haleakala	Pan-STARRS 1	HNS	1.1 km	MPC · JPL
602424	2014 JZ_{78}	—	May 6, 2014	Haleakala	Pan-STARRS 1	BRA	1.7 km	MPC · JPL
602425	2014 JB_{82}	—	May 1, 2014	Mount Lemmon	Mount Lemmon Survey	·	2.2 km	MPC · JPL
602426	2014 JX_{82}	—	May 5, 2014	Mount Lemmon	Mount Lemmon Survey	·	790 m	MPC · JPL
602427	2014 JS_{83}	—	May 10, 2014	Haleakala	Pan-STARRS 1	·	3.2 km	MPC · JPL
602428	2014 JJ_{86}	—	May 3, 2014	Mount Lemmon	Mount Lemmon Survey	TEL	1.0 km	MPC · JPL
602429	2014 JU_{86}	—	April 24, 2014	Kitt Peak	Spacewatch	·	1.5 km	MPC · JPL
602430	2014 JU_{89}	—	May 6, 2014	Haleakala	Pan-STARRS 1	·	1.5 km	MPC · JPL
602431	2014 JV_{89}	—	March 8, 2013	Haleakala	Pan-STARRS 1	EOS	1.4 km	MPC · JPL
602432	2014 JJ_{91}	—	February 13, 2013	Haleakala	Pan-STARRS 1	·	1.5 km	MPC · JPL
602433	2014 JN_{92}	—	May 7, 2014	Haleakala	Pan-STARRS 1	·	1.9 km	MPC · JPL
602434	2014 JE_{93}	—	May 7, 2014	Haleakala	Pan-STARRS 1	·	2.2 km	MPC · JPL
602435	2014 JO_{95}	—	May 7, 2014	Haleakala	Pan-STARRS 1	·	1.8 km	MPC · JPL
602436	2014 JT_{104}	—	May 10, 2014	Kitt Peak	Spacewatch	EOS	1.3 km	MPC · JPL
602437	2014 JX_{105}	—	May 6, 2014	Haleakala	Pan-STARRS 1	·	1.8 km	MPC · JPL
602438	2014 JD_{106}	—	May 8, 2014	Haleakala	Pan-STARRS 1	·	1.4 km	MPC · JPL
602439	2014 JU_{106}	—	May 8, 2014	Haleakala	Pan-STARRS 1	·	1.3 km	MPC · JPL
602440	2014 JR_{108}	—	May 7, 2014	Haleakala	Pan-STARRS 1	EOS	1.4 km	MPC · JPL
602441	2014 JW_{110}	—	May 6, 2014	Haleakala	Pan-STARRS 1	·	1.4 km	MPC · JPL
602442	2014 JV_{111}	—	May 10, 2014	Haleakala	Pan-STARRS 1	·	2.1 km	MPC · JPL
602443	2014 JL_{114}	—	May 4, 2014	Haleakala	Pan-STARRS 1	·	2.0 km	MPC · JPL
602444	2014 JP_{114}	—	May 8, 2014	Haleakala	Pan-STARRS 1	·	1.4 km	MPC · JPL
602445	2014 JB_{126}	—	May 8, 2014	Haleakala	Pan-STARRS 1	EOS	1.5 km	MPC · JPL
602446	2014 KE	—	October 7, 2008	Mount Lemmon	Mount Lemmon Survey	·	720 m	MPC · JPL
602447	2014 KW_{3}	—	May 9, 2014	Haleakala	Pan-STARRS 1	·	2.4 km	MPC · JPL
602448	2014 KK_{4}	—	April 19, 2009	Catalina	CSS	T_{j} (2.84)	3.0 km	MPC · JPL
602449	2014 KS_{5}	—	November 17, 2006	Kitt Peak	Spacewatch	·	1.8 km	MPC · JPL
602450	2014 KC_{8}	—	May 21, 2014	Haleakala	Pan-STARRS 1	·	1.3 km	MPC · JPL
602451	2014 KM_{8}	—	December 11, 2012	Mount Lemmon	Mount Lemmon Survey	·	1.4 km	MPC · JPL
602452	2014 KL_{10}	—	October 2, 2010	Mount Lemmon	Mount Lemmon Survey	·	2.2 km	MPC · JPL
602453	2014 KM_{10}	—	May 8, 2014	Haleakala	Pan-STARRS 1	·	1.4 km	MPC · JPL
602454	2014 KH_{14}	—	April 30, 2014	Haleakala	Pan-STARRS 1	·	1.5 km	MPC · JPL
602455	2014 KD_{15}	—	April 4, 2014	Kitt Peak	Spacewatch	·	2.2 km	MPC · JPL
602456	2014 KE_{15}	—	May 4, 2000	Apache Point	SDSS Collaboration	·	2.2 km	MPC · JPL
602457	2014 KF_{15}	—	January 28, 2004	Socorro	LINEAR	·	2.2 km	MPC · JPL
602458	2014 KM_{19}	—	October 12, 2005	Kitt Peak	Spacewatch	·	2.3 km	MPC · JPL
602459	2014 KD_{21}	—	August 19, 2006	Palomar	NEAT	·	840 m	MPC · JPL
602460	2014 KN_{22}	—	April 26, 1995	Kitt Peak	Spacewatch	BRA	1.4 km	MPC · JPL
602461	2014 KO_{23}	—	October 19, 2011	Mount Lemmon	Mount Lemmon Survey	·	1.4 km	MPC · JPL
602462	2014 KW_{25}	—	October 3, 2005	Catalina	CSS	·	1.7 km	MPC · JPL
602463	2014 KH_{26}	—	May 7, 2014	Haleakala	Pan-STARRS 1	·	2.0 km	MPC · JPL
602464	2014 KY_{27}	—	September 24, 2011	Haleakala	Pan-STARRS 1	·	2.3 km	MPC · JPL
602465	2014 KB_{30}	—	May 3, 2014	Mount Lemmon	Mount Lemmon Survey	ANF	1.2 km	MPC · JPL
602466	2014 KH_{30}	—	May 22, 2014	Haleakala	Pan-STARRS 1	·	1.7 km	MPC · JPL
602467	2014 KF_{32}	—	May 7, 2014	Haleakala	Pan-STARRS 1	·	1.6 km	MPC · JPL
602468	2014 KC_{35}	—	March 26, 2014	Mount Lemmon	Mount Lemmon Survey	615	1.2 km	MPC · JPL
602469	2014 KW_{36}	—	February 28, 2009	Mount Lemmon	Mount Lemmon Survey	·	1.7 km	MPC · JPL
602470	2014 KJ_{40}	—	May 7, 2014	Haleakala	Pan-STARRS 1	H	350 m	MPC · JPL
602471	2014 KM_{42}	—	May 8, 2014	Haleakala	Pan-STARRS 1	·	1.6 km	MPC · JPL
602472	2014 KY_{43}	—	February 24, 2008	Kitt Peak	Spacewatch	EOS	1.7 km	MPC · JPL
602473	2014 KN_{45}	—	November 4, 2012	Haleakala	Pan-STARRS 1	H	400 m	MPC · JPL
602474	2014 KP_{46}	—	March 11, 2008	Mount Lemmon	Mount Lemmon Survey	TIR	2.0 km	MPC · JPL
602475	2014 KP_{50}	—	May 1, 2014	Mount Lemmon	Mount Lemmon Survey	·	1.7 km	MPC · JPL
602476	2014 KY_{51}	—	August 8, 2010	Charleston	R. Holmes	EUN	1.2 km	MPC · JPL
602477	2014 KD_{54}	—	April 1, 2003	Apache Point	SDSS Collaboration	·	1.6 km	MPC · JPL
602478	2014 KM_{54}	—	October 8, 2005	Kitt Peak	Spacewatch	·	2.0 km	MPC · JPL
602479	2014 KZ_{56}	—	May 4, 2014	Mount Lemmon	Mount Lemmon Survey	H	390 m	MPC · JPL
602480	2014 KE_{57}	—	May 24, 2014	Mount Lemmon	Mount Lemmon Survey	·	2.0 km	MPC · JPL
602481	2014 KM_{58}	—	January 19, 2013	Mount Lemmon	Mount Lemmon Survey	·	1.6 km	MPC · JPL
602482	2014 KF_{60}	—	May 24, 2014	Haleakala	Pan-STARRS 1	·	1.9 km	MPC · JPL
602483	2014 KE_{65}	—	May 21, 2014	Haleakala	Pan-STARRS 1	·	800 m	MPC · JPL
602484	2014 KN_{65}	—	February 29, 2008	Mount Lemmon	Mount Lemmon Survey	·	1.4 km	MPC · JPL
602485	2014 KB_{66}	—	August 30, 2005	Palomar	NEAT	EOS	2.1 km	MPC · JPL
602486	2014 KU_{67}	—	May 22, 2014	Mount Lemmon	Mount Lemmon Survey	·	1.1 km	MPC · JPL
602487	2014 KW_{67}	—	May 22, 2014	Mount Lemmon	Mount Lemmon Survey	·	2.3 km	MPC · JPL
602488	2014 KQ_{68}	—	October 3, 2006	Mount Lemmon	Mount Lemmon Survey	·	1.3 km	MPC · JPL
602489	2014 KD_{70}	—	September 10, 2010	Mount Lemmon	Mount Lemmon Survey	EOS	1.2 km	MPC · JPL
602490	2014 KW_{71}	—	August 26, 2009	Catalina	CSS	·	2.4 km	MPC · JPL
602491	2014 KM_{72}	—	February 14, 2013	Haleakala	Pan-STARRS 1	EOS	1.3 km	MPC · JPL
602492	2014 KZ_{72}	—	October 9, 2005	Kitt Peak	Spacewatch	·	1.8 km	MPC · JPL
602493	2014 KG_{73}	—	May 2, 2014	Mount Lemmon	Mount Lemmon Survey	EOS	1.5 km	MPC · JPL
602494	2014 KR_{74}	—	May 7, 2014	Haleakala	Pan-STARRS 1	·	2.0 km	MPC · JPL
602495	2014 KC_{76}	—	December 31, 2007	Kitt Peak	Spacewatch	H	400 m	MPC · JPL
602496	2014 KN_{80}	—	March 10, 2003	Kitt Peak	Spacewatch	·	1.8 km	MPC · JPL
602497	2014 KK_{86}	—	May 10, 2014	Haleakala	Pan-STARRS 1	T_{j} (2.93)	3.1 km	MPC · JPL
602498	2014 KW_{87}	—	February 3, 2013	Haleakala	Pan-STARRS 1	·	2.3 km	MPC · JPL
602499	2014 KQ_{89}	—	May 28, 2014	Haleakala	Pan-STARRS 1	EUP	2.0 km	MPC · JPL
602500	2014 KN_{91}	—	May 23, 2014	Haleakala	Pan-STARRS 1	·	1.9 km	MPC · JPL

== 602501–602600 ==
back to top

Designation			Discovery			Properties		Ref
Permanent	Provisional	Named after	Date	Site	Discoverer(s)	Category	Diam.	Ref
602501	2014 KN_{103}	—	May 23, 2014	Haleakala	Pan-STARRS 1	·	1.5 km	MPC · JPL
602502	2014 KS_{104}	—	May 23, 2014	Haleakala	Pan-STARRS 1	·	2.0 km	MPC · JPL
602503	2014 KK_{105}	—	May 21, 2014	Haleakala	Pan-STARRS 1	·	1.4 km	MPC · JPL
602504	2014 KF_{106}	—	May 31, 2014	Haleakala	Pan-STARRS 1	·	2.2 km	MPC · JPL
602505	2014 KF_{108}	—	May 7, 2014	Haleakala	Pan-STARRS 1	·	1.5 km	MPC · JPL
602506	2014 KN_{108}	—	May 21, 2014	Haleakala	Pan-STARRS 1	·	2.3 km	MPC · JPL
602507	2014 KB_{109}	—	November 11, 2010	Mount Lemmon	Mount Lemmon Survey	HYG	2.1 km	MPC · JPL
602508	2014 KE_{111}	—	May 25, 2014	Haleakala	Pan-STARRS 1	·	2.1 km	MPC · JPL
602509	2014 KH_{111}	—	April 25, 2003	Kitt Peak	Spacewatch	·	1.8 km	MPC · JPL
602510	2014 KQ_{113}	—	May 21, 2014	Haleakala	Pan-STARRS 1	·	1.9 km	MPC · JPL
602511	2014 KJ_{117}	—	September 18, 2015	Mount Lemmon	Mount Lemmon Survey	·	1.6 km	MPC · JPL
602512	2014 KK_{117}	—	May 23, 2014	Haleakala	Pan-STARRS 1	EOS	1.3 km	MPC · JPL
602513	2014 KO_{118}	—	May 21, 2014	Haleakala	Pan-STARRS 1	·	1.3 km	MPC · JPL
602514	2014 KA_{119}	—	May 23, 2014	Haleakala	Pan-STARRS 1	·	1.5 km	MPC · JPL
602515	2014 KJ_{120}	—	May 21, 2014	Haleakala	Pan-STARRS 1	·	1.9 km	MPC · JPL
602516	2014 KL_{120}	—	November 6, 2016	Mount Lemmon	Mount Lemmon Survey	·	1.9 km	MPC · JPL
602517	2014 KC_{121}	—	August 21, 2015	Haleakala	Pan-STARRS 1	·	1.8 km	MPC · JPL
602518	2014 KP_{121}	—	May 7, 2014	Haleakala	Pan-STARRS 1	·	1.7 km	MPC · JPL
602519	2014 KK_{131}	—	May 21, 2014	Haleakala	Pan-STARRS 1	·	2.4 km	MPC · JPL
602520	2014 KH_{137}	—	May 23, 2014	Haleakala	Pan-STARRS 1	·	730 m	MPC · JPL
602521	2014 KJ_{140}	—	May 23, 2014	Haleakala	Pan-STARRS 1	·	2.2 km	MPC · JPL
602522	2014 LO_{1}	—	April 30, 2014	Haleakala	Pan-STARRS 1	·	1.5 km	MPC · JPL
602523	2014 LG_{4}	—	May 22, 2014	Mount Lemmon	Mount Lemmon Survey	·	2.1 km	MPC · JPL
602524	2014 LB_{9}	—	October 25, 2011	Haleakala	Pan-STARRS 1	·	1.6 km	MPC · JPL
602525	2014 LO_{11}	—	May 21, 2014	Mount Lemmon	Mount Lemmon Survey	·	1.9 km	MPC · JPL
602526	2014 LQ_{16}	—	June 4, 2014	Mount Lemmon	Mount Lemmon Survey	BRA	1.6 km	MPC · JPL
602527	2014 LV_{17}	—	May 10, 2014	Haleakala	Pan-STARRS 1	·	2.3 km	MPC · JPL
602528	2014 LJ_{18}	—	October 5, 2004	Kitt Peak	Spacewatch	·	1.5 km	MPC · JPL
602529	2014 LG_{19}	—	April 24, 2003	Kitt Peak	Spacewatch	·	2.0 km	MPC · JPL
602530	2014 LN_{19}	—	September 25, 2011	Haleakala	Pan-STARRS 1	·	800 m	MPC · JPL
602531	2014 LH_{21}	—	December 9, 2010	Mount Lemmon	Mount Lemmon Survey	·	5.7 km	MPC · JPL
602532	2014 LW_{25}	—	April 8, 2014	Haleakala	Pan-STARRS 1	H	520 m	MPC · JPL
602533	2014 LA_{26}	—	September 18, 2004	Siding Spring	SSS	T_{j} (2.97) · EUP	4.0 km	MPC · JPL
602534	2014 LK_{30}	—	June 3, 2014	Haleakala	Pan-STARRS 1	·	2.0 km	MPC · JPL
602535	2014 LX_{31}	—	June 4, 2014	Haleakala	Pan-STARRS 1	·	2.2 km	MPC · JPL
602536	2014 LR_{33}	—	February 14, 2013	Nogales	M. Schwartz, P. R. Holvorcem	·	2.7 km	MPC · JPL
602537	2014 LD_{34}	—	June 4, 2014	Haleakala	Pan-STARRS 1	H	290 m	MPC · JPL
602538	2014 LE_{34}	—	June 4, 2014	Haleakala	Pan-STARRS 1	·	3.5 km	MPC · JPL
602539	2014 LB_{35}	—	September 12, 2015	Haleakala	Pan-STARRS 1	·	1.1 km	MPC · JPL
602540	2014 LG_{35}	—	June 5, 2014	Haleakala	Pan-STARRS 1	·	1.5 km	MPC · JPL
602541	2014 LE_{36}	—	June 5, 2014	Haleakala	Pan-STARRS 1	·	1.2 km	MPC · JPL
602542	2014 LK_{36}	—	June 4, 2014	Haleakala	Pan-STARRS 1	EOS	1.5 km	MPC · JPL
602543	2014 ML_{1}	—	April 28, 2014	Haleakala	Pan-STARRS 1	H	390 m	MPC · JPL
602544	2014 MN_{2}	—	June 21, 2011	Kitt Peak	Spacewatch	·	570 m	MPC · JPL
602545	2014 MG_{3}	—	April 10, 2003	Kitt Peak	Spacewatch	·	1.8 km	MPC · JPL
602546	2014 MM_{7}	—	June 19, 2014	Kitt Peak	Spacewatch	·	1.5 km	MPC · JPL
602547	2014 MJ_{8}	—	September 21, 2003	Kitt Peak	Spacewatch	·	2.9 km	MPC · JPL
602548	2014 MS_{10}	—	August 20, 2009	Bergisch Gladbach	W. Bickel	·	3.5 km	MPC · JPL
602549	2014 MD_{13}	—	January 13, 2013	Mount Lemmon	Mount Lemmon Survey	·	2.4 km	MPC · JPL
602550	2014 ME_{14}	—	February 12, 2013	ESA OGS	ESA OGS	EMA	2.6 km	MPC · JPL
602551	2014 MV_{14}	—	July 4, 2005	Kitt Peak	Spacewatch	·	1.3 km	MPC · JPL
602552	2014 MX_{16}	—	June 23, 2014	Mount Lemmon	Mount Lemmon Survey	·	610 m	MPC · JPL
602553	2014 MO_{17}	—	January 18, 2013	Kitt Peak	Spacewatch	·	570 m	MPC · JPL
602554	2014 MH_{21}	—	January 10, 2007	Kitt Peak	Spacewatch	HYG	2.5 km	MPC · JPL
602555	2014 MD_{26}	—	September 25, 2011	Andrushivka	Y. Ivaščenko, Kyrylenko, P.	·	560 m	MPC · JPL
602556	2014 MQ_{29}	—	June 4, 2014	Haleakala	Pan-STARRS 1	·	2.3 km	MPC · JPL
602557	2014 MS_{32}	—	August 17, 2009	Catalina	CSS	·	2.4 km	MPC · JPL
602558	2014 ME_{41}	—	April 10, 2014	Haleakala	Pan-STARRS 1	T_{j} (2.98)	2.7 km	MPC · JPL
602559	2014 MF_{47}	—	February 3, 2012	Mount Lemmon	Mount Lemmon Survey	·	3.3 km	MPC · JPL
602560	2014 MU_{47}	—	March 1, 2008	Kitt Peak	Spacewatch	EOS	1.6 km	MPC · JPL
602561	2014 MZ_{47}	—	May 26, 2014	Haleakala	Pan-STARRS 1	·	2.0 km	MPC · JPL
602562	2014 MJ_{48}	—	May 30, 2014	Haleakala	Pan-STARRS 1	EOS	1.4 km	MPC · JPL
602563	2014 MN_{52}	—	January 2, 2011	Mount Lemmon	Mount Lemmon Survey	·	3.2 km	MPC · JPL
602564	2014 MG_{53}	—	April 3, 2013	Mount Lemmon	Mount Lemmon Survey	LIX	2.6 km	MPC · JPL
602565	2014 MT_{55}	—	June 27, 2014	Haleakala	Pan-STARRS 1	URS	3.1 km	MPC · JPL
602566	2014 MW_{55}	—	March 31, 2008	Mount Lemmon	Mount Lemmon Survey	·	1.8 km	MPC · JPL
602567	2014 MW_{62}	—	June 28, 2014	Kitt Peak	Spacewatch	TIR	1.9 km	MPC · JPL
602568	2014 MS_{64}	—	March 18, 2007	Mount Nyukasa	Japan Aerospace Exploration Agency	·	4.5 km	MPC · JPL
602569	2014 MF_{65}	—	May 7, 2014	Haleakala	Pan-STARRS 1	·	1.7 km	MPC · JPL
602570	2014 MZ_{65}	—	July 4, 2014	Haleakala	Pan-STARRS 1	·	2.4 km	MPC · JPL
602571	2014 MM_{68}	—	November 24, 2002	Palomar	NEAT	·	1.7 km	MPC · JPL
602572	2014 MD_{70}	—	June 28, 2014	Haleakala	Pan-STARRS 1	SDO	146 km	MPC · JPL
602573	2014 MU_{72}	—	June 21, 2014	Haleakala	Pan-STARRS 1	·	2.8 km	MPC · JPL
602574	2014 MH_{74}	—	May 3, 2008	Kitt Peak	Spacewatch	LIX	2.3 km	MPC · JPL
602575	2014 MX_{78}	—	April 23, 2007	Kitt Peak	Spacewatch	·	510 m	MPC · JPL
602576	2014 MR_{79}	—	June 29, 2014	Haleakala	Pan-STARRS 1	·	2.9 km	MPC · JPL
602577	2014 MF_{84}	—	April 3, 2008	Mount Lemmon	Mount Lemmon Survey	·	1.8 km	MPC · JPL
602578	2014 ML_{84}	—	January 2, 2016	Mount Lemmon	Mount Lemmon Survey	H	420 m	MPC · JPL
602579	2014 MF_{87}	—	April 12, 2013	Haleakala	Pan-STARRS 1	·	2.5 km	MPC · JPL
602580	2014 MO_{87}	—	June 30, 2014	Haleakala	Pan-STARRS 1	·	2.8 km	MPC · JPL
602581	2014 MF_{88}	—	June 30, 2014	Haleakala	Pan-STARRS 1	·	1.7 km	MPC · JPL
602582	2014 MY_{89}	—	June 29, 2014	Haleakala	Pan-STARRS 1	·	2.5 km	MPC · JPL
602583	2014 MM_{90}	—	June 24, 2014	Haleakala	Pan-STARRS 1	·	2.0 km	MPC · JPL
602584	2014 MT_{90}	—	June 27, 2014	Haleakala	Pan-STARRS 1	·	1.4 km	MPC · JPL
602585	2014 MH_{91}	—	June 24, 2014	Haleakala	Pan-STARRS 1	EOS	1.5 km	MPC · JPL
602586	2014 MC_{94}	—	June 29, 2014	Haleakala	Pan-STARRS 1	EOS	1.3 km	MPC · JPL
602587	2014 MO_{97}	—	June 27, 2014	Haleakala	Pan-STARRS 1	EOS	1.6 km	MPC · JPL
602588	2014 NB	—	February 23, 2014	Mount Lemmon	Mount Lemmon Survey	EUP	2.9 km	MPC · JPL
602589	2014 NR_{10}	—	December 31, 2011	Kitt Peak	Spacewatch	VER	2.2 km	MPC · JPL
602590	2014 NL_{11}	—	June 4, 2014	Haleakala	Pan-STARRS 1	·	2.6 km	MPC · JPL
602591	2014 NV_{16}	—	May 28, 2014	Mount Lemmon	Mount Lemmon Survey	H	400 m	MPC · JPL
602592	2014 NA_{20}	—	September 16, 2003	Kitt Peak	Spacewatch	·	4.0 km	MPC · JPL
602593	2014 NE_{27}	—	July 2, 2014	Haleakala	Pan-STARRS 1	·	2.7 km	MPC · JPL
602594	2014 NJ_{27}	—	November 30, 2005	Kitt Peak	Spacewatch	·	2.6 km	MPC · JPL
602595	2014 NU_{29}	—	June 23, 2014	Kitt Peak	Spacewatch	·	2.1 km	MPC · JPL
602596	2014 NX_{35}	—	July 2, 2014	Haleakala	Pan-STARRS 1	THB	2.4 km	MPC · JPL
602597	2014 NM_{36}	—	July 2, 2014	Haleakala	Pan-STARRS 1	THB	1.7 km	MPC · JPL
602598	2014 NL_{38}	—	October 28, 2010	Mount Lemmon	Mount Lemmon Survey	·	3.0 km	MPC · JPL
602599	2014 NP_{39}	—	October 27, 2005	Kitt Peak	Spacewatch	·	2.8 km	MPC · JPL
602600	2014 NV_{41}	—	April 16, 2013	Cerro Tololo-DECam	DECam	·	2.1 km	MPC · JPL

== 602601–602700 ==
back to top

Designation			Discovery			Properties		Ref
Permanent	Provisional	Named after	Date	Site	Discoverer(s)	Category	Diam.	Ref
602601	2014 NQ_{43}	—	July 3, 2014	Haleakala	Pan-STARRS 1	PHO	690 m	MPC · JPL
602602	2014 NK_{46}	—	July 1, 2014	Haleakala	Pan-STARRS 1	EUN	870 m	MPC · JPL
602603	2014 NF_{47}	—	March 14, 2013	Kitt Peak	Spacewatch	TIR	1.8 km	MPC · JPL
602604	2014 NL_{51}	—	January 19, 2012	Kitt Peak	Spacewatch	·	2.3 km	MPC · JPL
602605	2014 NE_{53}	—	April 30, 1997	Kitt Peak	Spacewatch	·	4.2 km	MPC · JPL
602606	2014 NG_{53}	—	July 26, 2005	Palomar	NEAT	·	2.9 km	MPC · JPL
602607	2014 NE_{58}	—	May 2, 2013	Kitt Peak	Spacewatch	·	2.8 km	MPC · JPL
602608	2014 NU_{60}	—	July 6, 2014	Haleakala	Pan-STARRS 1	·	2.5 km	MPC · JPL
602609	2014 NZ_{69}	—	July 2, 2014	Haleakala	Pan-STARRS 1	VER	2.0 km	MPC · JPL
602610	2014 NN_{72}	—	July 8, 2014	Haleakala	Pan-STARRS 1	NAE	1.8 km	MPC · JPL
602611	2014 ND_{73}	—	July 10, 2014	Haleakala	Pan-STARRS 1	·	2.2 km	MPC · JPL
602612	2014 NR_{73}	—	July 8, 2014	Haleakala	Pan-STARRS 1	EUP	3.3 km	MPC · JPL
602613	2014 NK_{77}	—	July 7, 2014	Haleakala	Pan-STARRS 1	LIX	2.3 km	MPC · JPL
602614	2014 NX_{79}	—	July 8, 2014	Haleakala	Pan-STARRS 1	·	2.2 km	MPC · JPL
602615	2014 NG_{81}	—	July 1, 2014	Haleakala	Pan-STARRS 1	·	1.2 km	MPC · JPL
602616	2014 NY_{81}	—	July 2, 2014	Haleakala	Pan-STARRS 1	·	2.9 km	MPC · JPL
602617	2014 NB_{82}	—	July 1, 2014	Haleakala	Pan-STARRS 1	·	2.2 km	MPC · JPL
602618	2014 NC_{88}	—	July 4, 2014	Haleakala	Pan-STARRS 1	·	1.2 km	MPC · JPL
602619	2014 ON_{3}	—	October 3, 2011	Taunus	Karge, S., Zimmer, U.	·	540 m	MPC · JPL
602620	2014 OC_{6}	—	July 26, 2014	Elena Remote	Oreshko, A.	THB	2.3 km	MPC · JPL
602621	2014 OD_{19}	—	January 13, 2008	Mount Lemmon	Mount Lemmon Survey	·	1.1 km	MPC · JPL
602622	2014 OG_{24}	—	November 14, 2010	Mount Lemmon	Mount Lemmon Survey	·	2.2 km	MPC · JPL
602623	2014 OE_{25}	—	April 7, 2013	Mount Lemmon	Mount Lemmon Survey	·	1.5 km	MPC · JPL
602624	2014 OW_{25}	—	April 17, 2013	Haleakala	Pan-STARRS 1	·	2.6 km	MPC · JPL
602625	2014 OS_{27}	—	July 25, 2014	Haleakala	Pan-STARRS 1	·	850 m	MPC · JPL
602626	2014 ON_{29}	—	July 25, 2014	Haleakala	Pan-STARRS 1	HYG	2.5 km	MPC · JPL
602627	2014 OJ_{38}	—	July 7, 2014	Haleakala	Pan-STARRS 1	·	3.3 km	MPC · JPL
602628	2014 OD_{43}	—	July 25, 2014	Haleakala	Pan-STARRS 1	·	500 m	MPC · JPL
602629	2014 OM_{47}	—	June 27, 2014	Haleakala	Pan-STARRS 1	·	2.4 km	MPC · JPL
602630	2014 OA_{53}	—	November 7, 2010	Mount Lemmon	Mount Lemmon Survey	THM	1.8 km	MPC · JPL
602631	2014 OF_{55}	—	February 20, 2006	Mount Lemmon	Mount Lemmon Survey	·	3.3 km	MPC · JPL
602632	2014 OQ_{55}	—	January 7, 2006	Mount Lemmon	Mount Lemmon Survey	·	2.9 km	MPC · JPL
602633	2014 OC_{59}	—	April 15, 2010	Mount Lemmon	Mount Lemmon Survey	·	820 m	MPC · JPL
602634	2014 OG_{60}	—	July 25, 2014	Haleakala	Pan-STARRS 1	URS	2.7 km	MPC · JPL
602635	2014 OR_{63}	—	July 25, 2014	Haleakala	Pan-STARRS 1	·	450 m	MPC · JPL
602636	2014 OG_{64}	—	July 25, 2014	Haleakala	Pan-STARRS 1	·	2.3 km	MPC · JPL
602637	2014 OD_{70}	—	June 24, 2014	Haleakala	Pan-STARRS 1	LIX	2.6 km	MPC · JPL
602638	2014 OL_{74}	—	November 30, 2011	Mount Lemmon	Mount Lemmon Survey	TEL	1.4 km	MPC · JPL
602639	2014 OW_{75}	—	October 28, 2008	Kitt Peak	Spacewatch	·	580 m	MPC · JPL
602640	2014 OC_{76}	—	September 4, 2011	Haleakala	Pan-STARRS 1	·	500 m	MPC · JPL
602641	2014 OO_{76}	—	May 25, 2014	Haleakala	Pan-STARRS 1	·	1.8 km	MPC · JPL
602642	2014 OD_{78}	—	September 2, 2010	Mount Lemmon	Mount Lemmon Survey	·	1.5 km	MPC · JPL
602643	2014 OF_{81}	—	July 27, 2009	Kitt Peak	Spacewatch	·	2.7 km	MPC · JPL
602644	2014 OK_{85}	—	May 9, 2014	Haleakala	Pan-STARRS 1	LIX	2.8 km	MPC · JPL
602645	2014 OQ_{90}	—	February 14, 2012	Haleakala	Pan-STARRS 1	VER	2.0 km	MPC · JPL
602646	2014 OF_{95}	—	October 9, 2004	Kitt Peak	Spacewatch	·	470 m	MPC · JPL
602647	2014 OD_{96}	—	October 26, 2011	Haleakala	Pan-STARRS 1	·	520 m	MPC · JPL
602648	2014 OR_{98}	—	July 24, 2003	Palomar	NEAT	·	3.7 km	MPC · JPL
602649	2014 OX_{104}	—	February 10, 2008	Kitt Peak	Spacewatch	·	1.8 km	MPC · JPL
602650	2014 OT_{107}	—	August 28, 2009	Kitt Peak	Spacewatch	·	2.2 km	MPC · JPL
602651	2014 OW_{108}	—	July 27, 2014	Haleakala	Pan-STARRS 1	·	480 m	MPC · JPL
602652	2014 OG_{113}	—	June 26, 2014	Mount Lemmon	Mount Lemmon Survey	TIR	2.4 km	MPC · JPL
602653	2014 OJ_{113}	—	April 14, 2013	Mount Lemmon	Mount Lemmon Survey	·	2.4 km	MPC · JPL
602654	2014 OV_{120}	—	January 25, 2006	Kitt Peak	Spacewatch	VER	2.3 km	MPC · JPL
602655	2014 OK_{121}	—	July 3, 2014	Haleakala	Pan-STARRS 1	·	2.1 km	MPC · JPL
602656	2014 OO_{129}	—	May 23, 2014	Haleakala	Pan-STARRS 1	·	2.6 km	MPC · JPL
602657	2014 OT_{138}	—	June 26, 2014	Mount Lemmon	Mount Lemmon Survey	·	1.9 km	MPC · JPL
602658	2014 OO_{139}	—	February 12, 2002	Kitt Peak	Spacewatch	·	1.5 km	MPC · JPL
602659	2014 OQ_{139}	—	January 2, 2012	Kitt Peak	Spacewatch	·	2.1 km	MPC · JPL
602660	2014 OG_{147}	—	September 12, 2004	Mauna Kea	P. A. Wiegert, S. Popa	·	1.3 km	MPC · JPL
602661	2014 OY_{150}	—	July 7, 2014	Haleakala	Pan-STARRS 1	·	560 m	MPC · JPL
602662	2014 OT_{155}	—	July 27, 2014	Haleakala	Pan-STARRS 1	·	2.1 km	MPC · JPL
602663	2014 OW_{155}	—	July 27, 2014	Haleakala	Pan-STARRS 1	·	3.3 km	MPC · JPL
602664	2014 OK_{157}	—	July 27, 2014	Haleakala	Pan-STARRS 1	·	1.6 km	MPC · JPL
602665	2014 OD_{158}	—	February 17, 2010	Kitt Peak	Spacewatch	·	1.0 km	MPC · JPL
602666	2014 ON_{159}	—	July 27, 2014	Haleakala	Pan-STARRS 1	·	2.3 km	MPC · JPL
602667	2014 OX_{159}	—	December 23, 2012	Haleakala	Pan-STARRS 1	·	560 m	MPC · JPL
602668	2014 OC_{163}	—	August 17, 2006	Palomar	NEAT	H	600 m	MPC · JPL
602669	2014 OW_{163}	—	February 21, 2012	Kitt Peak	Spacewatch	EOS	1.5 km	MPC · JPL
602670	2014 OA_{166}	—	March 14, 2013	Kitt Peak	Spacewatch	HYG	2.2 km	MPC · JPL
602671	2014 OC_{172}	—	July 27, 2014	Haleakala	Pan-STARRS 1	·	3.1 km	MPC · JPL
602672	2014 OC_{182}	—	September 23, 2011	Haleakala	Pan-STARRS 1	·	570 m	MPC · JPL
602673	2014 OY_{189}	—	July 27, 2014	Haleakala	Pan-STARRS 1	MAS	740 m	MPC · JPL
602674	2014 OD_{195}	—	April 19, 2009	Kitt Peak	Spacewatch	V	760 m	MPC · JPL
602675	2014 OG_{196}	—	August 19, 2006	Kitt Peak	Spacewatch	·	640 m	MPC · JPL
602676	2014 OP_{201}	—	February 2, 2009	Kitt Peak	Spacewatch	·	780 m	MPC · JPL
602677	2014 OA_{209}	—	September 5, 2008	Kitt Peak	Spacewatch	·	540 m	MPC · JPL
602678	2014 OQ_{209}	—	November 13, 2010	Mount Lemmon	Mount Lemmon Survey	·	2.8 km	MPC · JPL
602679	2014 OJ_{212}	—	May 10, 2014	Kitt Peak	Spacewatch	TIR	2.2 km	MPC · JPL
602680	2014 OR_{212}	—	February 21, 2007	Mount Lemmon	Mount Lemmon Survey	·	2.6 km	MPC · JPL
602681	2014 OT_{217}	—	August 27, 2009	Kitt Peak	Spacewatch	·	2.8 km	MPC · JPL
602682	2014 OC_{226}	—	January 19, 2012	Kitt Peak	Spacewatch	EUP	4.0 km	MPC · JPL
602683	2014 OE_{227}	—	July 27, 2014	Haleakala	Pan-STARRS 1	·	3.4 km	MPC · JPL
602684	2014 OQ_{234}	—	March 13, 2013	Nogales	M. Schwartz, P. R. Holvorcem	EUP	2.6 km	MPC · JPL
602685	2014 OQ_{237}	—	February 19, 2013	Nogales	M. Schwartz, P. R. Holvorcem	TIR	2.9 km	MPC · JPL
602686	2014 OR_{250}	—	June 1, 2002	Palomar	NEAT	·	4.6 km	MPC · JPL
602687	2014 OZ_{251}	—	June 27, 2014	Haleakala	Pan-STARRS 1	·	2.8 km	MPC · JPL
602688	2014 OB_{252}	—	June 29, 2014	Haleakala	Pan-STARRS 1	EOS	1.3 km	MPC · JPL
602689	2014 OE_{252}	—	January 14, 2012	Kitt Peak	Spacewatch	T_{j} (2.93)	4.0 km	MPC · JPL
602690	2014 OO_{252}	—	January 14, 2012	Mount Lemmon	Mount Lemmon Survey	·	2.9 km	MPC · JPL
602691	2014 OL_{256}	—	October 16, 2003	Kitt Peak	Spacewatch	·	1.3 km	MPC · JPL
602692	2014 OO_{270}	—	December 2, 2010	Mount Lemmon	Mount Lemmon Survey	·	2.7 km	MPC · JPL
602693	2014 OL_{271}	—	December 3, 2010	Mount Lemmon	Mount Lemmon Survey	·	1.4 km	MPC · JPL
602694	2014 OC_{272}	—	July 29, 2014	Haleakala	Pan-STARRS 1	VER	2.3 km	MPC · JPL
602695	2014 OJ_{283}	—	July 29, 2014	Haleakala	Pan-STARRS 1	·	1.7 km	MPC · JPL
602696	2014 OJ_{291}	—	April 11, 2013	Kitt Peak	Spacewatch	EMA	2.3 km	MPC · JPL
602697	2014 OQ_{293}	—	July 29, 2014	Haleakala	Pan-STARRS 1	·	720 m	MPC · JPL
602698	2014 OX_{293}	—	April 28, 2003	Apache Point	SDSS Collaboration	·	1.7 km	MPC · JPL
602699	2014 OG_{334}	—	January 20, 2012	Haleakala	Pan-STARRS 1	EUP	4.3 km	MPC · JPL
602700	2014 OJ_{340}	—	March 15, 2012	Mount Lemmon	Mount Lemmon Survey	·	3.1 km	MPC · JPL

== 602701–602800 ==
back to top

Designation			Discovery			Properties		Ref
Permanent	Provisional	Named after	Date	Site	Discoverer(s)	Category	Diam.	Ref
602701	2014 OV_{342}	—	February 3, 2012	Mount Lemmon	Mount Lemmon Survey	·	2.7 km	MPC · JPL
602702	2014 OU_{345}	—	September 17, 2003	Palomar	NEAT	LUT	5.4 km	MPC · JPL
602703	2014 OX_{348}	—	July 2, 2014	Haleakala	Pan-STARRS 1	·	2.9 km	MPC · JPL
602704	2014 OD_{350}	—	September 17, 2009	Mount Lemmon	Mount Lemmon Survey	HYG	2.4 km	MPC · JPL
602705	2014 OM_{353}	—	April 12, 2013	Haleakala	Pan-STARRS 1	·	2.7 km	MPC · JPL
602706	2014 OK_{357}	—	June 29, 2014	Haleakala	Pan-STARRS 1	·	2.8 km	MPC · JPL
602707	2014 OF_{361}	—	January 20, 2012	Mount Lemmon	Mount Lemmon Survey	·	2.3 km	MPC · JPL
602708	2014 OV_{365}	—	September 26, 2011	Kitt Peak	Spacewatch	·	590 m	MPC · JPL
602709	2014 OM_{369}	—	May 8, 2013	Haleakala	Pan-STARRS 1	·	2.5 km	MPC · JPL
602710	2014 OU_{375}	—	January 5, 2013	Kitt Peak	Spacewatch	H	380 m	MPC · JPL
602711	2014 OA_{378}	—	July 25, 2014	Haleakala	Pan-STARRS 1	·	2.2 km	MPC · JPL
602712	2014 OW_{384}	—	November 15, 2010	Mount Lemmon	Mount Lemmon Survey	·	3.3 km	MPC · JPL
602713	2014 OX_{384}	—	July 28, 2014	Haleakala	Pan-STARRS 1	·	3.2 km	MPC · JPL
602714	2014 ON_{394}	—	July 25, 2014	Haleakala	Pan-STARRS 1	SDO	112 km	MPC · JPL
602715	2014 OO_{394}	—	July 26, 2014	Haleakala	Pan-STARRS 1	SDO	119 km	MPC · JPL
602716	2014 OP_{394}	—	July 27, 2014	Haleakala	Pan-STARRS 1	SDO	228 km	MPC · JPL
602717	2014 OT_{396}	—	November 11, 2009	Mount Lemmon	Mount Lemmon Survey	·	1.5 km	MPC · JPL
602718	2014 OK_{398}	—	July 31, 2014	Haleakala	Pan-STARRS 1	·	1.9 km	MPC · JPL
602719	2014 OP_{408}	—	December 8, 2010	Mount Lemmon	Mount Lemmon Survey	·	2.2 km	MPC · JPL
602720	2014 OM_{413}	—	December 31, 2011	Kitt Peak	Spacewatch	·	1.2 km	MPC · JPL
602721	2014 OF_{432}	—	July 28, 2014	Haleakala	Pan-STARRS 1	·	2.1 km	MPC · JPL
602722	2014 OZ_{434}	—	July 25, 2014	Haleakala	Pan-STARRS 1	·	500 m	MPC · JPL
602723	2014 OV_{442}	—	July 29, 2014	Haleakala	Pan-STARRS 1	EOS	1.4 km	MPC · JPL
602724	2014 OD_{443}	—	July 28, 2014	Haleakala	Pan-STARRS 1	·	2.1 km	MPC · JPL
602725	2014 PM_{1}	—	November 25, 2005	Mount Lemmon	Mount Lemmon Survey	·	550 m	MPC · JPL
602726	2014 PV_{1}	—	December 16, 1993	Kitt Peak	Spacewatch	·	3.0 km	MPC · JPL
602727	2014 PX_{6}	—	September 23, 2011	Haleakala	Pan-STARRS 1	·	590 m	MPC · JPL
602728	2014 PA_{23}	—	December 22, 2008	Kitt Peak	Spacewatch	·	490 m	MPC · JPL
602729	2014 PA_{26}	—	March 18, 2001	Kitt Peak	Spacewatch	EMA	3.4 km	MPC · JPL
602730	2014 PQ_{41}	—	April 14, 2005	Catalina	CSS	·	1.1 km	MPC · JPL
602731	2014 PU_{43}	—	August 4, 2014	Haleakala	Pan-STARRS 1	·	3.1 km	MPC · JPL
602732	2014 PU_{46}	—	September 15, 2007	Mount Lemmon	Mount Lemmon Survey	·	820 m	MPC · JPL
602733	2014 PZ_{47}	—	July 25, 2014	Haleakala	Pan-STARRS 1	·	2.0 km	MPC · JPL
602734	2014 PZ_{49}	—	August 18, 2009	Kitt Peak	Spacewatch	·	1.4 km	MPC · JPL
602735	2014 PA_{53}	—	July 28, 2014	Haleakala	Pan-STARRS 1	·	2.7 km	MPC · JPL
602736	2014 PC_{60}	—	May 7, 2014	Haleakala	Pan-STARRS 1	·	2.4 km	MPC · JPL
602737	2014 PL_{61}	—	May 11, 2008	Mount Lemmon	Mount Lemmon Survey	·	2.5 km	MPC · JPL
602738	2014 PT_{65}	—	January 17, 2013	Haleakala	Pan-STARRS 1	·	590 m	MPC · JPL
602739	2014 PS_{66}	—	May 22, 2001	Cerro Tololo	Deep Ecliptic Survey	·	430 m	MPC · JPL
602740	2014 PX_{67}	—	February 1, 2005	Catalina	CSS	H	420 m	MPC · JPL
602741	2014 PX_{73}	—	November 23, 2009	Mount Lemmon	Mount Lemmon Survey	·	2.3 km	MPC · JPL
602742	2014 PH_{76}	—	January 5, 2006	Kitt Peak	Spacewatch	·	500 m	MPC · JPL
602743	2014 PU_{79}	—	April 25, 2007	Kitt Peak	Spacewatch	·	500 m	MPC · JPL
602744	2014 PY_{80}	—	January 22, 2006	Mount Lemmon	Mount Lemmon Survey	VER	2.6 km	MPC · JPL
602745	2014 PP_{82}	—	November 26, 2017	Mount Lemmon	Mount Lemmon Survey	·	2.5 km	MPC · JPL
602746	2014 PY_{93}	—	August 3, 2014	Haleakala	Pan-STARRS 1	·	2.4 km	MPC · JPL
602747	2014 PL_{98}	—	August 5, 2014	Haleakala	Pan-STARRS 1	·	500 m	MPC · JPL
602748	2014 QD_{6}	—	August 18, 2014	Haleakala	Pan-STARRS 1	·	2.0 km	MPC · JPL
602749	2014 QJ_{8}	—	September 30, 2009	Mount Lemmon	Mount Lemmon Survey	·	2.6 km	MPC · JPL
602750	2014 QJ_{14}	—	December 14, 2004	Socorro	LINEAR	TIR	3.5 km	MPC · JPL
602751	2014 QW_{14}	—	April 22, 2007	Mount Lemmon	Mount Lemmon Survey	·	3.4 km	MPC · JPL
602752	2014 QA_{38}	—	November 30, 2007	Kitami	K. Endate	·	1.2 km	MPC · JPL
602753	2014 QX_{38}	—	February 27, 2012	Haleakala	Pan-STARRS 1	·	2.4 km	MPC · JPL
602754	2014 QQ_{39}	—	July 3, 2014	Haleakala	Pan-STARRS 1	(895)	2.6 km	MPC · JPL
602755	2014 QF_{40}	—	September 14, 2002	Palomar	NEAT	·	2.6 km	MPC · JPL
602756	2014 QY_{40}	—	January 20, 2012	Haleakala	Pan-STARRS 1	·	3.3 km	MPC · JPL
602757	2014 QC_{43}	—	February 14, 2013	Haleakala	Pan-STARRS 1	·	2.5 km	MPC · JPL
602758	2014 QK_{43}	—	November 5, 2010	Mount Lemmon	Mount Lemmon Survey	·	2.3 km	MPC · JPL
602759	2014 QJ_{44}	—	February 1, 2012	Mount Lemmon	Mount Lemmon Survey	·	2.7 km	MPC · JPL
602760	2014 QK_{45}	—	July 28, 2014	Haleakala	Pan-STARRS 1	·	2.5 km	MPC · JPL
602761	2014 QC_{52}	—	April 14, 2013	ESA OGS	ESA OGS	·	2.1 km	MPC · JPL
602762	2014 QU_{56}	—	September 22, 2009	Mount Lemmon	Mount Lemmon Survey	·	3.1 km	MPC · JPL
602763	2014 QD_{57}	—	September 28, 2008	Mount Lemmon	Mount Lemmon Survey	·	900 m	MPC · JPL
602764	2014 QC_{61}	—	March 15, 2012	Mount Lemmon	Mount Lemmon Survey	VER	2.3 km	MPC · JPL
602765	2014 QJ_{64}	—	August 4, 2003	Kitt Peak	Spacewatch	URS	2.3 km	MPC · JPL
602766	2014 QU_{66}	—	July 26, 2014	Haleakala	Pan-STARRS 1	·	2.3 km	MPC · JPL
602767	2014 QC_{72}	—	April 15, 2013	Haleakala	Pan-STARRS 1	·	1.7 km	MPC · JPL
602768	2014 QR_{72}	—	June 3, 2014	Haleakala	Pan-STARRS 1	·	3.4 km	MPC · JPL
602769	2014 QT_{73}	—	October 13, 2010	Mount Lemmon	Mount Lemmon Survey	·	2.2 km	MPC · JPL
602770	2014 QC_{78}	—	August 20, 2014	Haleakala	Pan-STARRS 1	·	2.2 km	MPC · JPL
602771	2014 QB_{88}	—	September 30, 2003	Kitt Peak	Spacewatch	·	2.7 km	MPC · JPL
602772	2014 QP_{91}	—	February 15, 2013	Haleakala	Pan-STARRS 1	·	520 m	MPC · JPL
602773	2014 QF_{94}	—	January 28, 2011	Mount Lemmon	Mount Lemmon Survey	·	3.0 km	MPC · JPL
602774	2014 QU_{98}	—	September 28, 1998	Kitt Peak	Spacewatch	·	1.8 km	MPC · JPL
602775	2014 QZ_{99}	—	July 30, 2014	Kitt Peak	Spacewatch	·	450 m	MPC · JPL
602776	2014 QU_{102}	—	January 9, 2006	Mount Lemmon	Mount Lemmon Survey	·	3.0 km	MPC · JPL
602777	2014 QR_{108}	—	September 14, 2007	Mount Lemmon	Mount Lemmon Survey	·	910 m	MPC · JPL
602778	2014 QH_{121}	—	March 7, 2013	Mount Lemmon	Mount Lemmon Survey	·	540 m	MPC · JPL
602779	2014 QP_{124}	—	August 20, 2014	Haleakala	Pan-STARRS 1	·	440 m	MPC · JPL
602780	2014 QZ_{130}	—	August 24, 2003	Cerro Tololo	Deep Ecliptic Survey	·	740 m	MPC · JPL
602781	2014 QQ_{132}	—	August 20, 2014	Haleakala	Pan-STARRS 1	·	1.0 km	MPC · JPL
602782	2014 QJ_{146}	—	August 22, 2004	Kitt Peak	Spacewatch	KOR	1.3 km	MPC · JPL
602783	2014 QL_{157}	—	June 27, 2014	Haleakala	Pan-STARRS 1	·	2.7 km	MPC · JPL
602784	2014 QL_{158}	—	March 19, 2013	Haleakala	Pan-STARRS 1	·	2.0 km	MPC · JPL
602785	2014 QS_{160}	—	April 17, 2013	Haleakala	Pan-STARRS 1	·	2.4 km	MPC · JPL
602786	2014 QP_{161}	—	March 13, 2007	Kitt Peak	Spacewatch	·	580 m	MPC · JPL
602787	2014 QG_{164}	—	June 27, 2014	Haleakala	Pan-STARRS 1	·	2.0 km	MPC · JPL
602788	2014 QR_{168}	—	July 23, 2003	Palomar	NEAT	H	640 m	MPC · JPL
602789	2014 QB_{179}	—	February 5, 2011	Mount Lemmon	Mount Lemmon Survey	·	1.8 km	MPC · JPL
602790	2014 QS_{189}	—	August 22, 2014	Haleakala	Pan-STARRS 1	·	2.3 km	MPC · JPL
602791	2014 QS_{191}	—	September 26, 2008	Kitt Peak	Spacewatch	·	520 m	MPC · JPL
602792	2014 QC_{208}	—	September 30, 2011	Kitt Peak	Spacewatch	·	410 m	MPC · JPL
602793	2014 QK_{215}	—	September 18, 2003	Palomar	NEAT	·	3.8 km	MPC · JPL
602794	2014 QP_{225}	—	August 27, 2009	Kitt Peak	Spacewatch	EOS	1.5 km	MPC · JPL
602795	2014 QB_{247}	—	August 22, 2014	Haleakala	Pan-STARRS 1	·	2.0 km	MPC · JPL
602796	2014 QE_{250}	—	August 22, 2014	Haleakala	Pan-STARRS 1	·	520 m	MPC · JPL
602797	2014 QF_{253}	—	August 22, 2014	Haleakala	Pan-STARRS 1	·	2.8 km	MPC · JPL
602798	2014 QS_{256}	—	August 22, 2014	Haleakala	Pan-STARRS 1	·	3.0 km	MPC · JPL
602799	2014 QD_{258}	—	January 10, 2011	Mount Lemmon	Mount Lemmon Survey	·	2.6 km	MPC · JPL
602800	2014 QX_{270}	—	November 10, 2010	Mount Lemmon	Mount Lemmon Survey	EOS	2.0 km	MPC · JPL

== 602801–602900 ==
back to top

Designation			Discovery			Properties		Ref
Permanent	Provisional	Named after	Date	Site	Discoverer(s)	Category	Diam.	Ref
602801	2014 QN_{275}	—	August 24, 2014	Kitt Peak	Spacewatch	THB	2.6 km	MPC · JPL
602802	2014 QZ_{275}	—	October 21, 2011	Kitt Peak	Spacewatch	·	780 m	MPC · JPL
602803	2014 QJ_{276}	—	April 17, 2013	Haleakala	Pan-STARRS 1	VER	2.5 km	MPC · JPL
602804	2014 QG_{277}	—	February 20, 2010	Kitt Peak	Spacewatch	·	590 m	MPC · JPL
602805	2014 QE_{280}	—	January 19, 2012	Kitt Peak	Spacewatch	·	2.9 km	MPC · JPL
602806	2014 QF_{283}	—	December 1, 2005	Mount Lemmon	Mount Lemmon Survey	·	2.3 km	MPC · JPL
602807	2014 QC_{285}	—	September 28, 2003	Apache Point	SDSS Collaboration	·	2.8 km	MPC · JPL
602808	2014 QQ_{285}	—	February 14, 2013	Haleakala	Pan-STARRS 1	·	2.6 km	MPC · JPL
602809	2014 QX_{288}	—	April 21, 2012	Haleakala	Pan-STARRS 1	·	2.8 km	MPC · JPL
602810	2014 QL_{294}	—	August 3, 2014	Haleakala	Pan-STARRS 1	·	2.9 km	MPC · JPL
602811	2014 QT_{294}	—	August 25, 2014	Haleakala	Pan-STARRS 1	·	2.8 km	MPC · JPL
602812	2014 QE_{302}	—	July 28, 2014	Haleakala	Pan-STARRS 1	·	2.2 km	MPC · JPL
602813	2014 QM_{308}	—	March 8, 2013	Haleakala	Pan-STARRS 1	·	610 m	MPC · JPL
602814	2014 QK_{309}	—	September 20, 2009	Mount Lemmon	Mount Lemmon Survey	·	3.0 km	MPC · JPL
602815	2014 QF_{310}	—	September 10, 2009	Catalina	CSS	·	2.6 km	MPC · JPL
602816	2014 QV_{317}	—	February 21, 2007	Mount Lemmon	Mount Lemmon Survey	EOS	1.7 km	MPC · JPL
602817	2014 QH_{321}	—	August 25, 2014	Haleakala	Pan-STARRS 1	AEG	1.8 km	MPC · JPL
602818	2014 QV_{323}	—	March 8, 2013	Haleakala	Pan-STARRS 1	·	670 m	MPC · JPL
602819	2014 QD_{339}	—	July 6, 2014	Haleakala	Pan-STARRS 1	·	1.9 km	MPC · JPL
602820	2014 QF_{341}	—	September 15, 2009	Kitt Peak	Spacewatch	·	2.1 km	MPC · JPL
602821	2014 QC_{348}	—	September 26, 2003	Apache Point	SDSS Collaboration	·	3.5 km	MPC · JPL
602822	2014 QD_{374}	—	August 20, 2014	Haleakala	Pan-STARRS 1	·	590 m	MPC · JPL
602823	2014 QP_{376}	—	August 27, 2014	Haleakala	Pan-STARRS 1	·	2.2 km	MPC · JPL
602824	2014 QN_{399}	—	August 28, 2014	Kitt Peak	Spacewatch	·	2.7 km	MPC · JPL
602825	2014 QZ_{399}	—	February 25, 2007	Mount Lemmon	Mount Lemmon Survey	TIR	3.1 km	MPC · JPL
602826	2014 QD_{403}	—	September 4, 2008	La Sagra	OAM	T_{j} (2.99)	3.3 km	MPC · JPL
602827	2014 QK_{409}	—	October 16, 2009	Mount Lemmon	Mount Lemmon Survey	·	2.5 km	MPC · JPL
602828	2014 QM_{409}	—	March 17, 2013	Palomar	Palomar Transient Factory	·	2.8 km	MPC · JPL
602829	2014 QQ_{429}	—	August 6, 2014	Haleakala	Pan-STARRS 1	·	2.1 km	MPC · JPL
602830	2014 QZ_{433}	—	August 27, 2014	Haleakala	Pan-STARRS 1	·	540 m	MPC · JPL
602831	2014 QT_{438}	—	July 25, 2007	Lulin	LUSS	·	650 m	MPC · JPL
602832	2014 QD_{440}	—	September 21, 2003	Campo Imperatore	CINEOS	·	2.7 km	MPC · JPL
602833	2014 QM_{445}	—	August 22, 2014	Haleakala	Pan-STARRS 1	·	2.2 km	MPC · JPL
602834	2014 QX_{447}	—	January 10, 2006	Mount Lemmon	Mount Lemmon Survey	·	580 m	MPC · JPL
602835	2014 QO_{451}	—	March 6, 2008	Mount Lemmon	Mount Lemmon Survey	·	2.0 km	MPC · JPL
602836	2014 QP_{457}	—	October 23, 2003	Kitt Peak	Spacewatch	V	690 m	MPC · JPL
602837	2014 QV_{474}	—	April 17, 2013	Haleakala	Pan-STARRS 1	·	2.7 km	MPC · JPL
602838	2014 QO_{478}	—	August 20, 2014	Haleakala	Pan-STARRS 1	KOR	1.1 km	MPC · JPL
602839	2014 QL_{486}	—	August 20, 2014	Haleakala	Pan-STARRS 1	·	630 m	MPC · JPL
602840	2014 QD_{495}	—	August 31, 2014	Haleakala	Pan-STARRS 1	·	540 m	MPC · JPL
602841	2014 QT_{497}	—	August 25, 2014	Haleakala	Pan-STARRS 1	·	2.0 km	MPC · JPL
602842	2014 QX_{504}	—	October 24, 2009	Kitt Peak	Spacewatch	·	2.6 km	MPC · JPL
602843	2014 QK_{506}	—	August 20, 2014	Haleakala	Pan-STARRS 1	TIR	2.5 km	MPC · JPL
602844	2014 QK_{526}	—	August 20, 2014	Haleakala	Pan-STARRS 1	·	2.7 km	MPC · JPL
602845	2014 QZ_{528}	—	August 20, 2014	Haleakala	Pan-STARRS 1	·	2.4 km	MPC · JPL
602846	2014 QM_{529}	—	August 28, 2014	Haleakala	Pan-STARRS 1	·	2.4 km	MPC · JPL
602847	2014 QB_{533}	—	August 28, 2014	Haleakala	Pan-STARRS 1	EOS	1.3 km	MPC · JPL
602848	2014 QP_{537}	—	September 16, 2003	Kitt Peak	Spacewatch	·	2.1 km	MPC · JPL
602849	2014 QS_{554}	—	August 25, 2014	Haleakala	Pan-STARRS 1	·	1.0 km	MPC · JPL
602850	2014 QV_{554}	—	August 25, 2014	Haleakala	Pan-STARRS 1	·	890 m	MPC · JPL
602851	2014 RJ_{4}	—	June 28, 2014	Haleakala	Pan-STARRS 1	DOR	2.2 km	MPC · JPL
602852	2014 RJ_{9}	—	June 28, 2014	Haleakala	Pan-STARRS 1	TIR	3.0 km	MPC · JPL
602853	2014 RT_{22}	—	August 28, 2014	Haleakala	Pan-STARRS 1	TIN	740 m	MPC · JPL
602854	2014 RY_{22}	—	January 12, 2003	Palomar	NEAT	·	3.1 km	MPC · JPL
602855	2014 RK_{25}	—	April 18, 2013	Mount Lemmon	Mount Lemmon Survey	·	3.2 km	MPC · JPL
602856	2014 RJ_{33}	—	November 18, 1996	Kitt Peak	Spacewatch	·	900 m	MPC · JPL
602857	2014 RS_{34}	—	July 28, 2014	Haleakala	Pan-STARRS 1	·	1.6 km	MPC · JPL
602858	2014 RT_{37}	—	September 25, 1998	Kitt Peak	Spacewatch	·	1.6 km	MPC · JPL
602859	2014 RE_{43}	—	September 18, 2003	Haleakala	NEAT	·	3.5 km	MPC · JPL
602860	2014 RZ_{51}	—	April 20, 2006	Kitt Peak	Spacewatch	·	1.0 km	MPC · JPL
602861	2014 RB_{54}	—	July 30, 2014	Kitt Peak	Spacewatch	EOS	1.6 km	MPC · JPL
602862	2014 RP_{64}	—	September 15, 2014	Mount Lemmon	Mount Lemmon Survey	·	1.9 km	MPC · JPL
602863	2014 RO_{70}	—	September 2, 2014	Haleakala	Pan-STARRS 1	·	1.2 km	MPC · JPL
602864	2014 RT_{76}	—	September 1, 2014	Mount Lemmon	Mount Lemmon Survey	·	1.4 km	MPC · JPL
602865	2014 SP_{6}	—	January 26, 2006	Kitt Peak	Spacewatch	·	2.2 km	MPC · JPL
602866	2014 SN_{17}	—	April 10, 2013	Haleakala	Pan-STARRS 1	·	490 m	MPC · JPL
602867	2014 SP_{21}	—	January 23, 2006	Kitt Peak	Spacewatch	HYG	2.5 km	MPC · JPL
602868	2014 SS_{29}	—	March 15, 2013	Mount Lemmon	Mount Lemmon Survey	·	590 m	MPC · JPL
602869	2014 SS_{31}	—	February 12, 2011	Mount Lemmon	Mount Lemmon Survey	·	2.8 km	MPC · JPL
602870	2014 SB_{34}	—	January 22, 2006	Mount Lemmon	Mount Lemmon Survey	·	520 m	MPC · JPL
602871	2014 SS_{36}	—	March 12, 2010	Kitt Peak	Spacewatch	·	560 m	MPC · JPL
602872	2014 SG_{38}	—	September 28, 2009	Mount Lemmon	Mount Lemmon Survey	·	3.1 km	MPC · JPL
602873	2014 SK_{38}	—	June 7, 2013	Haleakala	Pan-STARRS 1	EOS	1.6 km	MPC · JPL
602874	2014 SQ_{40}	—	October 16, 2009	Mount Lemmon	Mount Lemmon Survey	EOS	1.5 km	MPC · JPL
602875	2014 SV_{46}	—	October 23, 2011	Mount Lemmon	Mount Lemmon Survey	·	610 m	MPC · JPL
602876	2014 SY_{51}	—	December 4, 2007	Kitt Peak	Spacewatch	NYS	940 m	MPC · JPL
602877	2014 SU_{53}	—	March 6, 2008	Bergisch Gladbach	W. Bickel	·	1.5 km	MPC · JPL
602878	2014 SO_{55}	—	February 7, 2011	Mount Lemmon	Mount Lemmon Survey	·	2.9 km	MPC · JPL
602879	2014 SB_{59}	—	October 28, 2011	Mount Lemmon	Mount Lemmon Survey	·	640 m	MPC · JPL
602880	2014 SL_{60}	—	July 28, 2014	Haleakala	Pan-STARRS 1	·	1.5 km	MPC · JPL
602881	2014 SX_{65}	—	February 11, 2011	Mount Lemmon	Mount Lemmon Survey	·	2.8 km	MPC · JPL
602882	2014 SP_{74}	—	March 18, 2005	Catalina	CSS	·	1.3 km	MPC · JPL
602883	2014 SW_{80}	—	February 13, 2013	ESA OGS	ESA OGS	·	710 m	MPC · JPL
602884	2014 SJ_{85}	—	September 18, 2003	Palomar	NEAT	·	2.3 km	MPC · JPL
602885	2014 SA_{104}	—	August 28, 2014	Kitt Peak	Spacewatch	·	1.2 km	MPC · JPL
602886	2014 SQ_{110}	—	January 26, 2009	Mount Lemmon	Mount Lemmon Survey	(883)	600 m	MPC · JPL
602887	2014 SZ_{111}	—	August 31, 2007	Siding Spring	K. Sárneczky, L. Kiss	·	3.2 km	MPC · JPL
602888	2014 SH_{112}	—	September 18, 2014	Haleakala	Pan-STARRS 1	·	1.9 km	MPC · JPL
602889	2014 SX_{115}	—	December 30, 2007	Kitt Peak	Spacewatch	MAS	610 m	MPC · JPL
602890	2014 SG_{118}	—	March 29, 2011	Mount Lemmon	Mount Lemmon Survey	·	2.7 km	MPC · JPL
602891	2014 SY_{119}	—	January 3, 2012	Kitt Peak	Spacewatch	·	420 m	MPC · JPL
602892	2014 SC_{141}	—	July 31, 2014	Haleakala	Pan-STARRS 1	·	2.0 km	MPC · JPL
602893	2014 SH_{145}	—	January 30, 2011	Haleakala	Pan-STARRS 1	LIX	2.6 km	MPC · JPL
602894	2014 SB_{165}	—	August 19, 2014	Haleakala	Pan-STARRS 1	·	680 m	MPC · JPL
602895	2014 SA_{167}	—	October 22, 2009	Mount Lemmon	Mount Lemmon Survey	·	2.9 km	MPC · JPL
602896	2014 SJ_{168}	—	September 23, 2009	Mount Lemmon	Mount Lemmon Survey	·	2.3 km	MPC · JPL
602897	2014 SZ_{180}	—	June 21, 2007	Kitt Peak	Spacewatch	·	490 m	MPC · JPL
602898	2014 SK_{184}	—	September 25, 1998	Kitt Peak	Spacewatch	·	2.5 km	MPC · JPL
602899	2014 SU_{186}	—	January 31, 2009	Mount Lemmon	Mount Lemmon Survey	·	460 m	MPC · JPL
602900	2014 SS_{187}	—	September 20, 2014	Haleakala	Pan-STARRS 1	·	500 m	MPC · JPL

== 602901–603000 ==
back to top

Designation			Discovery			Properties		Ref
Permanent	Provisional	Named after	Date	Site	Discoverer(s)	Category	Diam.	Ref
602901	2014 SF_{191}	—	October 31, 2005	Mount Lemmon	Mount Lemmon Survey	KOR	1.2 km	MPC · JPL
602902	2014 SX_{194}	—	September 20, 2014	Haleakala	Pan-STARRS 1	615	1.2 km	MPC · JPL
602903	2014 SO_{197}	—	February 17, 2013	Kitt Peak	Spacewatch	·	630 m	MPC · JPL
602904	2014 SG_{199}	—	February 9, 2005	Kitt Peak	Spacewatch	·	2.2 km	MPC · JPL
602905	2014 SH_{202}	—	October 23, 2001	Kitt Peak	Spacewatch	·	670 m	MPC · JPL
602906	2014 SL_{203}	—	November 22, 2011	Mount Lemmon	Mount Lemmon Survey	·	730 m	MPC · JPL
602907	2014 SU_{204}	—	July 30, 2014	Haleakala	Pan-STARRS 1	·	610 m	MPC · JPL
602908	2014 SM_{205}	—	August 27, 2014	Haleakala	Pan-STARRS 1	THM	1.5 km	MPC · JPL
602909	2014 SL_{208}	—	March 16, 2005	Mount Lemmon	Mount Lemmon Survey	VER	2.3 km	MPC · JPL
602910	2014 SM_{208}	—	July 29, 2014	Haleakala	Pan-STARRS 1	·	1.1 km	MPC · JPL
602911	2014 SC_{235}	—	December 31, 2007	Kitt Peak	Spacewatch	·	830 m	MPC · JPL
602912	2014 SU_{238}	—	September 24, 2009	Mount Lemmon	Mount Lemmon Survey	·	2.4 km	MPC · JPL
602913	2014 SN_{240}	—	July 31, 2014	Haleakala	Pan-STARRS 1	·	580 m	MPC · JPL
602914	2014 SH_{247}	—	April 14, 2010	Kitt Peak	Spacewatch	·	730 m	MPC · JPL
602915	2014 SD_{251}	—	October 26, 2011	Haleakala	Pan-STARRS 1	·	580 m	MPC · JPL
602916	2014 SV_{256}	—	September 9, 2007	Kitt Peak	Spacewatch	V	450 m	MPC · JPL
602917	2014 SN_{289}	—	September 19, 2014	Haleakala	Pan-STARRS 1	·	2.1 km	MPC · JPL
602918	2014 SA_{291}	—	January 7, 2006	Kitt Peak	Spacewatch	·	580 m	MPC · JPL
602919	2014 SZ_{309}	—	September 24, 2014	Mount Lemmon	Mount Lemmon Survey	LIX	2.7 km	MPC · JPL
602920	2014 SH_{331}	—	October 8, 2004	Kitt Peak	Spacewatch	·	590 m	MPC · JPL
602921	2014 SW_{333}	—	September 24, 2014	Kitt Peak	Spacewatch	·	2.2 km	MPC · JPL
602922 Juhászgyula	2014 SD_{335}	Juhászgyula	September 30, 2014	Piszkéstető	K. Sárneczky, P. Székely	·	3.5 km	MPC · JPL
602923	2014 SE_{335}	—	August 25, 2014	Haleakala	Pan-STARRS 1	·	590 m	MPC · JPL
602924	2014 SW_{335}	—	September 30, 2009	Mount Lemmon	Mount Lemmon Survey	·	2.4 km	MPC · JPL
602925	2014 SG_{336}	—	October 25, 2011	Haleakala	Pan-STARRS 1	·	630 m	MPC · JPL
602926	2014 SN_{338}	—	October 11, 2007	Mount Lemmon	Mount Lemmon Survey	·	630 m	MPC · JPL
602927	2014 SF_{344}	—	September 29, 2014	Haleakala	Pan-STARRS 1	·	2.7 km	MPC · JPL
602928	2014 SS_{352}	—	September 20, 2014	Haleakala	Pan-STARRS 1	·	820 m	MPC · JPL
602929	2014 SA_{360}	—	September 19, 2014	Haleakala	Pan-STARRS 1	·	2.6 km	MPC · JPL
602930	2014 SY_{364}	—	September 20, 2014	Haleakala	Pan-STARRS 1	·	540 m	MPC · JPL
602931	2014 SZ_{364}	—	November 24, 2014	Mount Lemmon	Mount Lemmon Survey	V	510 m	MPC · JPL
602932	2014 SH_{365}	—	September 24, 2014	Mount Lemmon	Mount Lemmon Survey	PHO	960 m	MPC · JPL
602933	2014 SF_{367}	—	November 27, 2014	Haleakala	Pan-STARRS 1	·	440 m	MPC · JPL
602934	2014 SW_{367}	—	September 19, 2014	Haleakala	Pan-STARRS 1	·	3.2 km	MPC · JPL
602935	2014 SU_{380}	—	September 19, 2014	Haleakala	Pan-STARRS 1	·	600 m	MPC · JPL
602936	2014 SK_{383}	—	September 19, 2014	Haleakala	Pan-STARRS 1	·	520 m	MPC · JPL
602937	2014 SP_{394}	—	September 17, 2014	Haleakala	Pan-STARRS 1	EOS	1.4 km	MPC · JPL
602938	2014 SA_{399}	—	July 5, 2014	Haleakala	Pan-STARRS 1	EUN	1.1 km	MPC · JPL
602939	2014 SP_{399}	—	September 18, 2014	Haleakala	Pan-STARRS 1	·	820 m	MPC · JPL
602940	2014 TB_{2}	—	September 15, 2007	Lulin	LUSS	·	620 m	MPC · JPL
602941	2014 TE_{6}	—	October 21, 2003	Kitt Peak	Spacewatch	EOS	2.5 km	MPC · JPL
602942	2014 TX_{8}	—	July 31, 2000	Cerro Tololo	Deep Ecliptic Survey	·	460 m	MPC · JPL
602943	2014 TR_{10}	—	October 30, 2009	Mount Lemmon	Mount Lemmon Survey	EOS	2.1 km	MPC · JPL
602944	2014 TM_{15}	—	October 1, 2014	Haleakala	Pan-STARRS 1	·	2.5 km	MPC · JPL
602945	2014 TP_{16}	—	September 18, 2003	Kitt Peak	Spacewatch	·	3.7 km	MPC · JPL
602946	2014 TD_{17}	—	September 4, 2014	Haleakala	Pan-STARRS 1	BAR	910 m	MPC · JPL
602947	2014 TU_{18}	—	October 12, 2007	Kitt Peak	Spacewatch	(2076)	660 m	MPC · JPL
602948	2014 TK_{32}	—	October 3, 2014	Mount Lemmon	Mount Lemmon Survey	HNS	920 m	MPC · JPL
602949	2014 TO_{38}	—	October 13, 2004	Moletai	K. Černis, Zdanavicius, J.	·	700 m	MPC · JPL
602950	2014 TS_{40}	—	March 2, 2005	Kitt Peak	Spacewatch	·	700 m	MPC · JPL
602951	2014 TC_{43}	—	September 28, 2003	Kitt Peak	Spacewatch	EOS	2.0 km	MPC · JPL
602952	2014 TO_{59}	—	March 4, 2006	Mount Lemmon	Mount Lemmon Survey	·	620 m	MPC · JPL
602953	2014 TH_{61}	—	September 14, 2007	Mount Lemmon	Mount Lemmon Survey	·	600 m	MPC · JPL
602954	2014 TB_{64}	—	September 14, 2007	Mount Lemmon	Mount Lemmon Survey	·	510 m	MPC · JPL
602955	2014 TN_{70}	—	January 14, 2002	Palomar	NEAT	·	770 m	MPC · JPL
602956	2014 TK_{79}	—	October 24, 2011	Haleakala	Pan-STARRS 1	·	670 m	MPC · JPL
602957	2014 TK_{95}	—	October 2, 2014	Haleakala	Pan-STARRS 1	·	510 m	MPC · JPL
602958	2014 TF_{98}	—	March 10, 2016	Haleakala	Pan-STARRS 1	·	500 m	MPC · JPL
602959	2014 UT_{4}	—	October 18, 2014	Mount Lemmon	Mount Lemmon Survey	·	1.1 km	MPC · JPL
602960	2014 UA_{41}	—	October 3, 2014	Kitt Peak	Spacewatch	H	410 m	MPC · JPL
602961	2014 UF_{41}	—	October 20, 2014	Mount Lemmon	Mount Lemmon Survey	·	1.7 km	MPC · JPL
602962	2014 UJ_{45}	—	September 12, 2007	Mount Lemmon	Mount Lemmon Survey	·	490 m	MPC · JPL
602963	2014 UX_{48}	—	November 3, 2007	Kitt Peak	Spacewatch	·	860 m	MPC · JPL
602964	2014 UA_{50}	—	November 10, 2001	Socorro	LINEAR	·	1.8 km	MPC · JPL
602965	2014 UT_{53}	—	February 1, 2009	Kitt Peak	Spacewatch	·	630 m	MPC · JPL
602966	2014 UM_{54}	—	October 5, 2014	Mount Lemmon	Mount Lemmon Survey	·	1.3 km	MPC · JPL
602967	2014 UU_{63}	—	October 10, 2007	Mount Lemmon	Mount Lemmon Survey	·	710 m	MPC · JPL
602968	2014 UY_{63}	—	October 22, 2009	Mount Lemmon	Mount Lemmon Survey	·	2.1 km	MPC · JPL
602969	2014 UY_{65}	—	March 3, 2005	Catalina	CSS	·	740 m	MPC · JPL
602970	2014 UZ_{65}	—	October 20, 2014	Mount Lemmon	Mount Lemmon Survey	·	1.2 km	MPC · JPL
602971	2014 UF_{66}	—	April 21, 2012	Mount Lemmon	Mount Lemmon Survey	(5)	1.1 km	MPC · JPL
602972	2014 UK_{71}	—	January 17, 2005	Kitt Peak	Spacewatch	·	920 m	MPC · JPL
602973	2014 UJ_{77}	—	October 13, 2014	Mount Lemmon	Mount Lemmon Survey	·	590 m	MPC · JPL
602974	2014 UV_{78}	—	April 21, 2006	Mount Lemmon	Mount Lemmon Survey	·	2.6 km	MPC · JPL
602975	2014 UA_{84}	—	October 21, 2014	Mount Lemmon	Mount Lemmon Survey	·	1.6 km	MPC · JPL
602976	2014 UW_{87}	—	February 14, 2012	Haleakala	Pan-STARRS 1	V	480 m	MPC · JPL
602977	2014 UD_{89}	—	November 9, 2007	Mount Lemmon	Mount Lemmon Survey	·	810 m	MPC · JPL
602978	2014 UP_{89}	—	September 12, 2007	Mount Lemmon	Mount Lemmon Survey	V	530 m	MPC · JPL
602979	2014 UR_{98}	—	October 23, 2014	Kitt Peak	Spacewatch	·	2.9 km	MPC · JPL
602980	2014 UP_{102}	—	October 10, 2007	Kitt Peak	Spacewatch	V	430 m	MPC · JPL
602981	2014 US_{102}	—	March 15, 2013	Kitt Peak	Spacewatch	·	730 m	MPC · JPL
602982	2014 UU_{106}	—	October 26, 2011	Haleakala	Pan-STARRS 1	·	470 m	MPC · JPL
602983	2014 UY_{109}	—	November 11, 2009	Kitt Peak	Spacewatch	·	2.4 km	MPC · JPL
602984	2014 UJ_{121}	—	September 8, 2007	Andrushivka	Gerashchenko, O.	·	870 m	MPC · JPL
602985	2014 UO_{123}	—	January 16, 2011	Mount Lemmon	Mount Lemmon Survey	·	3.2 km	MPC · JPL
602986	2014 UE_{135}	—	May 20, 2006	Kitt Peak	Spacewatch	·	670 m	MPC · JPL
602987	2014 UB_{147}	—	February 25, 2006	Kitt Peak	Spacewatch	·	480 m	MPC · JPL
602988	2014 US_{148}	—	September 16, 2003	Kitt Peak	Spacewatch	·	1.8 km	MPC · JPL
602989	2014 UU_{150}	—	September 16, 2009	Kitt Peak	Spacewatch	·	1.2 km	MPC · JPL
602990	2014 UB_{159}	—	October 25, 2014	Haleakala	Pan-STARRS 1	T_{j} (2.98) · EUP	3.1 km	MPC · JPL
602991	2014 UG_{165}	—	January 30, 2009	Mount Lemmon	Mount Lemmon Survey	·	720 m	MPC · JPL
602992	2014 UX_{165}	—	May 6, 2006	Kitt Peak	Spacewatch	V	610 m	MPC · JPL
602993	2014 UJ_{166}	—	September 2, 1998	Kitt Peak	Spacewatch	EOS	1.7 km	MPC · JPL
602994	2014 US_{166}	—	October 26, 2014	Mount Lemmon	Mount Lemmon Survey	·	700 m	MPC · JPL
602995	2014 US_{167}	—	October 26, 2014	Mount Lemmon	Mount Lemmon Survey	L5	6.8 km	MPC · JPL
602996	2014 UZ_{167}	—	September 18, 2003	Kitt Peak	Spacewatch	·	900 m	MPC · JPL
602997	2014 UX_{171}	—	October 7, 2005	Mauna Kea	A. Boattini	·	710 m	MPC · JPL
602998	2014 UL_{176}	—	July 23, 2001	Haleakala	NEAT	·	830 m	MPC · JPL
602999	2014 UF_{196}	—	September 13, 2007	Mount Lemmon	Mount Lemmon Survey	V	480 m	MPC · JPL
603000	2014 US_{202}	—	October 28, 2001	Palomar	NEAT	·	2.2 km	MPC · JPL

back to top

== Meaning of names ==
As minor planet discoveries are confirmed, they are given a permanent number by the IAU's Minor Planet Center (MPC), and the discoverers can then submit names for them, following the IAU's naming conventions. The list below concerns those minor planets in the specified number-range that have received names, and explains the meanings of those names.

Official naming citations of newly named small Solar System bodies are approved and published in a bulletin by IAU's Working Group for Small Bodies Nomenclature (WGSBN). Before May 2021, citations were published in MPC's Minor Planet Circulars for many decades. Recent citations can also be found on the JPL Small-Body Database (SBDB). Until his death in 2016, German astronomer Lutz D. Schmadel compiled these citations into the Dictionary of Minor Planet Names (DMP) and regularly updated the collection.

Based on Paul Herget's The Names of the Minor Planets, Schmadel also researched the unclear origin of numerous asteroids, most of which had been named prior to World War II. This article incorporates text from this source, which is in the public domain: SBDB New namings may only be added to this list below after official publication as the preannouncement of names is condemned. The WGSBN publishes a comprehensive guideline for the naming rules of non-cometary small Solar System bodies.

Named minor planet	Provisional	This minor planet was named for...	Ref · Catalog
602922 Juhászgyula	2014 SD_{335}	Gyula Juhász (1883–1937), Hungarian poet, high school teacher and journalist.	IAU · 602922
