= List of minor planets: 850001–851000 =

The following is a partial list of minor planets, running from minor-planet number 850001 through 851000, inclusive. The primary data for this and other partial lists is based on JPL's "Small-Body Orbital Elements" and data available from the Minor Planet Center. Critical list information is also provided by the MPC, unless otherwise specified from Lowell Observatory. A detailed description of the table's columns and additional sources are given on the main page including a complete list of every page in this series, and a statistical break-up on the dynamical classification of minor planets.

Also see the summary list of all named bodies in numerical and alphabetical order, and the corresponding naming citations for the number range of this particular list. New namings may only be added to this list after official publication, as the preannouncement of names is condemned by the Working Group for Small Bodies Nomenclature of the International Astronomical Union.

Near-Earth obj.	MBA (inner)	MBA (outer)	Centaur
Mars-crosser	MBA (middle)	Jupiter trojan	Trans-Neptunian obj.
Unclassified

== 850001–850100 ==
Designation			Discovery			Properties		Ref
Permanent	Provisional	Named after	Date	Site	Discoverer(s)	Category	Diam.	Ref
850001	2006 SK_{172}	—	September 25, 2006	Kitt Peak	Spacewatch	(18466)	1.5 km	MPC · JPL
850002	2006 SG_{174}	—	September 17, 2006	Kitt Peak	Spacewatch	·	490 m	MPC · JPL
850003	2006 SM_{180}	—	September 25, 2006	Mount Lemmon	Mount Lemmon Survey	·	660 m	MPC · JPL
850004	2006 ST_{199}	—	September 24, 2006	Kitt Peak	Spacewatch	NYS	800 m	MPC · JPL
850005	2006 SF_{200}	—	September 24, 2006	Kitt Peak	Spacewatch	·	1.9 km	MPC · JPL
850006	2006 SV_{200}	—	September 24, 2006	Kitt Peak	Spacewatch	·	550 m	MPC · JPL
850007	2006 SW_{204}	—	September 25, 2006	Mount Lemmon	Mount Lemmon Survey	AST	1.2 km	MPC · JPL
850008	2006 SZ_{204}	—	September 15, 2006	Kitt Peak	Spacewatch	·	1.2 km	MPC · JPL
850009	2006 SZ_{205}	—	September 25, 2006	Anderson Mesa	LONEOS	·	1.2 km	MPC · JPL
850010	2006 SO_{219}	—	September 15, 2006	Kitt Peak	Spacewatch	·	960 m	MPC · JPL
850011	2006 SE_{220}	—	September 25, 2006	Kitt Peak	Spacewatch	·	1.0 km	MPC · JPL
850012	2006 ST_{220}	—	September 25, 2006	Kitt Peak	Spacewatch	H	410 m	MPC · JPL
850013	2006 SH_{225}	—	September 26, 2006	Kitt Peak	Spacewatch	NEM	1.5 km	MPC · JPL
850014	2006 ST_{225}	—	September 18, 2006	Kitt Peak	Spacewatch	·	1.1 km	MPC · JPL
850015	2006 SF_{227}	—	September 26, 2006	Kitt Peak	Spacewatch	·	1.2 km	MPC · JPL
850016	2006 SE_{229}	—	November 9, 1999	Kitt Peak	Spacewatch	·	540 m	MPC · JPL
850017	2006 SR_{230}	—	September 26, 2006	Kitt Peak	Spacewatch	·	530 m	MPC · JPL
850018	2006 SG_{231}	—	September 26, 2006	Kitt Peak	Spacewatch	·	820 m	MPC · JPL
850019	2006 SO_{239}	—	September 18, 2006	Kitt Peak	Spacewatch	·	680 m	MPC · JPL
850020	2006 SA_{241}	—	September 26, 2006	Kitt Peak	Spacewatch	·	1.3 km	MPC · JPL
850021	2006 SO_{243}	—	September 18, 2006	Kitt Peak	Spacewatch	·	890 m	MPC · JPL
850022	2006 SP_{250}	—	September 19, 2006	Kitt Peak	Spacewatch	3:2	3.0 km	MPC · JPL
850023	2006 SJ_{251}	—	September 19, 2006	Kitt Peak	Spacewatch	3:2	3.7 km	MPC · JPL
850024	2006 SA_{253}	—	September 19, 2006	Kitt Peak	Spacewatch	·	1.2 km	MPC · JPL
850025	2006 SZ_{254}	—	September 26, 2006	Mount Lemmon	Mount Lemmon Survey	·	540 m	MPC · JPL
850026	2006 SS_{256}	—	September 26, 2006	Kitt Peak	Spacewatch	·	1.2 km	MPC · JPL
850027	2006 SC_{261}	—	September 19, 2006	Kitt Peak	Spacewatch	NYS	690 m	MPC · JPL
850028	2006 SH_{270}	—	August 13, 2006	Palomar	NEAT	EUP	3.1 km	MPC · JPL
850029	2006 SE_{272}	—	November 20, 2003	Kitt Peak	Spacewatch	·	460 m	MPC · JPL
850030	2006 SL_{273}	—	September 27, 2006	Mount Lemmon	Mount Lemmon Survey	·	1.8 km	MPC · JPL
850031	2006 SC_{275}	—	September 27, 2006	Mount Lemmon	Mount Lemmon Survey	TIR	2.5 km	MPC · JPL
850032	2006 SW_{292}	—	September 25, 2006	Kitt Peak	Spacewatch	·	980 m	MPC · JPL
850033	2006 SY_{293}	—	March 4, 2005	Mount Lemmon	Mount Lemmon Survey	JUN	750 m	MPC · JPL
850034	2006 SL_{295}	—	September 25, 2006	Kitt Peak	Spacewatch	NYS	810 m	MPC · JPL
850035	2006 SE_{297}	—	September 14, 2006	Kitt Peak	Spacewatch	·	1.3 km	MPC · JPL
850036	2006 SZ_{305}	—	September 27, 2006	Kitt Peak	Spacewatch	EOS	1.2 km	MPC · JPL
850037	2006 SC_{306}	—	September 27, 2006	Kitt Peak	Spacewatch	HOF	1.9 km	MPC · JPL
850038	2006 ST_{307}	—	September 27, 2006	Kitt Peak	Spacewatch	·	530 m	MPC · JPL
850039	2006 SM_{308}	—	September 17, 2006	Kitt Peak	Spacewatch	·	420 m	MPC · JPL
850040	2006 SU_{308}	—	September 17, 2006	Kitt Peak	Spacewatch	·	740 m	MPC · JPL
850041	2006 SN_{309}	—	September 27, 2006	Kitt Peak	Spacewatch	·	480 m	MPC · JPL
850042	2006 SL_{314}	—	September 27, 2006	Kitt Peak	Spacewatch	·	980 m	MPC · JPL
850043	2006 SH_{321}	—	September 14, 2006	Kitt Peak	Spacewatch	H	390 m	MPC · JPL
850044	2006 SX_{322}	—	September 27, 2006	Kitt Peak	Spacewatch	NYS	640 m	MPC · JPL
850045	2006 SW_{326}	—	September 23, 2006	Kitt Peak	Spacewatch	·	530 m	MPC · JPL
850046	2006 SX_{328}	—	September 19, 2006	Kitt Peak	Spacewatch	·	1.5 km	MPC · JPL
850047	2006 SL_{349}	—	September 18, 2006	Kitt Peak	Spacewatch	T_{j} (2.95)	2.6 km	MPC · JPL
850048	2006 SC_{362}	—	September 30, 2006	Mount Lemmon	Mount Lemmon Survey	·	2.5 km	MPC · JPL
850049	2006 SY_{362}	—	September 30, 2006	Kitt Peak	Spacewatch	·	1.4 km	MPC · JPL
850050	2006 ST_{381}	—	October 16, 2006	Kitt Peak	Spacewatch	T_{j} (2.97) · 3:2	3.1 km	MPC · JPL
850051	2006 SP_{382}	—	September 19, 2006	Apache Point	SDSS Collaboration	·	2.3 km	MPC · JPL
850052	2006 SM_{387}	—	October 2, 2006	Mount Lemmon	Mount Lemmon Survey	LIX	2.1 km	MPC · JPL
850053	2006 ST_{389}	—	September 16, 2006	Apache Point	SDSS Collaboration	·	1.4 km	MPC · JPL
850054	2006 SX_{396}	—	September 18, 2006	Kitt Peak	Spacewatch	·	760 m	MPC · JPL
850055	2006 SG_{399}	—	September 17, 2006	Kitt Peak	Spacewatch	·	800 m	MPC · JPL
850056	2006 SA_{401}	—	September 26, 2006	Mount Lemmon	Mount Lemmon Survey	·	2.0 km	MPC · JPL
850057	2006 SC_{405}	—	November 30, 2000	Kitt Peak	Spacewatch	·	2.1 km	MPC · JPL
850058	2006 SW_{406}	—	September 23, 2006	Moletai	K. Černis, Zdanavicius, J.	T_{j} (2.97)	3.4 km	MPC · JPL
850059	2006 SU_{407}	—	September 25, 2006	Mount Lemmon	Mount Lemmon Survey	·	870 m	MPC · JPL
850060	2006 SM_{417}	—	December 4, 2015	Haleakala	Pan-STARRS 1	·	800 m	MPC · JPL
850061	2006 SY_{417}	—	February 23, 2015	Haleakala	Pan-STARRS 1	·	1.9 km	MPC · JPL
850062	2006 SL_{421}	—	September 18, 2006	Mauna Kea	P. A. Wiegert	·	1.3 km	MPC · JPL
850063	2006 SE_{423}	—	September 25, 2006	Mount Lemmon	Mount Lemmon Survey	T_{j} (2.97)	2.2 km	MPC · JPL
850064	2006 SO_{423}	—	September 27, 2006	Mount Lemmon	Mount Lemmon Survey	MAS	480 m	MPC · JPL
850065	2006 SU_{427}	—	September 26, 2006	Kitt Peak	Spacewatch	·	1.1 km	MPC · JPL
850066	2006 SK_{428}	—	September 17, 2006	Kitt Peak	Spacewatch	·	1.7 km	MPC · JPL
850067	2006 SN_{429}	—	August 28, 2006	Catalina	CSS	·	490 m	MPC · JPL
850068	2006 SO_{429}	—	September 20, 2006	Palomar	NEAT	·	1 km	MPC · JPL
850069	2006 SR_{429}	—	September 15, 2006	Kitt Peak	Spacewatch	NYS	700 m	MPC · JPL
850070	2006 SP_{430}	—	September 30, 2006	Catalina	CSS	PHO	720 m	MPC · JPL
850071	2006 SW_{431}	—	September 18, 2006	Kitt Peak	Spacewatch	H	380 m	MPC · JPL
850072	2006 SU_{433}	—	December 19, 2015	Mount Lemmon	Mount Lemmon Survey	·	1.1 km	MPC · JPL
850073	2006 SW_{433}	—	September 28, 2006	Mount Lemmon	Mount Lemmon Survey	H	370 m	MPC · JPL
850074	2006 SA_{436}	—	September 26, 2006	Mount Lemmon	Mount Lemmon Survey	·	1.1 km	MPC · JPL
850075	2006 SE_{436}	—	September 27, 2006	Catalina	CSS	·	1.1 km	MPC · JPL
850076	2006 SO_{436}	—	September 25, 2006	Mount Lemmon	Mount Lemmon Survey	·	1.0 km	MPC · JPL
850077	2006 SF_{437}	—	September 25, 2006	Mount Lemmon	Mount Lemmon Survey	·	1.0 km	MPC · JPL
850078	2006 ST_{437}	—	September 25, 2006	Mount Lemmon	Mount Lemmon Survey	·	1.8 km	MPC · JPL
850079	2006 SE_{441}	—	July 3, 2016	Mount Lemmon	Mount Lemmon Survey	·	460 m	MPC · JPL
850080	2006 SA_{442}	—	November 9, 2015	Mount Lemmon	Mount Lemmon Survey	·	1.4 km	MPC · JPL
850081	2006 SU_{442}	—	October 10, 2015	Haleakala	Pan-STARRS 1	HNS	730 m	MPC · JPL
850082	2006 SF_{443}	—	October 10, 2016	Mount Lemmon	Mount Lemmon Survey	·	460 m	MPC · JPL
850083	2006 SH_{444}	—	September 26, 2006	Mount Lemmon	Mount Lemmon Survey	JUN	650 m	MPC · JPL
850084	2006 SM_{445}	—	September 19, 2006	Kitt Peak	Spacewatch	EOS	1.3 km	MPC · JPL
850085	2006 SB_{446}	—	September 25, 2006	Mount Lemmon	Mount Lemmon Survey	·	1.7 km	MPC · JPL
850086	2006 SK_{446}	—	September 19, 2006	Kitt Peak	Spacewatch	·	2.0 km	MPC · JPL
850087	2006 SN_{446}	—	September 17, 2006	Kitt Peak	Spacewatch	·	1.1 km	MPC · JPL
850088	2006 SD_{447}	—	September 17, 2006	Kitt Peak	Spacewatch	·	1.5 km	MPC · JPL
850089	2006 SZ_{447}	—	September 17, 2006	Kitt Peak	Spacewatch	·	590 m	MPC · JPL
850090	2006 SM_{448}	—	September 30, 2006	Mount Lemmon	Mount Lemmon Survey	·	820 m	MPC · JPL
850091	2006 SE_{449}	—	September 27, 2006	Mount Lemmon	Mount Lemmon Survey	·	1.3 km	MPC · JPL
850092	2006 SW_{449}	—	September 17, 2006	Kitt Peak	Spacewatch	·	590 m	MPC · JPL
850093	2006 SW_{453}	—	September 19, 2006	Catalina	CSS	·	850 m	MPC · JPL
850094	2006 SD_{454}	—	September 19, 2006	Kitt Peak	Spacewatch	·	430 m	MPC · JPL
850095	2006 SG_{454}	—	September 28, 2006	Kitt Peak	Spacewatch	·	440 m	MPC · JPL
850096	2006 SU_{455}	—	September 26, 2006	Mount Lemmon	Mount Lemmon Survey	·	1.7 km	MPC · JPL
850097	2006 SU_{456}	—	September 26, 2006	Kitt Peak	Spacewatch	·	870 m	MPC · JPL
850098	2006 SY_{456}	—	September 26, 2006	Mount Lemmon	Mount Lemmon Survey	·	890 m	MPC · JPL
850099	2006 SZ_{456}	—	September 18, 2006	Kitt Peak	Spacewatch	·	650 m	MPC · JPL
850100	2006 SX_{457}	—	September 30, 2006	Mount Lemmon	Mount Lemmon Survey	·	930 m	MPC · JPL

== 850101–850200 ==
back to top

Designation			Discovery			Properties		Ref
Permanent	Provisional	Named after	Date	Site	Discoverer(s)	Category	Diam.	Ref
850101	2006 SY_{457}	—	September 30, 2006	Mount Lemmon	Mount Lemmon Survey	PHO	660 m	MPC · JPL
850102	2006 SE_{458}	—	September 26, 2006	Kitt Peak	Spacewatch	KOR	920 m	MPC · JPL
850103	2006 SH_{458}	—	September 17, 2006	Kitt Peak	Spacewatch	·	830 m	MPC · JPL
850104	2006 SK_{458}	—	September 23, 2006	Kitt Peak	Spacewatch	NYS	850 m	MPC · JPL
850105	2006 SL_{458}	—	September 19, 2006	Catalina	CSS	·	800 m	MPC · JPL
850106	2006 SJ_{459}	—	September 30, 2006	Mount Lemmon	Mount Lemmon Survey	·	1.3 km	MPC · JPL
850107	2006 SH_{460}	—	September 17, 2006	Kitt Peak	Spacewatch	·	970 m	MPC · JPL
850108	2006 SC_{461}	—	September 17, 2006	Kitt Peak	Spacewatch	·	1.3 km	MPC · JPL
850109	2006 SU_{462}	—	September 25, 2006	Mount Lemmon	Mount Lemmon Survey	·	1.2 km	MPC · JPL
850110	2006 SQ_{465}	—	September 27, 2006	Kitt Peak	Spacewatch	·	1.4 km	MPC · JPL
850111	2006 TD_{5}	—	September 14, 2006	Kitt Peak	Spacewatch	·	1.4 km	MPC · JPL
850112	2006 TA_{10}	—	October 2, 2006	Mount Lemmon	Mount Lemmon Survey	·	1.1 km	MPC · JPL
850113	2006 TQ_{15}	—	September 19, 2006	Kitt Peak	Spacewatch	NYS	810 m	MPC · JPL
850114	2006 TD_{16}	—	July 21, 2006	Mount Lemmon	Mount Lemmon Survey	·	1.9 km	MPC · JPL
850115	2006 TH_{20}	—	October 2, 2006	Mount Lemmon	Mount Lemmon Survey	·	1.1 km	MPC · JPL
850116	2006 TF_{30}	—	September 26, 2006	Mount Lemmon	Mount Lemmon Survey	·	1.3 km	MPC · JPL
850117	2006 TJ_{31}	—	September 30, 2006	Mount Lemmon	Mount Lemmon Survey	H	460 m	MPC · JPL
850118	2006 TO_{31}	—	September 27, 2006	Mount Lemmon	Mount Lemmon Survey	JUN	760 m	MPC · JPL
850119	2006 TE_{32}	—	September 26, 2006	Mount Lemmon	Mount Lemmon Survey	T_{j} (2.95) · 3:2	3.3 km	MPC · JPL
850120	2006 TL_{33}	—	September 26, 2006	Mount Lemmon	Mount Lemmon Survey	3:2	3.5 km	MPC · JPL
850121	2006 TX_{42}	—	October 12, 2006	Kitt Peak	Spacewatch	·	740 m	MPC · JPL
850122	2006 TJ_{50}	—	October 12, 2006	Palomar	NEAT	·	1 km	MPC · JPL
850123	2006 TF_{59}	—	October 13, 2006	Kitt Peak	Spacewatch	·	900 m	MPC · JPL
850124	2006 TF_{73}	—	October 4, 2006	Mount Lemmon	Mount Lemmon Survey	·	1.1 km	MPC · JPL
850125	2006 TU_{75}	—	September 18, 2006	Catalina	CSS	·	540 m	MPC · JPL
850126	2006 TF_{77}	—	October 16, 2006	Catalina	CSS	·	900 m	MPC · JPL
850127	2006 TW_{96}	—	September 30, 2006	Mount Lemmon	Mount Lemmon Survey	·	590 m	MPC · JPL
850128	2006 TF_{105}	—	October 15, 2006	Kitt Peak	Spacewatch	·	1.9 km	MPC · JPL
850129	2006 TC_{111}	—	October 1, 2006	Apache Point	SDSS Collaboration	·	1.1 km	MPC · JPL
850130	2006 TE_{112}	—	September 19, 2006	Apache Point	SDSS Collaboration	·	990 m	MPC · JPL
850131	2006 TO_{115}	—	October 1, 2006	Sacramento Peak	SDSS Collaboration	·	1.3 km	MPC · JPL
850132	2006 TQ_{116}	—	October 2, 2006	Sacramento Peak	SDSS Collaboration	·	900 m	MPC · JPL
850133	2006 TY_{122}	—	October 12, 2006	Palomar	NEAT	·	1 km	MPC · JPL
850134	2006 TP_{123}	—	October 2, 2006	Mount Lemmon	Mount Lemmon Survey	·	1.5 km	MPC · JPL
850135	2006 TY_{123}	—	October 2, 2006	Mount Lemmon	Mount Lemmon Survey	NYS	910 m	MPC · JPL
850136	2006 TN_{131}	—	October 2, 2006	Mount Lemmon	Mount Lemmon Survey	ERI	1.0 km	MPC · JPL
850137	2006 TL_{134}	—	October 2, 2006	Mount Lemmon	Mount Lemmon Survey	·	1.5 km	MPC · JPL
850138	2006 TU_{134}	—	October 2, 2006	Mount Lemmon	Mount Lemmon Survey	·	810 m	MPC · JPL
850139	2006 TW_{134}	—	October 2, 2006	Mount Lemmon	Mount Lemmon Survey	·	510 m	MPC · JPL
850140	2006 TC_{136}	—	November 12, 2010	Kitt Peak	Spacewatch	·	1.1 km	MPC · JPL
850141	2006 TQ_{136}	—	October 3, 2006	Mount Lemmon	Mount Lemmon Survey	·	1.1 km	MPC · JPL
850142	2006 TW_{137}	—	October 2, 2006	Kitt Peak	Spacewatch	NYS	640 m	MPC · JPL
850143	2006 TX_{137}	—	January 26, 2017	Haleakala	Pan-STARRS 1	NEM	1.6 km	MPC · JPL
850144	2006 TJ_{138}	—	June 27, 2011	Mount Lemmon	Mount Lemmon Survey	·	2.1 km	MPC · JPL
850145	2006 TR_{138}	—	December 10, 2010	Mount Lemmon	Mount Lemmon Survey	·	400 m	MPC · JPL
850146	2006 TG_{139}	—	October 2, 2006	Mount Lemmon	Mount Lemmon Survey	·	900 m	MPC · JPL
850147	2006 TJ_{139}	—	September 18, 2011	Mount Lemmon	Mount Lemmon Survey	·	1.6 km	MPC · JPL
850148	2006 TR_{139}	—	October 2, 2006	Mount Lemmon	Mount Lemmon Survey	·	410 m	MPC · JPL
850149	2006 TO_{140}	—	October 2, 2006	Mount Lemmon	Mount Lemmon Survey	·	1.7 km	MPC · JPL
850150	2006 TU_{140}	—	October 2, 2006	Mount Lemmon	Mount Lemmon Survey	·	690 m	MPC · JPL
850151	2006 TM_{141}	—	October 1, 2006	Kitt Peak	Spacewatch	MAS	560 m	MPC · JPL
850152	2006 TN_{141}	—	October 11, 2006	Kitt Peak	Spacewatch	·	2.3 km	MPC · JPL
850153	2006 TS_{141}	—	October 2, 2006	Kitt Peak	Spacewatch	H	370 m	MPC · JPL
850154	2006 TD_{142}	—	October 12, 2006	Kitt Peak	Spacewatch	·	480 m	MPC · JPL
850155	2006 TF_{142}	—	October 3, 2006	Mount Lemmon	Mount Lemmon Survey	HOF	2.0 km	MPC · JPL
850156	2006 TQ_{142}	—	October 3, 2006	Mount Lemmon	Mount Lemmon Survey	·	450 m	MPC · JPL
850157	2006 TW_{142}	—	October 2, 2006	Mount Lemmon	Mount Lemmon Survey	·	1.4 km	MPC · JPL
850158	2006 TJ_{143}	—	October 9, 2013	Mount Lemmon	Mount Lemmon Survey	PHO	520 m	MPC · JPL
850159	2006 TR_{143}	—	October 3, 2006	Mount Lemmon	Mount Lemmon Survey	·	1.1 km	MPC · JPL
850160	2006 TU_{143}	—	October 2, 2006	Mount Lemmon	Mount Lemmon Survey	·	1.4 km	MPC · JPL
850161	2006 TW_{143}	—	October 2, 2006	Mount Lemmon	Mount Lemmon Survey	·	680 m	MPC · JPL
850162	2006 TK_{144}	—	October 2, 2006	Mount Lemmon	Mount Lemmon Survey	·	820 m	MPC · JPL
850163	2006 TT_{144}	—	October 4, 2006	Mount Lemmon	Mount Lemmon Survey	·	810 m	MPC · JPL
850164	2006 TL_{145}	—	February 2, 2020	Mount Lemmon	Mount Lemmon Survey	·	880 m	MPC · JPL
850165	2006 UQ_{3}	—	October 17, 2006	Piszkéstető	K. Sárneczky, Kuli, Z.	·	1.1 km	MPC · JPL
850166	2006 UA_{5}	—	September 14, 2006	Kitt Peak	Spacewatch	·	2.2 km	MPC · JPL
850167	2006 UW_{12}	—	October 3, 2006	Mount Lemmon	Mount Lemmon Survey	EUN	760 m	MPC · JPL
850168	2006 UM_{14}	—	October 17, 2006	Mount Lemmon	Mount Lemmon Survey	·	1.1 km	MPC · JPL
850169	2006 UA_{19}	—	September 25, 2006	Kitt Peak	Spacewatch	·	800 m	MPC · JPL
850170	2006 UO_{19}	—	September 25, 2006	Kitt Peak	Spacewatch	·	550 m	MPC · JPL
850171	2006 UC_{22}	—	October 16, 2006	Kitt Peak	Spacewatch	·	430 m	MPC · JPL
850172	2006 UU_{26}	—	September 28, 2006	Mount Lemmon	Mount Lemmon Survey	·	490 m	MPC · JPL
850173	2006 UV_{28}	—	October 16, 2006	Kitt Peak	Spacewatch	·	540 m	MPC · JPL
850174	2006 UY_{32}	—	September 30, 2006	Mount Lemmon	Mount Lemmon Survey	·	1.3 km	MPC · JPL
850175	2006 UM_{35}	—	October 16, 2006	Kitt Peak	Spacewatch	NYS	780 m	MPC · JPL
850176	2006 UN_{41}	—	October 16, 2006	Kitt Peak	Spacewatch	NYS	630 m	MPC · JPL
850177	2006 UE_{42}	—	October 16, 2006	Kitt Peak	Spacewatch	MAS	460 m	MPC · JPL
850178	2006 UK_{43}	—	September 30, 2006	Mount Lemmon	Mount Lemmon Survey	URS	2.3 km	MPC · JPL
850179	2006 UH_{47}	—	October 17, 2006	Catalina	CSS	·	1.1 km	MPC · JPL
850180	2006 UR_{48}	—	October 17, 2006	Kitt Peak	Spacewatch	·	1.1 km	MPC · JPL
850181	2006 UL_{50}	—	September 25, 2006	Kitt Peak	Spacewatch	HOF	1.8 km	MPC · JPL
850182	2006 UZ_{58}	—	October 3, 2006	Mount Lemmon	Mount Lemmon Survey	NYS	790 m	MPC · JPL
850183	2006 UV_{59}	—	September 26, 2006	Kitt Peak	Spacewatch	·	810 m	MPC · JPL
850184	2006 UA_{74}	—	September 26, 2006	Kitt Peak	Spacewatch	·	740 m	MPC · JPL
850185	2006 UJ_{76}	—	October 17, 2006	Mount Lemmon	Mount Lemmon Survey	EOS	1.3 km	MPC · JPL
850186	2006 UB_{78}	—	October 17, 2006	Kitt Peak	Spacewatch	EUN	750 m	MPC · JPL
850187	2006 UL_{79}	—	September 25, 2006	Kitt Peak	Spacewatch	·	750 m	MPC · JPL
850188	2006 UY_{85}	—	September 30, 2006	Mount Lemmon	Mount Lemmon Survey	·	2.7 km	MPC · JPL
850189	2006 US_{94}	—	October 2, 2006	Mount Lemmon	Mount Lemmon Survey	·	730 m	MPC · JPL
850190	2006 UV_{94}	—	October 3, 2006	Mount Lemmon	Mount Lemmon Survey	·	670 m	MPC · JPL
850191	2006 UO_{96}	—	October 18, 2006	Kitt Peak	Spacewatch	·	570 m	MPC · JPL
850192	2006 UA_{99}	—	October 3, 2006	Mount Lemmon	Mount Lemmon Survey	TIN	970 m	MPC · JPL
850193	2006 UD_{105}	—	October 18, 2006	Kitt Peak	Spacewatch	T_{j} (2.98) · 3:2 · (6124)	3.8 km	MPC · JPL
850194	2006 UJ_{106}	—	October 18, 2006	Kitt Peak	Spacewatch	·	750 m	MPC · JPL
850195	2006 UX_{106}	—	October 18, 2006	Kitt Peak	Spacewatch	·	840 m	MPC · JPL
850196	2006 UB_{109}	—	October 18, 2006	Kitt Peak	Spacewatch	·	2.2 km	MPC · JPL
850197	2006 UX_{109}	—	October 19, 2006	Kitt Peak	Spacewatch	·	1.7 km	MPC · JPL
850198	2006 UE_{116}	—	September 19, 2006	Kitt Peak	Spacewatch	·	2.1 km	MPC · JPL
850199	2006 UA_{125}	—	October 19, 2006	Kitt Peak	Spacewatch	·	1.2 km	MPC · JPL
850200	2006 UJ_{133}	—	October 16, 2006	Kitt Peak	Spacewatch	(1547)	790 m	MPC · JPL

== 850201–850300 ==
back to top

Designation			Discovery			Properties		Ref
Permanent	Provisional	Named after	Date	Site	Discoverer(s)	Category	Diam.	Ref
850201	2006 UV_{133}	—	October 19, 2006	Kitt Peak	Spacewatch	MAS	540 m	MPC · JPL
850202	2006 UW_{134}	—	October 19, 2006	Kitt Peak	Spacewatch	EUN	710 m	MPC · JPL
850203	2006 UE_{140}	—	October 19, 2006	Kitt Peak	Spacewatch	·	670 m	MPC · JPL
850204	2006 UG_{150}	—	October 20, 2006	Mount Lemmon	Mount Lemmon Survey	·	450 m	MPC · JPL
850205	2006 UC_{151}	—	October 20, 2006	Mount Lemmon	Mount Lemmon Survey	·	470 m	MPC · JPL
850206	2006 UB_{155}	—	October 2, 2006	Mount Lemmon	Mount Lemmon Survey	·	780 m	MPC · JPL
850207	2006 UY_{158}	—	October 21, 2006	Mount Lemmon	Mount Lemmon Survey	KOR	1.1 km	MPC · JPL
850208	2006 UB_{159}	—	October 2, 2006	Mount Lemmon	Mount Lemmon Survey	·	480 m	MPC · JPL
850209	2006 UP_{160}	—	October 21, 2006	Mount Lemmon	Mount Lemmon Survey	·	750 m	MPC · JPL
850210	2006 UC_{162}	—	September 19, 2006	Kitt Peak	Spacewatch	MAS	530 m	MPC · JPL
850211	2006 US_{162}	—	September 27, 2006	Kitt Peak	Spacewatch	SUL	1.3 km	MPC · JPL
850212	2006 UB_{164}	—	October 21, 2006	Mount Lemmon	Mount Lemmon Survey	·	1.5 km	MPC · JPL
850213	2006 UH_{164}	—	October 2, 2006	Mount Lemmon	Mount Lemmon Survey	·	950 m	MPC · JPL
850214	2006 UR_{165}	—	October 26, 1995	Kitt Peak	Spacewatch	·	670 m	MPC · JPL
850215	2006 UW_{166}	—	October 3, 2006	Mount Lemmon	Mount Lemmon Survey	·	1.5 km	MPC · JPL
850216	2006 UN_{169}	—	October 21, 2006	Mount Lemmon	Mount Lemmon Survey	NYS	790 m	MPC · JPL
850217	2006 UB_{177}	—	October 16, 2006	Catalina	CSS	·	1.5 km	MPC · JPL
850218	2006 UQ_{185}	—	September 17, 2006	Kitt Peak	Spacewatch	·	2.2 km	MPC · JPL
850219	2006 UA_{197}	—	October 20, 2006	Kitt Peak	Spacewatch	(895)	2.5 km	MPC · JPL
850220	2006 UL_{206}	—	September 25, 2006	Mount Lemmon	Mount Lemmon Survey	MAS	520 m	MPC · JPL
850221	2006 UP_{216}	—	October 26, 2006	Lulin	LUSS	·	440 m	MPC · JPL
850222	2006 UP_{235}	—	October 23, 2006	Kitt Peak	Spacewatch	·	510 m	MPC · JPL
850223	2006 UL_{244}	—	October 27, 2006	Mount Lemmon	Mount Lemmon Survey	THM	1.4 km	MPC · JPL
850224	2006 UF_{245}	—	September 30, 2006	Mount Lemmon	Mount Lemmon Survey	·	770 m	MPC · JPL
850225	2006 UK_{249}	—	October 27, 2006	Mount Lemmon	Mount Lemmon Survey	·	1.1 km	MPC · JPL
850226	2006 UR_{254}	—	October 27, 2006	Mount Lemmon	Mount Lemmon Survey	·	2.6 km	MPC · JPL
850227	2006 UC_{255}	—	October 27, 2006	Mount Lemmon	Mount Lemmon Survey	THM	1.4 km	MPC · JPL
850228	2006 UJ_{261}	—	October 20, 2006	Kitt Peak	Spacewatch	H	320 m	MPC · JPL
850229	2006 UA_{262}	—	October 28, 2006	Mount Lemmon	Mount Lemmon Survey	·	700 m	MPC · JPL
850230	2006 UV_{264}	—	October 11, 2006	Kitt Peak	Spacewatch	·	1.1 km	MPC · JPL
850231	2006 UM_{274}	—	September 20, 2006	Vail	Observatory, Jarnac	·	960 m	MPC · JPL
850232	2006 UW_{274}	—	October 28, 2006	Kitt Peak	Spacewatch	·	850 m	MPC · JPL
850233	2006 UP_{275}	—	October 16, 2006	Kitt Peak	Spacewatch	·	890 m	MPC · JPL
850234	2006 UQ_{275}	—	September 18, 2006	Kitt Peak	Spacewatch	·	800 m	MPC · JPL
850235	2006 UV_{278}	—	September 25, 2006	Mount Lemmon	Mount Lemmon Survey	·	1.8 km	MPC · JPL
850236	2006 UD_{279}	—	October 12, 2006	Kitt Peak	Spacewatch	·	2.0 km	MPC · JPL
850237	2006 UY_{279}	—	October 28, 2006	Mount Lemmon	Mount Lemmon Survey	·	1.0 km	MPC · JPL
850238	2006 UA_{288}	—	October 29, 2006	Kitt Peak	Spacewatch	KOR	950 m	MPC · JPL
850239	2006 UQ_{289}	—	September 26, 2006	Mount Lemmon	Mount Lemmon Survey	·	2.4 km	MPC · JPL
850240	2006 UG_{290}	—	October 19, 2006	Kitt Peak	Spacewatch	T_{j} (2.97) · 3:2	4.8 km	MPC · JPL
850241	2006 US_{294}	—	October 19, 2006	Kitt Peak	Deep Ecliptic Survey	·	1.3 km	MPC · JPL
850242	2006 UW_{300}	—	October 19, 2006	Kitt Peak	Deep Ecliptic Survey	·	410 m	MPC · JPL
850243	2006 UD_{306}	—	September 26, 2006	Mount Lemmon	Mount Lemmon Survey	·	400 m	MPC · JPL
850244	2006 US_{308}	—	October 19, 2006	Kitt Peak	Deep Ecliptic Survey	·	710 m	MPC · JPL
850245	2006 UW_{309}	—	October 19, 2006	Kitt Peak	Deep Ecliptic Survey	NYS	700 m	MPC · JPL
850246	2006 UK_{310}	—	September 27, 2006	Kitt Peak	Spacewatch	·	1.1 km	MPC · JPL
850247	2006 UJ_{313}	—	October 19, 2006	Kitt Peak	Deep Ecliptic Survey	·	2.1 km	MPC · JPL
850248	2006 UM_{317}	—	November 11, 2006	Mount Lemmon	Mount Lemmon Survey	·	830 m	MPC · JPL
850249	2006 US_{319}	—	October 19, 2006	Kitt Peak	Deep Ecliptic Survey	(3460)	2.2 km	MPC · JPL
850250	2006 UO_{325}	—	October 2, 2006	Mount Lemmon	Mount Lemmon Survey	·	1.5 km	MPC · JPL
850251	2006 UF_{332}	—	October 21, 2006	Apache Point	SDSS Collaboration	3:2	3.5 km	MPC · JPL
850252	2006 UL_{333}	—	September 26, 2006	Mount Lemmon	Mount Lemmon Survey	(31811)	1.8 km	MPC · JPL
850253	2006 UA_{337}	—	October 23, 2006	Kitt Peak	Spacewatch	·	1.8 km	MPC · JPL
850254	2006 UN_{340}	—	September 30, 2006	Mount Lemmon	Mount Lemmon Survey	T_{j} (2.99) · EUP	2.1 km	MPC · JPL
850255	2006 UN_{345}	—	October 26, 2006	Mauna Kea	P. A. Wiegert	·	1.2 km	MPC · JPL
850256	2006 UD_{346}	—	October 18, 2006	Kitt Peak	Spacewatch	T_{j} (2.96) · 3:2	4.2 km	MPC · JPL
850257	2006 UN_{352}	—	October 26, 2006	Mauna Kea	P. A. Wiegert	AEO	800 m	MPC · JPL
850258	2006 UF_{369}	—	October 24, 2006	Eskridge	D. Tibbets, G. Hug	·	540 m	MPC · JPL
850259	2006 UM_{369}	—	November 14, 2006	Mount Lemmon	Mount Lemmon Survey	·	1.4 km	MPC · JPL
850260	2006 UN_{369}	—	October 18, 2012	Haleakala	Pan-STARRS 1	·	2.3 km	MPC · JPL
850261	2006 UW_{369}	—	October 16, 2006	Kitt Peak	Spacewatch	·	1.2 km	MPC · JPL
850262	2006 UM_{370}	—	November 16, 2006	Mount Lemmon	Mount Lemmon Survey	·	550 m	MPC · JPL
850263	2006 UA_{371}	—	October 21, 2006	Kitt Peak	Spacewatch	THM	1.7 km	MPC · JPL
850264	2006 UU_{371}	—	June 9, 1996	Kitt Peak	Spacewatch	·	500 m	MPC · JPL
850265	2006 UX_{371}	—	October 21, 2006	Kitt Peak	Spacewatch	EOS	1.3 km	MPC · JPL
850266	2006 UG_{372}	—	October 23, 2006	Kitt Peak	Spacewatch	ELF	3.0 km	MPC · JPL
850267	2006 UJ_{373}	—	October 27, 2006	Kitt Peak	Spacewatch	·	1.3 km	MPC · JPL
850268	2006 UP_{374}	—	October 16, 2006	Kitt Peak	Spacewatch	NYS	890 m	MPC · JPL
850269	2006 UT_{376}	—	October 16, 2006	Kitt Peak	Spacewatch	·	1.5 km	MPC · JPL
850270	2006 UL_{378}	—	May 1, 2012	Mount Lemmon	Mount Lemmon Survey	·	460 m	MPC · JPL
850271	2006 UU_{378}	—	November 4, 2013	Mount Lemmon	Mount Lemmon Survey	·	570 m	MPC · JPL
850272	2006 UM_{380}	—	October 22, 2006	Kitt Peak	Spacewatch	MAR	710 m	MPC · JPL
850273	2006 UY_{380}	—	November 28, 2013	Mount Lemmon	Mount Lemmon Survey	·	2.7 km	MPC · JPL
850274	2006 UC_{381}	—	October 16, 2006	Kitt Peak	Spacewatch	·	410 m	MPC · JPL
850275	2006 UK_{381}	—	October 17, 2006	Bergisch Gladbach	W. Bickel	·	520 m	MPC · JPL
850276	2006 UL_{383}	—	October 21, 2006	Kitt Peak	Spacewatch	H	390 m	MPC · JPL
850277	2006 UB_{384}	—	October 21, 2006	Lulin	LUSS	·	470 m	MPC · JPL
850278	2006 UJ_{385}	—	September 28, 2006	Mount Lemmon	Mount Lemmon Survey	·	1.6 km	MPC · JPL
850279	2006 UK_{385}	—	October 20, 2006	Kitt Peak	Spacewatch	·	1.9 km	MPC · JPL
850280	2006 UD_{386}	—	October 21, 2006	Mount Lemmon	Mount Lemmon Survey	·	1.6 km	MPC · JPL
850281	2006 UN_{386}	—	October 22, 2006	Kitt Peak	Spacewatch	KOR	1.1 km	MPC · JPL
850282	2006 UL_{387}	—	October 22, 2006	Mount Lemmon	Mount Lemmon Survey	·	1.4 km	MPC · JPL
850283	2006 UC_{389}	—	May 19, 2018	Haleakala	Pan-STARRS 1	·	440 m	MPC · JPL
850284	2006 UR_{389}	—	October 21, 2006	Kitt Peak	Spacewatch	·	390 m	MPC · JPL
850285	2006 UW_{389}	—	October 20, 2006	Kitt Peak	Spacewatch	·	2.1 km	MPC · JPL
850286	2006 UX_{389}	—	October 21, 2006	Kitt Peak	Spacewatch	·	520 m	MPC · JPL
850287	2006 UY_{389}	—	November 12, 2006	Mount Lemmon	Mount Lemmon Survey	·	1.5 km	MPC · JPL
850288	2006 UO_{390}	—	October 21, 2006	Mount Lemmon	Mount Lemmon Survey	·	800 m	MPC · JPL
850289	2006 UT_{393}	—	October 21, 2006	Mount Lemmon	Mount Lemmon Survey	·	1.4 km	MPC · JPL
850290	2006 UG_{394}	—	October 23, 2006	Mount Lemmon	Mount Lemmon Survey	·	1.1 km	MPC · JPL
850291	2006 UJ_{394}	—	October 23, 2006	Kitt Peak	Spacewatch	·	420 m	MPC · JPL
850292	2006 UR_{394}	—	October 22, 2006	Kitt Peak	Spacewatch	·	800 m	MPC · JPL
850293	2006 UF_{395}	—	October 16, 2006	Kitt Peak	Spacewatch	·	1.9 km	MPC · JPL
850294	2006 UJ_{397}	—	October 20, 2006	Mount Lemmon	Mount Lemmon Survey	·	2.6 km	MPC · JPL
850295	2006 VU_{7}	—	October 19, 2006	Mount Lemmon	Mount Lemmon Survey	·	1.1 km	MPC · JPL
850296	2006 VG_{18}	—	September 30, 2006	Mount Lemmon	Mount Lemmon Survey	·	720 m	MPC · JPL
850297	2006 VU_{21}	—	October 3, 2006	Mount Lemmon	Mount Lemmon Survey	·	510 m	MPC · JPL
850298	2006 VV_{24}	—	November 10, 2006	Kitt Peak	Spacewatch	·	690 m	MPC · JPL
850299	2006 VH_{33}	—	October 27, 2006	Mount Lemmon	Mount Lemmon Survey	·	780 m	MPC · JPL
850300	2006 VR_{38}	—	October 31, 2006	Mount Lemmon	Mount Lemmon Survey	·	930 m	MPC · JPL

== 850301–850400 ==
back to top

Designation			Discovery			Properties		Ref
Permanent	Provisional	Named after	Date	Site	Discoverer(s)	Category	Diam.	Ref
850301	2006 VC_{58}	—	November 11, 2006	Kitt Peak	Spacewatch	·	800 m	MPC · JPL
850302	2006 VE_{58}	—	October 22, 2006	Mount Lemmon	Mount Lemmon Survey	·	530 m	MPC · JPL
850303	2006 VU_{61}	—	November 11, 2006	Kitt Peak	Spacewatch	·	510 m	MPC · JPL
850304	2006 VN_{64}	—	October 23, 2006	Mount Lemmon	Mount Lemmon Survey	·	550 m	MPC · JPL
850305	2006 VK_{70}	—	November 11, 2006	Kitt Peak	Spacewatch	·	530 m	MPC · JPL
850306	2006 VU_{76}	—	November 12, 2006	Mount Lemmon	Mount Lemmon Survey	KOR	970 m	MPC · JPL
850307	2006 VH_{79}	—	November 12, 2006	Mount Lemmon	Mount Lemmon Survey	NYS	590 m	MPC · JPL
850308	2006 VA_{80}	—	October 21, 2006	Mount Lemmon	Mount Lemmon Survey	·	480 m	MPC · JPL
850309	2006 VM_{82}	—	November 2, 2006	Kitt Peak	Spacewatch	·	560 m	MPC · JPL
850310	2006 VO_{82}	—	November 13, 2006	Kitt Peak	Spacewatch	·	510 m	MPC · JPL
850311	2006 VP_{89}	—	October 28, 2006	Mount Lemmon	Mount Lemmon Survey	·	1.0 km	MPC · JPL
850312	2006 VV_{89}	—	November 14, 2006	Kitt Peak	Spacewatch	NYS	850 m	MPC · JPL
850313	2006 VR_{92}	—	November 15, 2006	Catalina	CSS	·	940 m	MPC · JPL
850314	2006 VU_{93}	—	October 2, 2006	Mount Lemmon	Mount Lemmon Survey	·	480 m	MPC · JPL
850315	2006 VO_{94}	—	November 15, 2006	Mount Lemmon	Mount Lemmon Survey	KOR	920 m	MPC · JPL
850316	2006 VN_{102}	—	October 23, 2006	Mount Lemmon	Mount Lemmon Survey	·	2.1 km	MPC · JPL
850317	2006 VC_{109}	—	November 13, 2006	Kitt Peak	Spacewatch	GEF	680 m	MPC · JPL
850318	2006 VM_{109}	—	October 16, 2006	Kitt Peak	Spacewatch	·	490 m	MPC · JPL
850319	2006 VD_{113}	—	November 13, 2006	Kitt Peak	Spacewatch	·	910 m	MPC · JPL
850320	2006 VY_{117}	—	November 14, 2006	Kitt Peak	Spacewatch	KOR	1.2 km	MPC · JPL
850321	2006 VO_{121}	—	November 14, 2006	Mount Lemmon	Mount Lemmon Survey	·	1.2 km	MPC · JPL
850322	2006 VR_{127}	—	November 15, 2006	Kitt Peak	Spacewatch	·	460 m	MPC · JPL
850323	2006 VN_{129}	—	November 15, 2006	Mount Lemmon	Mount Lemmon Survey	PHO	700 m	MPC · JPL
850324	2006 VV_{132}	—	October 31, 2006	Mount Lemmon	Mount Lemmon Survey	·	1.0 km	MPC · JPL
850325	2006 VB_{133}	—	October 22, 2006	Mount Lemmon	Mount Lemmon Survey	·	860 m	MPC · JPL
850326	2006 VS_{141}	—	November 13, 2006	Kitt Peak	Spacewatch	·	760 m	MPC · JPL
850327	2006 VF_{175}	—	October 17, 2006	Mount Lemmon	Mount Lemmon Survey	·	470 m	MPC · JPL
850328	2006 VE_{178}	—	December 25, 2010	Mount Lemmon	Mount Lemmon Survey	PHO	700 m	MPC · JPL
850329	2006 VY_{178}	—	June 19, 2009	Kitt Peak	Spacewatch	·	560 m	MPC · JPL
850330	2006 VS_{179}	—	March 29, 2008	Kitt Peak	Spacewatch	·	940 m	MPC · JPL
850331	2006 VJ_{180}	—	June 8, 2016	Mount Lemmon	Mount Lemmon Survey	·	560 m	MPC · JPL
850332	2006 VE_{183}	—	November 15, 2006	Mount Lemmon	Mount Lemmon Survey	LIX	2.3 km	MPC · JPL
850333	2006 VG_{185}	—	November 1, 2006	Mount Lemmon	Mount Lemmon Survey	·	1.3 km	MPC · JPL
850334	2006 VW_{185}	—	November 2, 2006	Kitt Peak	Spacewatch	·	600 m	MPC · JPL
850335	2006 VF_{186}	—	November 14, 2006	Kitt Peak	Spacewatch	TRE	1.5 km	MPC · JPL
850336	2006 VP_{186}	—	November 12, 2006	Mount Lemmon	Mount Lemmon Survey	MAS	530 m	MPC · JPL
850337	2006 VD_{187}	—	November 11, 2006	Mount Lemmon	Mount Lemmon Survey	·	440 m	MPC · JPL
850338	2006 WJ_{3}	—	November 19, 2006	Socorro	LINEAR	AMO · APO · PHA	360 m	MPC · JPL
850339	2006 WO_{18}	—	November 17, 2006	Mount Lemmon	Mount Lemmon Survey	·	1.4 km	MPC · JPL
850340	2006 WC_{20}	—	October 21, 2006	Mount Lemmon	Mount Lemmon Survey	·	920 m	MPC · JPL
850341	2006 WQ_{41}	—	October 22, 2006	Kitt Peak	Spacewatch	·	440 m	MPC · JPL
850342	2006 WF_{45}	—	October 22, 2006	Kitt Peak	Spacewatch	·	900 m	MPC · JPL
850343	2006 WG_{45}	—	October 16, 2006	Kitt Peak	Spacewatch	·	1.4 km	MPC · JPL
850344	2006 WT_{45}	—	September 30, 2006	Mount Lemmon	Mount Lemmon Survey	·	1.0 km	MPC · JPL
850345	2006 WA_{55}	—	November 16, 2006	Kitt Peak	Spacewatch	PHO	670 m	MPC · JPL
850346	2006 WJ_{58}	—	October 20, 2006	Mount Lemmon	Mount Lemmon Survey	·	930 m	MPC · JPL
850347	2006 WW_{58}	—	November 17, 2006	Kitt Peak	Spacewatch	·	1.1 km	MPC · JPL
850348	2006 WD_{64}	—	May 10, 2005	Kitt Peak	Spacewatch	H	310 m	MPC · JPL
850349	2006 WG_{74}	—	November 18, 2006	Kitt Peak	Spacewatch	NYS	860 m	MPC · JPL
850350	2006 WY_{76}	—	November 1, 2006	Mount Lemmon	Mount Lemmon Survey	·	1.4 km	MPC · JPL
850351	2006 WW_{78}	—	November 18, 2006	Kitt Peak	Spacewatch	EOS	1.5 km	MPC · JPL
850352	2006 WG_{90}	—	November 18, 2006	Kitt Peak	Spacewatch	DOR	1.9 km	MPC · JPL
850353	2006 WW_{90}	—	November 19, 2006	Kitt Peak	Spacewatch	GEF	830 m	MPC · JPL
850354	2006 WN_{94}	—	November 19, 2006	Kitt Peak	Spacewatch	·	1.1 km	MPC · JPL
850355	2006 WS_{95}	—	November 19, 2006	Kitt Peak	Spacewatch	·	1.6 km	MPC · JPL
850356	2006 WE_{97}	—	October 4, 2006	Mount Lemmon	Mount Lemmon Survey	·	1.8 km	MPC · JPL
850357	2006 WP_{98}	—	November 11, 2006	Kitt Peak	Spacewatch	·	1.3 km	MPC · JPL
850358	2006 WU_{106}	—	November 19, 2006	Catalina	CSS	·	830 m	MPC · JPL
850359	2006 WQ_{108}	—	November 19, 2006	Kitt Peak	Spacewatch	·	680 m	MPC · JPL
850360	2006 WP_{119}	—	November 21, 2006	Mount Lemmon	Mount Lemmon Survey	BRA	1.0 km	MPC · JPL
850361	2006 WF_{122}	—	November 21, 2006	Mount Lemmon	Mount Lemmon Survey	PHO	630 m	MPC · JPL
850362	2006 WG_{122}	—	November 21, 2006	Mount Lemmon	Mount Lemmon Survey	·	1.1 km	MPC · JPL
850363	2006 WV_{132}	—	November 18, 2006	Kitt Peak	Spacewatch	·	570 m	MPC · JPL
850364	2006 WC_{134}	—	November 18, 2006	Mount Lemmon	Mount Lemmon Survey	·	900 m	MPC · JPL
850365	2006 WS_{139}	—	November 19, 2006	Kitt Peak	Spacewatch	GEF	790 m	MPC · JPL
850366	2006 WJ_{140}	—	November 19, 2006	Kitt Peak	Spacewatch	·	1.4 km	MPC · JPL
850367	2006 WO_{140}	—	November 20, 2006	Kitt Peak	Spacewatch	·	1.1 km	MPC · JPL
850368	2006 WA_{141}	—	November 20, 2006	Kitt Peak	Spacewatch	KOR	1.0 km	MPC · JPL
850369	2006 WO_{144}	—	November 20, 2006	Kitt Peak	Spacewatch	·	1.8 km	MPC · JPL
850370	2006 WT_{145}	—	November 13, 2006	Kitt Peak	Spacewatch	·	880 m	MPC · JPL
850371	2006 WE_{146}	—	November 20, 2006	Kitt Peak	Spacewatch	·	1.1 km	MPC · JPL
850372	2006 WH_{154}	—	November 22, 2006	Kitt Peak	Spacewatch	KOR	950 m	MPC · JPL
850373	2006 WW_{156}	—	October 23, 2006	Catalina	CSS	·	1.2 km	MPC · JPL
850374	2006 WM_{164}	—	October 22, 2006	Mount Lemmon	Mount Lemmon Survey	·	470 m	MPC · JPL
850375	2006 WM_{167}	—	November 23, 2006	Kitt Peak	Spacewatch	·	1.5 km	MPC · JPL
850376	2006 WW_{167}	—	October 22, 2006	Mount Lemmon	Mount Lemmon Survey	·	1.4 km	MPC · JPL
850377	2006 WW_{169}	—	November 11, 2006	Kitt Peak	Spacewatch	·	880 m	MPC · JPL
850378	2006 WB_{170}	—	November 23, 2006	Kitt Peak	Spacewatch	MRX	800 m	MPC · JPL
850379	2006 WZ_{171}	—	October 31, 2006	Mount Lemmon	Mount Lemmon Survey	·	450 m	MPC · JPL
850380	2006 WJ_{176}	—	November 23, 2006	Mount Lemmon	Mount Lemmon Survey	·	820 m	MPC · JPL
850381	2006 WL_{180}	—	November 24, 2006	Mount Lemmon	Mount Lemmon Survey	·	1.2 km	MPC · JPL
850382	2006 WF_{182}	—	November 24, 2006	Mount Lemmon	Mount Lemmon Survey	·	1.8 km	MPC · JPL
850383	2006 WU_{200}	—	November 23, 2006	Kitt Peak	Spacewatch	·	610 m	MPC · JPL
850384	2006 WD_{205}	—	November 19, 2006	Kitt Peak	Spacewatch	·	1.8 km	MPC · JPL
850385	2006 WZ_{214}	—	August 18, 2009	Kitt Peak	Spacewatch	·	580 m	MPC · JPL
850386	2006 WC_{216}	—	November 19, 2006	Catalina	CSS	·	620 m	MPC · JPL
850387	2006 WM_{216}	—	November 16, 2006	Kitt Peak	Spacewatch	·	900 m	MPC · JPL
850388	2006 WV_{216}	—	July 8, 2013	Haleakala	Pan-STARRS 1	·	720 m	MPC · JPL
850389	2006 WE_{218}	—	July 30, 2009	Catalina	CSS	·	540 m	MPC · JPL
850390	2006 WK_{218}	—	July 5, 2010	Kitt Peak	Spacewatch	·	1.2 km	MPC · JPL
850391	2006 WN_{223}	—	February 27, 2015	Haleakala	Pan-STARRS 1	·	490 m	MPC · JPL
850392	2006 WG_{226}	—	September 18, 2010	Mount Lemmon	Mount Lemmon Survey	(12739)	1.1 km	MPC · JPL
850393	2006 WM_{226}	—	November 16, 2006	Mount Lemmon	Mount Lemmon Survey	·	2.1 km	MPC · JPL
850394	2006 WO_{231}	—	November 16, 2006	Mount Lemmon	Mount Lemmon Survey	·	610 m	MPC · JPL
850395	2006 WD_{233}	—	November 19, 2006	Kitt Peak	Spacewatch	·	490 m	MPC · JPL
850396	2006 WZ_{233}	—	November 20, 2006	Kitt Peak	Spacewatch	KOR	980 m	MPC · JPL
850397	2006 WR_{234}	—	November 21, 2006	Mount Lemmon	Mount Lemmon Survey	·	1.6 km	MPC · JPL
850398	2006 WB_{235}	—	November 18, 2006	Mount Lemmon	Mount Lemmon Survey	·	770 m	MPC · JPL
850399	2006 WS_{235}	—	November 24, 2006	Kitt Peak	Spacewatch	·	1.5 km	MPC · JPL
850400	2006 WB_{237}	—	November 23, 2006	Mount Lemmon	Mount Lemmon Survey	·	1.1 km	MPC · JPL

== 850401–850500 ==
back to top

Designation			Discovery			Properties		Ref
Permanent	Provisional	Named after	Date	Site	Discoverer(s)	Category	Diam.	Ref
850401	2006 XW_{3}	—	December 1, 2006	Mount Lemmon	Mount Lemmon Survey	H	470 m	MPC · JPL
850402	2006 XN_{14}	—	December 10, 2006	Kitt Peak	Spacewatch	·	590 m	MPC · JPL
850403	2006 XX_{31}	—	December 13, 2006	Mount Lemmon	Mount Lemmon Survey	·	840 m	MPC · JPL
850404	2006 XX_{35}	—	December 11, 2006	Kitt Peak	Spacewatch	·	670 m	MPC · JPL
850405	2006 XK_{44}	—	December 13, 2006	Kitt Peak	Spacewatch	·	540 m	MPC · JPL
850406	2006 XQ_{70}	—	December 12, 2006	Mount Lemmon	Mount Lemmon Survey	·	1.7 km	MPC · JPL
850407	2006 XB_{72}	—	December 13, 2006	Mount Lemmon	Mount Lemmon Survey	·	1.1 km	MPC · JPL
850408	2006 XL_{74}	—	December 1, 2006	Mount Lemmon	Mount Lemmon Survey	·	1.9 km	MPC · JPL
850409	2006 XW_{75}	—	December 13, 2006	Kitt Peak	Spacewatch	·	1.8 km	MPC · JPL
850410	2006 XG_{76}	—	December 7, 2013	Haleakala	Pan-STARRS 1	·	540 m	MPC · JPL
850411	2006 XM_{76}	—	December 11, 2006	Kitt Peak	Spacewatch	H	440 m	MPC · JPL
850412	2006 XS_{76}	—	December 9, 2006	Kitt Peak	Spacewatch	·	870 m	MPC · JPL
850413	2006 XE_{78}	—	September 23, 2011	Haleakala	Pan-STARRS 1	THM	1.3 km	MPC · JPL
850414	2006 XC_{79}	—	December 15, 2006	Kitt Peak	Spacewatch	·	1.0 km	MPC · JPL
850415	2006 XZ_{79}	—	December 15, 2006	Kitt Peak	Spacewatch	MAS	540 m	MPC · JPL
850416	2006 XH_{80}	—	December 13, 2006	Kitt Peak	Spacewatch	·	1.7 km	MPC · JPL
850417	2006 XQ_{81}	—	December 13, 2006	Mount Lemmon	Mount Lemmon Survey	KOR	990 m	MPC · JPL
850418	2006 XK_{82}	—	December 1, 2006	Mount Lemmon	Mount Lemmon Survey	MAS	470 m	MPC · JPL
850419	2006 YG_{11}	—	November 17, 2006	Mount Lemmon	Mount Lemmon Survey	·	1.6 km	MPC · JPL
850420	2006 YU_{24}	—	December 21, 2006	Kitt Peak	Spacewatch	(5)	740 m	MPC · JPL
850421	2006 YJ_{27}	—	December 21, 2006	Kitt Peak	Spacewatch	·	450 m	MPC · JPL
850422	2006 YA_{28}	—	December 1, 2006	Mount Lemmon	Mount Lemmon Survey	·	1.7 km	MPC · JPL
850423	2006 YX_{49}	—	December 27, 2006	Mount Lemmon	Mount Lemmon Survey	KOR	1.1 km	MPC · JPL
850424	2006 YZ_{56}	—	November 27, 2006	Catalina	CSS	PHO	870 m	MPC · JPL
850425	2006 YS_{58}	—	December 24, 2006	Kitt Peak	Spacewatch	·	780 m	MPC · JPL
850426	2006 YW_{59}	—	December 16, 2006	Kitt Peak	Spacewatch	H	540 m	MPC · JPL
850427	2006 YN_{61}	—	April 11, 2008	Mount Lemmon	Mount Lemmon Survey	·	1.3 km	MPC · JPL
850428	2006 YK_{64}	—	December 27, 2006	Mount Lemmon	Mount Lemmon Survey	·	600 m	MPC · JPL
850429	2006 YZ_{67}	—	December 16, 2006	Kitt Peak	Spacewatch	·	590 m	MPC · JPL
850430	2006 YK_{68}	—	December 24, 2006	Kitt Peak	Spacewatch	EOS	1.5 km	MPC · JPL
850431	2006 YN_{68}	—	December 21, 2006	Kitt Peak	Spacewatch	NYS	660 m	MPC · JPL
850432	2006 YR_{68}	—	December 16, 2006	Mount Lemmon	Mount Lemmon Survey	·	630 m	MPC · JPL
850433	2006 YT_{68}	—	December 21, 2006	Kitt Peak	L. H. Wasserman, M. W. Buie	MAS	490 m	MPC · JPL
850434	2006 YS_{69}	—	December 27, 2006	Mount Lemmon	Mount Lemmon Survey	·	1.4 km	MPC · JPL
850435	2006 YP_{70}	—	December 27, 2006	Mount Lemmon	Mount Lemmon Survey	·	940 m	MPC · JPL
850436	2007 AM_{20}	—	December 21, 2006	Kitt Peak	Spacewatch	·	960 m	MPC · JPL
850437	2007 AN_{34}	—	January 10, 2007	Kitt Peak	Spacewatch	·	730 m	MPC · JPL
850438	2007 AP_{34}	—	January 15, 2007	Mauna Kea	P. A. Wiegert	AGN	770 m	MPC · JPL
850439	2007 AL_{36}	—	January 15, 2007	Mauna Kea	P. A. Wiegert	·	1.2 km	MPC · JPL
850440	2007 AD_{37}	—	January 10, 2007	Kitt Peak	Spacewatch	·	1.0 km	MPC · JPL
850441	2007 AM_{38}	—	January 10, 2007	Mount Lemmon	Mount Lemmon Survey	EOS	1.4 km	MPC · JPL
850442	2007 AJ_{39}	—	January 9, 2007	Mount Lemmon	Mount Lemmon Survey	THM	1.5 km	MPC · JPL
850443	2007 AK_{39}	—	January 10, 2007	Kitt Peak	Spacewatch	·	1.8 km	MPC · JPL
850444	2007 AO_{39}	—	January 10, 2007	Kitt Peak	Spacewatch	·	870 m	MPC · JPL
850445	2007 AK_{40}	—	January 15, 2007	Mauna Kea	P. A. Wiegert	·	1.4 km	MPC · JPL
850446	2007 BE_{28}	—	January 17, 2007	Kitt Peak	Spacewatch	PHO	830 m	MPC · JPL
850447	2007 BW_{30}	—	January 20, 2007	Mauna Kea	D. D. Balam, K. M. Perrett	·	1.4 km	MPC · JPL
850448	2007 BU_{32}	—	January 24, 2007	Mount Lemmon	Mount Lemmon Survey	MAS	460 m	MPC · JPL
850449	2007 BV_{40}	—	January 24, 2007	Mount Lemmon	Mount Lemmon Survey	·	1.5 km	MPC · JPL
850450	2007 BB_{49}	—	January 27, 2007	Mount Lemmon	Mount Lemmon Survey	AMO	410 m	MPC · JPL
850451	2007 BY_{58}	—	January 25, 2007	Kitt Peak	Spacewatch	·	1.0 km	MPC · JPL
850452	2007 BF_{59}	—	January 17, 2007	Kitt Peak	Spacewatch	MAS	480 m	MPC · JPL
850453	2007 BJ_{59}	—	January 25, 2007	Kitt Peak	Spacewatch	·	530 m	MPC · JPL
850454	2007 BX_{60}	—	December 24, 2006	Kitt Peak	Spacewatch	·	510 m	MPC · JPL
850455	2007 BC_{62}	—	January 27, 2007	Kitt Peak	Spacewatch	·	750 m	MPC · JPL
850456	2007 BA_{68}	—	January 27, 2007	Mount Lemmon	Mount Lemmon Survey	·	2.1 km	MPC · JPL
850457	2007 BR_{72}	—	January 24, 2007	Mount Nyukasa	Japan Aerospace Exploration Agency	·	920 m	MPC · JPL
850458	2007 BA_{81}	—	January 27, 2007	Mount Lemmon	Mount Lemmon Survey	·	420 m	MPC · JPL
850459	2007 BU_{83}	—	January 19, 2007	Mauna Kea	P. A. Wiegert	THM	1.5 km	MPC · JPL
850460	2007 BK_{87}	—	January 19, 2007	Mauna Kea	P. A. Wiegert	·	1.4 km	MPC · JPL
850461	2007 BC_{88}	—	January 19, 2007	Mauna Kea	P. A. Wiegert	MAS	490 m	MPC · JPL
850462	2007 BU_{88}	—	January 17, 2007	Kitt Peak	Spacewatch	·	660 m	MPC · JPL
850463	2007 BG_{89}	—	January 25, 2007	Kitt Peak	Spacewatch	·	460 m	MPC · JPL
850464	2007 BR_{90}	—	January 27, 2007	Kitt Peak	Spacewatch	·	480 m	MPC · JPL
850465	2007 BG_{107}	—	January 28, 2007	Mount Lemmon	Mount Lemmon Survey	·	1.3 km	MPC · JPL
850466	2007 BP_{107}	—	August 26, 2012	Haleakala	Pan-STARRS 1	·	520 m	MPC · JPL
850467	2007 BG_{108}	—	January 27, 2007	Kitt Peak	Spacewatch	·	560 m	MPC · JPL
850468	2007 BP_{108}	—	December 21, 2006	Kitt Peak	L. H. Wasserman, M. W. Buie	·	830 m	MPC · JPL
850469	2007 BR_{108}	—	January 26, 2007	Kitt Peak	Spacewatch	PHO	700 m	MPC · JPL
850470	2007 BW_{108}	—	January 17, 2007	Kitt Peak	Spacewatch	·	1.2 km	MPC · JPL
850471	2007 BV_{109}	—	April 2, 2011	Kitt Peak	Spacewatch	·	700 m	MPC · JPL
850472	2007 BZ_{110}	—	January 27, 2007	Mount Lemmon	Mount Lemmon Survey	NYS	620 m	MPC · JPL
850473	2007 BJ_{111}	—	March 30, 2011	Mount Lemmon	Mount Lemmon Survey	·	660 m	MPC · JPL
850474	2007 BK_{111}	—	January 27, 2007	Kitt Peak	Spacewatch	TIN	1.0 km	MPC · JPL
850475	2007 BN_{112}	—	February 6, 2014	Kitt Peak	Spacewatch	·	560 m	MPC · JPL
850476	2007 BO_{114}	—	January 17, 2007	Kitt Peak	Spacewatch	·	760 m	MPC · JPL
850477	2007 BO_{115}	—	January 27, 2007	Kitt Peak	Spacewatch	·	530 m	MPC · JPL
850478	2007 BT_{115}	—	January 27, 2007	Mount Lemmon	Mount Lemmon Survey	NYS	510 m	MPC · JPL
850479	2007 BP_{116}	—	January 17, 2007	Kitt Peak	Spacewatch	·	1.5 km	MPC · JPL
850480	2007 BZ_{116}	—	January 24, 2007	Mount Lemmon	Mount Lemmon Survey	·	1.6 km	MPC · JPL
850481	2007 BB_{117}	—	January 24, 2007	Mount Lemmon	Mount Lemmon Survey	·	1.4 km	MPC · JPL
850482	2007 BH_{117}	—	January 28, 2007	Mount Lemmon	Mount Lemmon Survey	·	1.5 km	MPC · JPL
850483	2007 BC_{118}	—	January 27, 2007	Mount Lemmon	Mount Lemmon Survey	EOS	1.4 km	MPC · JPL
850484	2007 BQ_{118}	—	April 6, 2008	Mount Lemmon	Mount Lemmon Survey	(5)	920 m	MPC · JPL
850485	2007 BB_{119}	—	January 27, 2007	Mount Lemmon	Mount Lemmon Survey	·	840 m	MPC · JPL
850486	2007 BB_{120}	—	January 26, 2007	Kitt Peak	Spacewatch	EOS	1.4 km	MPC · JPL
850487	2007 BC_{120}	—	January 27, 2007	Kitt Peak	Spacewatch	·	860 m	MPC · JPL
850488	2007 BT_{120}	—	January 24, 2007	Mount Lemmon	Mount Lemmon Survey	THM	1.6 km	MPC · JPL
850489	2007 BV_{120}	—	November 18, 2009	Kitt Peak	Spacewatch	·	440 m	MPC · JPL
850490	2007 CE_{3}	—	January 9, 2007	Kitt Peak	Spacewatch	PHO	650 m	MPC · JPL
850491	2007 CY_{5}	—	January 17, 2007	Palomar	NEAT	H	560 m	MPC · JPL
850492	2007 CM_{12}	—	February 6, 2007	Mount Lemmon	Mount Lemmon Survey	·	780 m	MPC · JPL
850493	2007 CA_{15}	—	February 7, 2007	Mount Lemmon	Mount Lemmon Survey	·	1.9 km	MPC · JPL
850494	2007 CM_{24}	—	February 8, 2007	Kitt Peak	Spacewatch	·	440 m	MPC · JPL
850495	2007 CJ_{33}	—	February 6, 2007	Mount Lemmon	Mount Lemmon Survey	MAS	460 m	MPC · JPL
850496	2007 CH_{41}	—	February 7, 2007	Kitt Peak	Spacewatch	·	1.9 km	MPC · JPL
850497	2007 CD_{42}	—	January 27, 2007	Kitt Peak	Spacewatch	·	560 m	MPC · JPL
850498	2007 CO_{43}	—	February 8, 2007	Kitt Peak	Spacewatch	PHO	600 m	MPC · JPL
850499	2007 CN_{48}	—	February 10, 2007	Mount Lemmon	Mount Lemmon Survey	·	2.0 km	MPC · JPL
850500	2007 CP_{72}	—	February 14, 2007	Mauna Kea	P. A. Wiegert	·	640 m	MPC · JPL

== 850501–850600 ==
back to top

Designation			Discovery			Properties		Ref
Permanent	Provisional	Named after	Date	Site	Discoverer(s)	Category	Diam.	Ref
850501	2007 CB_{73}	—	February 14, 2007	Mauna Kea	P. A. Wiegert	·	900 m	MPC · JPL
850502	2007 CL_{76}	—	October 7, 2005	Mount Lemmon	Mount Lemmon Survey	·	800 m	MPC · JPL
850503	2007 CT_{84}	—	February 13, 2007	Mount Lemmon	Mount Lemmon Survey	·	770 m	MPC · JPL
850504	2007 CC_{85}	—	February 13, 2007	Mount Lemmon	Mount Lemmon Survey	·	700 m	MPC · JPL
850505	2007 CF_{85}	—	September 11, 2015	Haleakala	Pan-STARRS 1	·	410 m	MPC · JPL
850506	2007 CK_{85}	—	February 8, 2007	Kitt Peak	Spacewatch	·	1.5 km	MPC · JPL
850507	2007 CY_{85}	—	April 21, 2020	Haleakala	Pan-STARRS 2	·	720 m	MPC · JPL
850508	2007 CF_{87}	—	February 13, 2007	Mount Lemmon	Mount Lemmon Survey	·	450 m	MPC · JPL
850509	2007 DS_{8}	—	February 17, 2007	Kitt Peak	Spacewatch	·	490 m	MPC · JPL
850510	2007 DW_{8}	—	February 8, 2007	Kitt Peak	Spacewatch	·	1.4 km	MPC · JPL
850511	2007 DG_{17}	—	February 17, 2007	Kitt Peak	Spacewatch	NYS	910 m	MPC · JPL
850512	2007 DC_{25}	—	January 27, 2007	Mount Lemmon	Mount Lemmon Survey	EOS	1.4 km	MPC · JPL
850513	2007 DW_{33}	—	February 17, 2007	Kitt Peak	Spacewatch	NYS	830 m	MPC · JPL
850514	2007 DB_{36}	—	February 17, 2007	Kitt Peak	Spacewatch	·	2.2 km	MPC · JPL
850515	2007 DP_{37}	—	February 17, 2007	Kitt Peak	Spacewatch	·	550 m	MPC · JPL
850516	2007 DS_{52}	—	February 19, 2007	Mount Lemmon	Mount Lemmon Survey	·	810 m	MPC · JPL
850517	2007 DT_{55}	—	February 21, 2007	Kitt Peak	Spacewatch	ERI	960 m	MPC · JPL
850518	2007 DD_{66}	—	February 21, 2007	Kitt Peak	Spacewatch	·	900 m	MPC · JPL
850519	2007 DT_{87}	—	February 23, 2007	Kitt Peak	Spacewatch	·	510 m	MPC · JPL
850520	2007 DF_{95}	—	February 23, 2007	Kitt Peak	Spacewatch	EUP	2.5 km	MPC · JPL
850521	2007 DG_{101}	—	February 26, 2007	Mount Lemmon	Mount Lemmon Survey	·	510 m	MPC · JPL
850522	2007 DK_{117}	—	February 25, 2007	Kitt Peak	Spacewatch	·	2.2 km	MPC · JPL
850523	2007 DC_{124}	—	September 6, 2008	Mount Lemmon	Mount Lemmon Survey	·	780 m	MPC · JPL
850524	2007 DE_{124}	—	February 25, 2007	Mount Lemmon	Mount Lemmon Survey	MAS	530 m	MPC · JPL
850525	2007 DH_{125}	—	November 8, 2009	Kitt Peak	Spacewatch	·	580 m	MPC · JPL
850526	2007 DA_{126}	—	February 17, 2007	Kitt Peak	Spacewatch	·	830 m	MPC · JPL
850527	2007 DH_{126}	—	March 22, 2015	Haleakala	Pan-STARRS 1	·	910 m	MPC · JPL
850528	2007 DU_{126}	—	September 9, 2015	Haleakala	Pan-STARRS 1	·	400 m	MPC · JPL
850529	2007 DD_{129}	—	February 21, 2007	Mount Lemmon	Mount Lemmon Survey	·	420 m	MPC · JPL
850530	2007 DS_{129}	—	February 25, 2007	Mount Lemmon	Mount Lemmon Survey	·	830 m	MPC · JPL
850531	2007 DE_{130}	—	February 25, 2007	Mount Lemmon	Mount Lemmon Survey	·	650 m	MPC · JPL
850532	2007 DA_{132}	—	February 25, 2007	Mount Lemmon	Mount Lemmon Survey	·	1.2 km	MPC · JPL
850533	2007 DD_{134}	—	February 21, 2007	Mount Lemmon	Mount Lemmon Survey	·	1.8 km	MPC · JPL
850534	2007 DT_{134}	—	February 25, 2007	Mount Lemmon	Mount Lemmon Survey	·	870 m	MPC · JPL
850535	2007 DC_{135}	—	February 23, 2007	Kitt Peak	Spacewatch	·	680 m	MPC · JPL
850536	2007 EZ	—	March 10, 2007	Socorro	LINEAR	APO	360 m	MPC · JPL
850537	2007 EK_{10}	—	March 9, 2007	Kitt Peak	Spacewatch	·	1.8 km	MPC · JPL
850538	2007 EY_{11}	—	February 25, 2007	Anderson Mesa	LONEOS	·	1.2 km	MPC · JPL
850539	2007 ED_{35}	—	March 11, 2007	Mount Lemmon	Mount Lemmon Survey	EUP	3.1 km	MPC · JPL
850540	2007 EA_{36}	—	February 25, 2007	Kitt Peak	Spacewatch	·	1.0 km	MPC · JPL
850541	2007 EF_{38}	—	March 11, 2007	Mount Lemmon	Mount Lemmon Survey	NYS	710 m	MPC · JPL
850542	2007 EA_{50}	—	March 10, 2007	Mount Lemmon	Mount Lemmon Survey	·	1.8 km	MPC · JPL
850543	2007 EG_{55}	—	March 12, 2007	Mount Lemmon	Mount Lemmon Survey	·	730 m	MPC · JPL
850544	2007 EM_{63}	—	March 10, 2007	Kitt Peak	Spacewatch	·	1.7 km	MPC · JPL
850545	2007 ET_{73}	—	February 25, 2007	Kitt Peak	Spacewatch	·	610 m	MPC · JPL
850546	2007 ET_{77}	—	February 26, 2007	Mount Lemmon	Mount Lemmon Survey	·	540 m	MPC · JPL
850547	2007 EF_{81}	—	February 22, 2007	Socorro	LINEAR	T_{j} (2.88)	2.8 km	MPC · JPL
850548	2007 EL_{87}	—	March 13, 2007	Kitt Peak	Spacewatch	·	1.4 km	MPC · JPL
850549	2007 EW_{89}	—	January 28, 2007	Mount Lemmon	Mount Lemmon Survey	·	760 m	MPC · JPL
850550	2007 ED_{90}	—	February 21, 2007	Mount Lemmon	Mount Lemmon Survey	MAS	580 m	MPC · JPL
850551	2007 EX_{93}	—	March 10, 2007	Mount Lemmon	Mount Lemmon Survey	·	690 m	MPC · JPL
850552	2007 EP_{104}	—	February 26, 2007	Mount Lemmon	Mount Lemmon Survey	NYS	770 m	MPC · JPL
850553	2007 EM_{109}	—	March 11, 2007	Kitt Peak	Spacewatch	·	750 m	MPC · JPL
850554	2007 EE_{112}	—	March 11, 2007	Kitt Peak	Spacewatch	·	750 m	MPC · JPL
850555	2007 EA_{113}	—	March 12, 2007	Bergisch Gladbach	W. Bickel	·	540 m	MPC · JPL
850556	2007 EQ_{114}	—	March 13, 2007	Kitt Peak	Spacewatch	THB	1.6 km	MPC · JPL
850557	2007 EZ_{127}	—	March 9, 2007	Kitt Peak	Spacewatch	MAS	580 m	MPC · JPL
850558	2007 EB_{135}	—	March 10, 2007	Mount Lemmon	Mount Lemmon Survey	·	1.6 km	MPC · JPL
850559	2007 EB_{153}	—	March 12, 2007	Mount Lemmon	Mount Lemmon Survey	NYS	680 m	MPC · JPL
850560	2007 EQ_{158}	—	February 8, 2007	Catalina	CSS	·	680 m	MPC · JPL
850561	2007 EN_{161}	—	March 15, 2007	Kitt Peak	Spacewatch	·	1.9 km	MPC · JPL
850562	2007 EO_{176}	—	March 14, 2007	Kitt Peak	Spacewatch	·	530 m	MPC · JPL
850563	2007 EM_{183}	—	March 12, 2007	Mount Lemmon	Mount Lemmon Survey	·	1.7 km	MPC · JPL
850564	2007 EZ_{190}	—	March 13, 2007	Kitt Peak	Spacewatch	EUN	840 m	MPC · JPL
850565	2007 EJ_{196}	—	March 15, 2007	Kitt Peak	Spacewatch	·	540 m	MPC · JPL
850566	2007 EQ_{207}	—	March 14, 2007	Mount Lemmon	Mount Lemmon Survey	EOS	1.3 km	MPC · JPL
850567	2007 EW_{226}	—	March 11, 2007	Mount Lemmon	Mount Lemmon Survey	·	760 m	MPC · JPL
850568	2007 ES_{228}	—	March 12, 2007	Kitt Peak	Spacewatch	·	490 m	MPC · JPL
850569	2007 EL_{229}	—	March 11, 2007	Kitt Peak	Spacewatch	·	890 m	MPC · JPL
850570	2007 ET_{230}	—	March 15, 2007	Mount Lemmon	Mount Lemmon Survey	·	590 m	MPC · JPL
850571	2007 EU_{230}	—	March 15, 2007	Mount Lemmon	Mount Lemmon Survey	·	1.5 km	MPC · JPL
850572	2007 ET_{232}	—	March 9, 2007	Mount Lemmon	Mount Lemmon Survey	·	770 m	MPC · JPL
850573	2007 EP_{233}	—	March 12, 2007	Mount Lemmon	Mount Lemmon Survey	PHO	670 m	MPC · JPL
850574	2007 ED_{235}	—	November 10, 2009	Kitt Peak	Spacewatch	·	650 m	MPC · JPL
850575	2007 EJ_{235}	—	April 10, 2014	Haleakala	Pan-STARRS 1	·	590 m	MPC · JPL
850576	2007 EO_{235}	—	April 10, 2013	Haleakala	Pan-STARRS 1	THM	1.6 km	MPC · JPL
850577	2007 EC_{237}	—	March 15, 2007	Kitt Peak	Spacewatch	·	850 m	MPC · JPL
850578	2007 EH_{240}	—	March 14, 2007	Kitt Peak	Spacewatch	ADE	1.3 km	MPC · JPL
850579	2007 EM_{241}	—	March 10, 2007	Mount Lemmon	Mount Lemmon Survey	·	510 m	MPC · JPL
850580	2007 EP_{241}	—	March 15, 2007	Kitt Peak	Spacewatch	MAS	570 m	MPC · JPL
850581	2007 EW_{241}	—	March 12, 2007	Mount Lemmon	Mount Lemmon Survey	·	430 m	MPC · JPL
850582	2007 EZ_{241}	—	March 10, 2007	Mount Lemmon	Mount Lemmon Survey	·	500 m	MPC · JPL
850583	2007 EU_{242}	—	March 14, 2007	Mount Lemmon	Mount Lemmon Survey	ADE	1.3 km	MPC · JPL
850584	2007 EC_{243}	—	March 10, 2007	Mount Lemmon	Mount Lemmon Survey	·	1.2 km	MPC · JPL
850585	2007 EW_{243}	—	March 9, 2007	Kitt Peak	Spacewatch	MAS	450 m	MPC · JPL
850586	2007 FN_{7}	—	March 9, 2007	Kitt Peak	Spacewatch	NYS	750 m	MPC · JPL
850587	2007 FQ_{8}	—	March 16, 2007	Kitt Peak	Spacewatch	·	610 m	MPC · JPL
850588	2007 FF_{9}	—	March 16, 2007	Kitt Peak	Spacewatch	TIR	2.0 km	MPC · JPL
850589	2007 FS_{11}	—	March 17, 2007	Kitt Peak	Spacewatch	NYS	840 m	MPC · JPL
850590	2007 FF_{17}	—	March 20, 2007	Mount Lemmon	Mount Lemmon Survey	·	610 m	MPC · JPL
850591	2007 FG_{17}	—	March 20, 2007	Mount Lemmon	Mount Lemmon Survey	·	1.9 km	MPC · JPL
850592	2007 FF_{19}	—	March 20, 2007	Mount Lemmon	Mount Lemmon Survey	·	930 m	MPC · JPL
850593	2007 FD_{20}	—	March 24, 2007	Wrightwood	J. W. Young	TIR	2.1 km	MPC · JPL
850594	2007 FX_{33}	—	March 16, 2007	Mount Lemmon	Mount Lemmon Survey	MAS	460 m	MPC · JPL
850595	2007 FW_{34}	—	March 20, 2007	Mauna Kea	D. D. Balam, K. M. Perrett	T_{j} (2.98) · 3:2	2.9 km	MPC · JPL
850596	2007 FM_{39}	—	March 16, 2007	Mount Lemmon	Mount Lemmon Survey	V	400 m	MPC · JPL
850597	2007 FQ_{41}	—	March 13, 2007	Kitt Peak	Spacewatch	·	770 m	MPC · JPL
850598	2007 FR_{41}	—	March 10, 2007	Mount Lemmon	Mount Lemmon Survey	·	2.5 km	MPC · JPL
850599	2007 FP_{50}	—	March 26, 2007	Mount Lemmon	Mount Lemmon Survey	·	1.1 km	MPC · JPL
850600	2007 FC_{52}	—	March 26, 2007	Kitt Peak	Spacewatch	·	1.9 km	MPC · JPL

== 850601–850700 ==
back to top

Designation			Discovery			Properties		Ref
Permanent	Provisional	Named after	Date	Site	Discoverer(s)	Category	Diam.	Ref
850601	2007 FQ_{52}	—	March 20, 2007	Mount Lemmon	Mount Lemmon Survey	·	840 m	MPC · JPL
850602	2007 FE_{53}	—	March 26, 2007	Mount Lemmon	Mount Lemmon Survey	·	890 m	MPC · JPL
850603	2007 FB_{57}	—	March 16, 2007	Mount Lemmon	Mount Lemmon Survey	·	650 m	MPC · JPL
850604	2007 FG_{57}	—	March 25, 2007	Mount Lemmon	Mount Lemmon Survey	·	2.2 km	MPC · JPL
850605	2007 FP_{57}	—	March 11, 2011	Mount Lemmon	Mount Lemmon Survey	·	1.1 km	MPC · JPL
850606	2007 FJ_{58}	—	March 19, 2017	Haleakala	Pan-STARRS 1	·	460 m	MPC · JPL
850607	2007 FM_{59}	—	March 20, 2007	Mount Lemmon	Mount Lemmon Survey	L5	6.2 km	MPC · JPL
850608	2007 FA_{61}	—	March 26, 2007	Kitt Peak	Spacewatch	·	520 m	MPC · JPL
850609	2007 FE_{61}	—	March 26, 2007	Kitt Peak	Spacewatch	·	2.2 km	MPC · JPL
850610	2007 FQ_{62}	—	March 25, 2007	Mount Lemmon	Mount Lemmon Survey	·	1.9 km	MPC · JPL
850611	2007 FS_{63}	—	March 26, 2007	Mount Lemmon	Mount Lemmon Survey	·	2.0 km	MPC · JPL
850612	2007 FJ_{64}	—	March 25, 2007	Mount Lemmon	Mount Lemmon Survey	·	1.9 km	MPC · JPL
850613	2007 FO_{64}	—	March 19, 2007	Mount Lemmon	Mount Lemmon Survey	·	1.3 km	MPC · JPL
850614	2007 FE_{65}	—	March 26, 2007	Mount Lemmon	Mount Lemmon Survey	·	2.0 km	MPC · JPL
850615	2007 GF_{6}	—	April 14, 2007	Wildberg	R. Apitzsch	·	2.3 km	MPC · JPL
850616	2007 GR_{8}	—	April 7, 2007	Mount Lemmon	Mount Lemmon Survey	·	2.0 km	MPC · JPL
850617	2007 GA_{20}	—	April 11, 2007	Kitt Peak	Spacewatch	·	950 m	MPC · JPL
850618	2007 GX_{21}	—	April 11, 2007	Mount Lemmon	Mount Lemmon Survey	·	460 m	MPC · JPL
850619	2007 GL_{27}	—	April 14, 2007	Kitt Peak	Spacewatch	·	1.4 km	MPC · JPL
850620	2007 GS_{30}	—	April 14, 2007	Mount Lemmon	Mount Lemmon Survey	·	1.8 km	MPC · JPL
850621	2007 GS_{40}	—	April 14, 2007	Kitt Peak	Spacewatch	·	690 m	MPC · JPL
850622	2007 GV_{41}	—	April 14, 2007	Kitt Peak	Spacewatch	·	2.3 km	MPC · JPL
850623	2007 GH_{43}	—	April 14, 2007	Mount Lemmon	Mount Lemmon Survey	·	550 m	MPC · JPL
850624	2007 GP_{54}	—	April 15, 2007	Kitt Peak	Spacewatch	·	1.1 km	MPC · JPL
850625	2007 GV_{57}	—	April 15, 2007	Kitt Peak	Spacewatch	·	950 m	MPC · JPL
850626	2007 GV_{59}	—	April 15, 2007	Kitt Peak	Spacewatch	·	490 m	MPC · JPL
850627	2007 GD_{64}	—	April 15, 2007	Kitt Peak	Spacewatch	·	490 m	MPC · JPL
850628	2007 GK_{66}	—	April 15, 2007	Kitt Peak	Spacewatch	·	610 m	MPC · JPL
850629	2007 GV_{70}	—	April 15, 2007	Mount Lemmon	Mount Lemmon Survey	EUN	750 m	MPC · JPL
850630	2007 GW_{71}	—	April 7, 2007	Mauna Kea	D. D. Balam, K. M. Perrett	(32418)	1.5 km	MPC · JPL
850631	2007 GZ_{79}	—	April 7, 2007	Mount Lemmon	Mount Lemmon Survey	·	550 m	MPC · JPL
850632	2007 GA_{80}	—	March 29, 2012	Mount Lemmon	Mount Lemmon Survey	·	1.2 km	MPC · JPL
850633	2007 GG_{80}	—	April 14, 2007	Kitt Peak	Spacewatch	·	2.0 km	MPC · JPL
850634	2007 GN_{81}	—	April 7, 2007	Mount Lemmon	Mount Lemmon Survey	THM	1.7 km	MPC · JPL
850635	2007 GS_{81}	—	April 15, 2007	Kitt Peak	Spacewatch	·	820 m	MPC · JPL
850636	2007 HD_{4}	—	April 18, 2007	Kitami	K. Endate	·	900 m	MPC · JPL
850637	2007 HA_{12}	—	April 18, 2007	Mount Lemmon	Mount Lemmon Survey	NYS	680 m	MPC · JPL
850638	2007 HG_{19}	—	April 18, 2007	Kitt Peak	Spacewatch	·	910 m	MPC · JPL
850639	2007 HN_{19}	—	October 20, 2003	Kitt Peak	Spacewatch	LIX	3.0 km	MPC · JPL
850640	2007 HB_{21}	—	March 15, 2007	Mount Lemmon	Mount Lemmon Survey	·	520 m	MPC · JPL
850641	2007 HO_{22}	—	April 18, 2007	Kitt Peak	Spacewatch	MAR	700 m	MPC · JPL
850642	2007 HQ_{23}	—	April 18, 2007	Kitt Peak	Spacewatch	·	1.3 km	MPC · JPL
850643	2007 HY_{23}	—	April 11, 2007	Mount Lemmon	Mount Lemmon Survey	·	2.3 km	MPC · JPL
850644	2007 HE_{26}	—	April 18, 2007	Mount Lemmon	Mount Lemmon Survey	·	1.4 km	MPC · JPL
850645	2007 HD_{27}	—	April 18, 2007	Mount Lemmon	Mount Lemmon Survey	LIX	2.8 km	MPC · JPL
850646	2007 HN_{30}	—	April 19, 2007	Mount Lemmon	Mount Lemmon Survey	·	2.1 km	MPC · JPL
850647	2007 HP_{33}	—	April 11, 2007	Kitt Peak	Spacewatch	·	1.1 km	MPC · JPL
850648	2007 HE_{42}	—	March 17, 2007	Kitt Peak	Spacewatch	NYS	770 m	MPC · JPL
850649	2007 HV_{56}	—	April 14, 2007	Kitt Peak	Spacewatch	·	960 m	MPC · JPL
850650	2007 HC_{60}	—	April 18, 2007	Mount Lemmon	Mount Lemmon Survey	·	780 m	MPC · JPL
850651	2007 HZ_{71}	—	April 22, 2007	Kitt Peak	Spacewatch	·	930 m	MPC · JPL
850652	2007 HC_{82}	—	April 25, 2007	Kitt Peak	Spacewatch	·	1.1 km	MPC · JPL
850653	2007 HZ_{84}	—	April 24, 2007	Kitt Peak	Spacewatch	·	2.3 km	MPC · JPL
850654	2007 HO_{86}	—	April 14, 2007	Kitt Peak	Spacewatch	·	480 m	MPC · JPL
850655	2007 HM_{93}	—	April 23, 2007	Mount Graham	Trilling, D. E.	·	660 m	MPC · JPL
850656	2007 HT_{94}	—	March 14, 2007	Mount Lemmon	Mount Lemmon Survey	·	2.3 km	MPC · JPL
850657	2007 HM_{100}	—	April 25, 2007	Mount Lemmon	Mount Lemmon Survey	·	1.4 km	MPC · JPL
850658	2007 HV_{102}	—	May 10, 2014	Haleakala	Pan-STARRS 1	·	490 m	MPC · JPL
850659	2007 HX_{103}	—	March 31, 2011	Haleakala	Pan-STARRS 1	·	970 m	MPC · JPL
850660	2007 HB_{106}	—	April 23, 2018	Mount Lemmon	Mount Lemmon Survey	·	1.8 km	MPC · JPL
850661	2007 HY_{106}	—	September 8, 2015	Haleakala	Pan-STARRS 1	·	1.0 km	MPC · JPL
850662	2007 HY_{107}	—	April 5, 2011	Catalina	CSS	·	1.1 km	MPC · JPL
850663	2007 HH_{108}	—	April 23, 2007	Kitt Peak	Spacewatch	·	1.8 km	MPC · JPL
850664	2007 HR_{108}	—	April 18, 2007	Kitt Peak	Spacewatch	·	690 m	MPC · JPL
850665	2007 HS_{109}	—	June 5, 2011	Mount Lemmon	Mount Lemmon Survey	·	850 m	MPC · JPL
850666	2007 HX_{109}	—	April 24, 2007	Mount Lemmon	Mount Lemmon Survey	·	530 m	MPC · JPL
850667	2007 HA_{110}	—	May 13, 2011	Kitt Peak	Spacewatch	·	840 m	MPC · JPL
850668	2007 HG_{110}	—	April 23, 2007	Mount Lemmon	Mount Lemmon Survey	·	2.5 km	MPC · JPL
850669	2007 HV_{110}	—	April 25, 2007	Kitt Peak	Spacewatch	·	2.1 km	MPC · JPL
850670	2007 HY_{110}	—	April 23, 2007	Mount Lemmon	Mount Lemmon Survey	·	2.5 km	MPC · JPL
850671	2007 HA_{111}	—	April 24, 2007	Mount Lemmon	Mount Lemmon Survey	H	440 m	MPC · JPL
850672	2007 HC_{111}	—	April 18, 2007	Kitt Peak	Spacewatch	·	460 m	MPC · JPL
850673	2007 HD_{111}	—	April 19, 2007	Kitt Peak	Spacewatch	·	460 m	MPC · JPL
850674	2007 HO_{112}	—	April 19, 2007	Kitt Peak	Spacewatch	·	1.0 km	MPC · JPL
850675	2007 HV_{114}	—	April 18, 2007	Mount Lemmon	Mount Lemmon Survey	·	1.9 km	MPC · JPL
850676	2007 HJ_{115}	—	April 24, 2007	Kitt Peak	Spacewatch	MAR	740 m	MPC · JPL
850677	2007 HW_{115}	—	April 26, 2007	Kitt Peak	Spacewatch	·	2.4 km	MPC · JPL
850678	2007 HB_{116}	—	April 25, 2007	Kitt Peak	Spacewatch	·	560 m	MPC · JPL
850679	2007 HQ_{116}	—	April 18, 2007	Mount Lemmon	Mount Lemmon Survey	(116763)	1.3 km	MPC · JPL
850680	2007 HW_{117}	—	April 25, 2007	Kitt Peak	Spacewatch	·	920 m	MPC · JPL
850681	2007 HY_{117}	—	April 25, 2007	Mount Lemmon	Mount Lemmon Survey	·	2.6 km	MPC · JPL
850682	2007 JA_{2}	—	April 24, 2007	Mount Lemmon	Mount Lemmon Survey	PHO	690 m	MPC · JPL
850683	2007 JE_{4}	—	April 15, 2007	Kitt Peak	Spacewatch	·	840 m	MPC · JPL
850684	2007 JT_{12}	—	May 7, 2007	Kitt Peak	Spacewatch	·	960 m	MPC · JPL
850685	2007 JU_{14}	—	April 19, 2007	Kitt Peak	Spacewatch	·	490 m	MPC · JPL
850686	2007 JE_{19}	—	March 26, 2007	Mount Lemmon	Mount Lemmon Survey	·	420 m	MPC · JPL
850687	2007 JZ_{21}	—	March 16, 2007	Mount Lemmon	Mount Lemmon Survey	·	2.3 km	MPC · JPL
850688	2007 JK_{24}	—	April 24, 2007	Mount Lemmon	Mount Lemmon Survey	PHO	580 m	MPC · JPL
850689	2007 JZ_{29}	—	May 11, 2007	Mount Lemmon	Mount Lemmon Survey	NYS	790 m	MPC · JPL
850690	2007 JO_{37}	—	April 24, 2007	Mount Lemmon	Mount Lemmon Survey	·	2.1 km	MPC · JPL
850691	2007 JZ_{46}	—	May 11, 2007	Mount Lemmon	Mount Lemmon Survey	·	2.3 km	MPC · JPL
850692	2007 JM_{48}	—	April 20, 2012	Mount Lemmon	Mount Lemmon Survey	·	1.3 km	MPC · JPL
850693	2007 JT_{48}	—	October 11, 2012	Mount Lemmon	Mount Lemmon Survey	·	980 m	MPC · JPL
850694	2007 JV_{49}	—	September 24, 2014	Mount Lemmon	Mount Lemmon Survey	·	1.8 km	MPC · JPL
850695	2007 JO_{50}	—	September 19, 2014	Haleakala	Pan-STARRS 1	THM	1.6 km	MPC · JPL
850696	2007 JH_{51}	—	May 9, 2014	Haleakala	Pan-STARRS 1	·	470 m	MPC · JPL
850697	2007 JY_{52}	—	May 13, 2007	Mount Lemmon	Mount Lemmon Survey	·	1.7 km	MPC · JPL
850698	2007 KS_{10}	—	July 12, 2015	Haleakala	Pan-STARRS 1	V	510 m	MPC · JPL
850699	2007 KB_{11}	—	October 8, 2012	Haleakala	Pan-STARRS 1	(1547)	1.4 km	MPC · JPL
850700	2007 KK_{11}	—	May 14, 2018	Mount Lemmon	Mount Lemmon Survey	THB	2.6 km	MPC · JPL

== 850701–850800 ==
back to top

Designation			Discovery			Properties		Ref
Permanent	Provisional	Named after	Date	Site	Discoverer(s)	Category	Diam.	Ref
850701	2007 LR_{5}	—	May 12, 2007	Mount Lemmon	Mount Lemmon Survey	·	660 m	MPC · JPL
850702	2007 LR_{7}	—	April 24, 2007	Mount Lemmon	Mount Lemmon Survey	THB	2.5 km	MPC · JPL
850703	2007 LP_{10}	—	June 9, 2007	Kitt Peak	Spacewatch	·	2.1 km	MPC · JPL
850704	2007 LM_{11}	—	June 9, 2007	Kitt Peak	Spacewatch	·	570 m	MPC · JPL
850705	2007 LS_{15}	—	April 25, 2007	Kitt Peak	Spacewatch	·	1.3 km	MPC · JPL
850706	2007 LH_{21}	—	May 13, 2007	Kitt Peak	Spacewatch	·	840 m	MPC · JPL
850707	2007 LV_{23}	—	June 10, 2007	Kitt Peak	Spacewatch	THB	2.3 km	MPC · JPL
850708	2007 LC_{24}	—	May 13, 2007	Mount Lemmon	Mount Lemmon Survey	·	610 m	MPC · JPL
850709	2007 LZ_{31}	—	June 15, 2007	Kitt Peak	Spacewatch	·	2.4 km	MPC · JPL
850710	2007 LO_{34}	—	March 25, 2007	Mount Lemmon	Mount Lemmon Survey	THB	1.9 km	MPC · JPL
850711	2007 LT_{39}	—	March 17, 2012	Mount Lemmon	Mount Lemmon Survey	·	2.0 km	MPC · JPL
850712	2007 MU_{1}	—	April 25, 2007	Mount Lemmon	Mount Lemmon Survey	H	300 m	MPC · JPL
850713	2007 MQ_{2}	—	June 16, 2007	Kitt Peak	Spacewatch	·	1.2 km	MPC · JPL
850714	2007 MT_{4}	—	June 13, 2007	Kitt Peak	Spacewatch	·	2.1 km	MPC · JPL
850715	2007 MZ_{10}	—	June 21, 2007	Mount Lemmon	Mount Lemmon Survey	·	950 m	MPC · JPL
850716	2007 MV_{14}	—	June 20, 2007	Kitt Peak	Spacewatch	·	770 m	MPC · JPL
850717	2007 MN_{20}	—	June 23, 2007	Kitt Peak	Spacewatch	TIR	2.2 km	MPC · JPL
850718	2007 MK_{23}	—	June 22, 2007	Kitt Peak	Spacewatch	·	710 m	MPC · JPL
850719	2007 MJ_{28}	—	November 27, 2013	Haleakala	Pan-STARRS 1	·	1.0 km	MPC · JPL
850720	2007 MX_{28}	—	November 23, 2014	Haleakala	Pan-STARRS 1	TIR	2.2 km	MPC · JPL
850721	2007 MW_{29}	—	June 16, 2018	Haleakala	Pan-STARRS 1	·	2.2 km	MPC · JPL
850722	2007 ME_{30}	—	June 13, 2018	Haleakala	Pan-STARRS 1	·	2.2 km	MPC · JPL
850723	2007 MN_{30}	—	June 17, 2007	Kitt Peak	Spacewatch	·	990 m	MPC · JPL
850724	2007 OC_{2}	—	July 19, 2007	Socorro	LINEAR	·	970 m	MPC · JPL
850725	2007 OK_{11}	—	July 18, 2007	Mount Lemmon	Mount Lemmon Survey	·	1.1 km	MPC · JPL
850726	2007 PY_{12}	—	June 23, 2007	Siding Spring	SSS	·	1.6 km	MPC · JPL
850727	2007 PG_{23}	—	June 20, 2007	Siding Spring	SSS	·	1.3 km	MPC · JPL
850728	2007 PM_{41}	—	August 8, 2007	Mauna Kea	D. D. Balam, K. M. Perrett	·	2.2 km	MPC · JPL
850729	2007 PY_{41}	—	August 9, 2007	Socorro	LINEAR	·	1.3 km	MPC · JPL
850730	2007 PC_{47}	—	August 10, 2007	Kitt Peak	Spacewatch	·	600 m	MPC · JPL
850731	2007 PS_{50}	—	August 11, 2007	Anderson Mesa	LONEOS	·	650 m	MPC · JPL
850732	2007 PE_{52}	—	August 10, 2007	Kitt Peak	Spacewatch	EUN	940 m	MPC · JPL
850733	2007 PK_{52}	—	August 10, 2007	Kitt Peak	Spacewatch	·	1.9 km	MPC · JPL
850734	2007 PM_{52}	—	August 8, 2007	Siding Spring	SSS	·	890 m	MPC · JPL
850735	2007 PF_{53}	—	August 10, 2007	Kitt Peak	Spacewatch	·	570 m	MPC · JPL
850736	2007 PL_{53}	—	August 9, 2007	Kitt Peak	Spacewatch	·	1.5 km	MPC · JPL
850737	2007 PN_{53}	—	August 10, 2007	Kitt Peak	Spacewatch	·	2.6 km	MPC · JPL
850738	2007 PS_{53}	—	August 10, 2007	Kitt Peak	Spacewatch	·	1.2 km	MPC · JPL
850739	2007 PW_{53}	—	August 10, 2007	Kitt Peak	Spacewatch	·	1.1 km	MPC · JPL
850740	2007 PE_{54}	—	August 10, 2007	Kitt Peak	Spacewatch	·	1.2 km	MPC · JPL
850741	2007 PQ_{54}	—	August 10, 2007	Kitt Peak	Spacewatch	·	890 m	MPC · JPL
850742	2007 QE_{7}	—	August 13, 2007	Socorro	LINEAR	·	1.8 km	MPC · JPL
850743	2007 QU_{15}	—	August 16, 2007	XuYi	PMO NEO Survey Program	·	1.3 km	MPC · JPL
850744	2007 QX_{17}	—	August 24, 2007	Kitt Peak	Spacewatch	·	1.5 km	MPC · JPL
850745	2007 QZ_{18}	—	August 23, 2007	Kitt Peak	Spacewatch	NYS	720 m	MPC · JPL
850746	2007 QV_{19}	—	August 23, 2007	Kitt Peak	Spacewatch	THM	1.7 km	MPC · JPL
850747	2007 QN_{20}	—	August 24, 2007	Kitt Peak	Spacewatch	·	1.3 km	MPC · JPL
850748	2007 QX_{20}	—	August 22, 2007	Kitt Peak	Spacewatch	·	2.1 km	MPC · JPL
850749	2007 RA_{4}	—	September 3, 2007	Catalina	CSS	·	2.8 km	MPC · JPL
850750	2007 RK_{8}	—	September 8, 2007	Anderson Mesa	LONEOS	·	2.0 km	MPC · JPL
850751	2007 RQ_{8}	—	September 4, 2007	Catalina	CSS	·	790 m	MPC · JPL
850752	2007 RV_{20}	—	August 23, 2007	Kitt Peak	Spacewatch	·	2.1 km	MPC · JPL
850753	2007 RR_{24}	—	February 8, 2002	Kitt Peak	Spacewatch	·	1.5 km	MPC · JPL
850754	2007 RC_{25}	—	September 4, 2007	Mount Lemmon	Mount Lemmon Survey	·	2.7 km	MPC · JPL
850755	2007 RG_{25}	—	September 4, 2007	Mount Lemmon	Mount Lemmon Survey	·	1.5 km	MPC · JPL
850756	2007 RN_{25}	—	September 4, 2007	Mount Lemmon	Mount Lemmon Survey	MAS	450 m	MPC · JPL
850757	2007 RK_{27}	—	August 12, 2007	Eygalayes	Sogorb, P.	JUN	810 m	MPC · JPL
850758	2007 RO_{28}	—	August 16, 2007	XuYi	PMO NEO Survey Program	·	500 m	MPC · JPL
850759	2007 RV_{30}	—	September 5, 2007	Catalina	CSS	·	1.4 km	MPC · JPL
850760	2007 RD_{35}	—	August 10, 2007	Kitt Peak	Spacewatch	·	730 m	MPC · JPL
850761	2007 RM_{45}	—	September 9, 2007	Kitt Peak	Spacewatch	·	1.5 km	MPC · JPL
850762	2007 RW_{45}	—	September 9, 2007	Kitt Peak	Spacewatch	MRX	720 m	MPC · JPL
850763	2007 RP_{50}	—	September 9, 2007	Kitt Peak	Spacewatch	·	1.3 km	MPC · JPL
850764	2007 RT_{52}	—	September 9, 2007	Kitt Peak	Spacewatch	·	460 m	MPC · JPL
850765	2007 RW_{54}	—	September 9, 2007	Kitt Peak	Spacewatch	·	1.0 km	MPC · JPL
850766	2007 RA_{55}	—	September 9, 2007	Kitt Peak	Spacewatch	·	1.6 km	MPC · JPL
850767	2007 RW_{55}	—	September 9, 2007	Kitt Peak	Spacewatch	·	990 m	MPC · JPL
850768	2007 RA_{56}	—	September 9, 2007	Kitt Peak	Spacewatch	·	900 m	MPC · JPL
850769	2007 RP_{59}	—	September 10, 2007	Mount Lemmon	Mount Lemmon Survey	·	1.6 km	MPC · JPL
850770	2007 RG_{61}	—	September 10, 2007	Mount Lemmon	Mount Lemmon Survey	·	2.0 km	MPC · JPL
850771	2007 RJ_{61}	—	January 30, 2006	Kitt Peak	Spacewatch	·	530 m	MPC · JPL
850772	2007 RA_{66}	—	September 10, 2007	Mount Lemmon	Mount Lemmon Survey	·	550 m	MPC · JPL
850773	2007 RT_{66}	—	September 10, 2007	Mount Lemmon	Mount Lemmon Survey	THM	1.7 km	MPC · JPL
850774	2007 RR_{73}	—	July 11, 2016	Haleakala	Pan-STARRS 1	·	1.3 km	MPC · JPL
850775	2007 RE_{76}	—	August 10, 2007	Kitt Peak	Spacewatch	·	1.6 km	MPC · JPL
850776	2007 RD_{77}	—	September 10, 2007	Mount Lemmon	Mount Lemmon Survey	·	970 m	MPC · JPL
850777	2007 RX_{77}	—	September 10, 2007	Mount Lemmon	Mount Lemmon Survey	NYS	580 m	MPC · JPL
850778	2007 RB_{82}	—	September 10, 2007	Mount Lemmon	Mount Lemmon Survey	·	1.1 km	MPC · JPL
850779	2007 RL_{88}	—	September 10, 2007	Mount Lemmon	Mount Lemmon Survey	·	1.1 km	MPC · JPL
850780	2007 RV_{88}	—	September 10, 2007	Mount Lemmon	Mount Lemmon Survey	AGN	870 m	MPC · JPL
850781	2007 RH_{92}	—	September 10, 2007	Mount Lemmon	Mount Lemmon Survey	·	1.4 km	MPC · JPL
850782	2007 RR_{97}	—	September 10, 2007	Kitt Peak	Spacewatch	·	1.4 km	MPC · JPL
850783	2007 RH_{98}	—	September 10, 2007	Kitt Peak	Spacewatch	·	620 m	MPC · JPL
850784	2007 RR_{100}	—	September 11, 2007	Mount Lemmon	Mount Lemmon Survey	AEO	660 m	MPC · JPL
850785	2007 RS_{102}	—	September 11, 2007	Mount Lemmon	Mount Lemmon Survey	NYS	760 m	MPC · JPL
850786	2007 RM_{103}	—	September 11, 2007	Catalina	CSS	·	1.6 km	MPC · JPL
850787	2007 RC_{104}	—	September 11, 2007	Mount Lemmon	Mount Lemmon Survey	·	990 m	MPC · JPL
850788	2007 RX_{104}	—	August 10, 2007	Kitt Peak	Spacewatch	·	570 m	MPC · JPL
850789	2007 RG_{106}	—	August 10, 2007	Kitt Peak	Spacewatch	·	970 m	MPC · JPL
850790	2007 RN_{106}	—	September 11, 2007	Mount Lemmon	Mount Lemmon Survey	·	670 m	MPC · JPL
850791	2007 RN_{108}	—	September 11, 2007	Kitt Peak	Spacewatch	·	660 m	MPC · JPL
850792	2007 RH_{109}	—	September 11, 2007	Kitt Peak	Spacewatch	·	670 m	MPC · JPL
850793	2007 RA_{110}	—	September 11, 2007	Mount Lemmon	Mount Lemmon Survey	·	700 m	MPC · JPL
850794	2007 RE_{110}	—	September 11, 2007	Mount Lemmon	Mount Lemmon Survey	·	810 m	MPC · JPL
850795	2007 RG_{114}	—	September 11, 2007	Kitt Peak	Spacewatch	·	1.2 km	MPC · JPL
850796	2007 RE_{121}	—	September 12, 2007	Mount Lemmon	Mount Lemmon Survey	·	560 m	MPC · JPL
850797	2007 RW_{124}	—	September 12, 2007	Mount Lemmon	Mount Lemmon Survey	·	2.3 km	MPC · JPL
850798	2007 RZ_{124}	—	September 12, 2007	Mount Lemmon	Mount Lemmon Survey	·	1.3 km	MPC · JPL
850799	2007 RQ_{126}	—	September 12, 2007	Mount Lemmon	Mount Lemmon Survey	NYS	600 m	MPC · JPL
850800	2007 RB_{127}	—	September 12, 2007	Mount Lemmon	Mount Lemmon Survey	EUN	750 m	MPC · JPL

== 850801–850900 ==
back to top

Designation			Discovery			Properties		Ref
Permanent	Provisional	Named after	Date	Site	Discoverer(s)	Category	Diam.	Ref
850801	2007 RB_{130}	—	September 12, 2007	Mount Lemmon	Mount Lemmon Survey	NYS	810 m	MPC · JPL
850802	2007 RF_{131}	—	September 12, 2007	Kitt Peak	Spacewatch	·	370 m	MPC · JPL
850803	2007 RH_{131}	—	September 12, 2007	Kitt Peak	Spacewatch	PHO	630 m	MPC · JPL
850804	2007 RY_{131}	—	September 12, 2007	Mount Lemmon	Mount Lemmon Survey	·	580 m	MPC · JPL
850805	2007 RP_{135}	—	November 18, 1998	Roque de los Muchachos	A. Fitzsimmons, R. Budden	·	860 m	MPC · JPL
850806	2007 RV_{135}	—	September 13, 2007	Kitt Peak	Spacewatch	·	640 m	MPC · JPL
850807	2007 RQ_{144}	—	July 18, 2007	Mount Lemmon	Mount Lemmon Survey	·	910 m	MPC · JPL
850808	2007 RV_{147}	—	September 5, 2007	Catalina	CSS	·	1.4 km	MPC · JPL
850809	2007 RM_{150}	—	September 14, 2007	Catalina	CSS	T_{j} (2.86)	3.5 km	MPC · JPL
850810	2007 RF_{152}	—	August 24, 2007	Kitt Peak	Spacewatch	·	1.2 km	MPC · JPL
850811	2007 RR_{153}	—	August 10, 2007	Kitt Peak	Spacewatch	·	880 m	MPC · JPL
850812	2007 RV_{156}	—	August 12, 2007	XuYi	PMO NEO Survey Program	·	1.3 km	MPC · JPL
850813	2007 RL_{160}	—	September 12, 2007	Mount Lemmon	Mount Lemmon Survey	T_{j} (2.98)	2.0 km	MPC · JPL
850814	2007 RN_{160}	—	September 12, 2007	Mount Lemmon	Mount Lemmon Survey	·	1.3 km	MPC · JPL
850815	2007 RF_{163}	—	September 10, 2007	Kitt Peak	Spacewatch	·	1.3 km	MPC · JPL
850816	2007 RX_{163}	—	September 10, 2007	Kitt Peak	Spacewatch	·	1.8 km	MPC · JPL
850817	2007 RL_{165}	—	September 10, 2007	Kitt Peak	Spacewatch	NYS	890 m	MPC · JPL
850818	2007 RV_{167}	—	August 10, 2007	Kitt Peak	Spacewatch	·	540 m	MPC · JPL
850819	2007 RU_{173}	—	September 10, 2007	Kitt Peak	Spacewatch	·	560 m	MPC · JPL
850820	2007 RZ_{173}	—	September 10, 2007	Kitt Peak	Spacewatch	·	790 m	MPC · JPL
850821	2007 RJ_{174}	—	September 10, 2007	Kitt Peak	Spacewatch	·	1.2 km	MPC · JPL
850822	2007 RA_{175}	—	September 10, 2007	Kitt Peak	Spacewatch	·	1.3 km	MPC · JPL
850823	2007 RA_{176}	—	September 8, 2007	Mount Lemmon	Mount Lemmon Survey	·	500 m	MPC · JPL
850824	2007 RO_{178}	—	September 10, 2007	Kitt Peak	Spacewatch	·	1.4 km	MPC · JPL
850825	2007 RY_{180}	—	September 11, 2007	Mount Lemmon	Mount Lemmon Survey	·	1.5 km	MPC · JPL
850826	2007 RF_{183}	—	September 12, 2007	Mount Lemmon	Mount Lemmon Survey	·	930 m	MPC · JPL
850827	2007 RU_{183}	—	September 13, 2007	Catalina	CSS	·	1.5 km	MPC · JPL
850828	2007 RB_{186}	—	September 13, 2007	Mount Lemmon	Mount Lemmon Survey	·	2.0 km	MPC · JPL
850829	2007 RX_{188}	—	September 5, 2007	Anderson Mesa	LONEOS	·	1.9 km	MPC · JPL
850830	2007 RK_{189}	—	September 10, 2007	Kitt Peak	Spacewatch	·	1.2 km	MPC · JPL
850831	2007 RD_{192}	—	September 11, 2007	Kitt Peak	Spacewatch	·	930 m	MPC · JPL
850832	2007 RP_{197}	—	September 13, 2007	Mount Lemmon	Mount Lemmon Survey	·	1.2 km	MPC · JPL
850833	2007 RU_{200}	—	September 13, 2007	Kitt Peak	Spacewatch	·	1.9 km	MPC · JPL
850834	2007 RN_{201}	—	September 13, 2007	Kitt Peak	Spacewatch	·	450 m	MPC · JPL
850835	2007 RS_{205}	—	August 10, 2007	Kitt Peak	Spacewatch	(883)	520 m	MPC · JPL
850836	2007 RM_{213}	—	August 23, 2007	Kitt Peak	Spacewatch	·	930 m	MPC · JPL
850837	2007 RJ_{214}	—	September 12, 2007	Kitt Peak	Spacewatch	·	2.1 km	MPC · JPL
850838	2007 RL_{214}	—	September 12, 2007	Kitt Peak	Spacewatch	TIR	2.2 km	MPC · JPL
850839	2007 RW_{222}	—	September 14, 2007	Mount Lemmon	Mount Lemmon Survey	MIS	1.9 km	MPC · JPL
850840	2007 RF_{224}	—	September 10, 2007	Kitt Peak	Spacewatch	·	820 m	MPC · JPL
850841	2007 RV_{226}	—	September 10, 2007	Kitt Peak	Spacewatch	·	1.2 km	MPC · JPL
850842	2007 RA_{227}	—	September 10, 2007	Kitt Peak	Spacewatch	·	470 m	MPC · JPL
850843	2007 RB_{232}	—	September 11, 2007	Mount Lemmon	Mount Lemmon Survey	NYS	670 m	MPC · JPL
850844	2007 RZ_{234}	—	September 12, 2007	Mount Lemmon	Mount Lemmon Survey	NYS	770 m	MPC · JPL
850845	2007 RW_{240}	—	September 3, 2007	Catalina	CSS	·	850 m	MPC · JPL
850846	2007 RX_{240}	—	September 10, 2007	Catalina	CSS	·	540 m	MPC · JPL
850847	2007 RJ_{244}	—	September 11, 2007	Mount Lemmon	Mount Lemmon Survey	·	1.9 km	MPC · JPL
850848	2007 RB_{252}	—	September 13, 2007	Kitt Peak	Spacewatch	·	1.4 km	MPC · JPL
850849	2007 RU_{252}	—	September 13, 2007	Mount Lemmon	Mount Lemmon Survey	·	1.7 km	MPC · JPL
850850	2007 RQ_{256}	—	September 14, 2007	Kitt Peak	Spacewatch	MAS	540 m	MPC · JPL
850851	2007 RN_{264}	—	September 15, 2007	Mount Lemmon	Mount Lemmon Survey	·	590 m	MPC · JPL
850852	2007 RX_{265}	—	August 23, 2007	Kitt Peak	Spacewatch	NYS	700 m	MPC · JPL
850853	2007 RA_{273}	—	September 15, 2007	Kitt Peak	Spacewatch	NEM	1.5 km	MPC · JPL
850854	2007 RK_{273}	—	September 15, 2007	Kitt Peak	Spacewatch	·	700 m	MPC · JPL
850855	2007 RK_{287}	—	September 9, 2007	Mount Lemmon	Mount Lemmon Survey	·	370 m	MPC · JPL
850856	2007 RE_{293}	—	September 13, 2007	Mount Lemmon	Mount Lemmon Survey	·	640 m	MPC · JPL
850857	2007 RY_{294}	—	September 14, 2007	Mount Lemmon	Mount Lemmon Survey	·	700 m	MPC · JPL
850858	2007 RB_{298}	—	September 5, 2007	Mount Lemmon	Mount Lemmon Survey	·	600 m	MPC · JPL
850859	2007 RT_{300}	—	September 12, 2007	Mount Lemmon	Mount Lemmon Survey	·	1.5 km	MPC · JPL
850860	2007 RX_{300}	—	September 12, 2007	Mount Lemmon	Mount Lemmon Survey	·	670 m	MPC · JPL
850861	2007 RZ_{308}	—	September 9, 2007	Kitt Peak	Spacewatch	·	810 m	MPC · JPL
850862	2007 RS_{314}	—	September 3, 2007	Catalina	CSS	·	670 m	MPC · JPL
850863	2007 RY_{315}	—	September 13, 2007	Catalina	CSS	TIR	2.7 km	MPC · JPL
850864	2007 RE_{320}	—	September 13, 2007	Kitt Peak	Spacewatch	·	560 m	MPC · JPL
850865	2007 RO_{322}	—	September 13, 2007	Catalina	CSS	·	760 m	MPC · JPL
850866	2007 RM_{323}	—	September 5, 2007	Mount Lemmon	Mount Lemmon Survey	·	1.2 km	MPC · JPL
850867	2007 RN_{324}	—	September 9, 2007	Mount Lemmon	Mount Lemmon Survey	·	1.2 km	MPC · JPL
850868	2007 RO_{328}	—	September 11, 2007	Kitt Peak	Spacewatch	·	1.2 km	MPC · JPL
850869	2007 RU_{328}	—	September 15, 2007	Kitt Peak	Spacewatch	·	760 m	MPC · JPL
850870	2007 RA_{330}	—	September 10, 2007	Mount Lemmon	Mount Lemmon Survey	ERI	940 m	MPC · JPL
850871	2007 RC_{332}	—	September 13, 2007	Mount Lemmon	Mount Lemmon Survey	·	1.2 km	MPC · JPL
850872	2007 RL_{334}	—	September 11, 2007	Kitt Peak	Spacewatch	·	500 m	MPC · JPL
850873	2007 RS_{334}	—	September 10, 2007	Kitt Peak	Spacewatch	·	740 m	MPC · JPL
850874	2007 RZ_{334}	—	September 15, 2007	Mount Lemmon	Mount Lemmon Survey	·	1.3 km	MPC · JPL
850875	2007 RS_{335}	—	September 13, 2007	Mount Lemmon	Mount Lemmon Survey	MIS	2.0 km	MPC · JPL
850876	2007 RN_{336}	—	October 19, 2011	Mount Lemmon	Mount Lemmon Survey	·	700 m	MPC · JPL
850877	2007 RC_{337}	—	October 10, 2012	Kitt Peak	Spacewatch	·	1.3 km	MPC · JPL
850878	2007 RH_{340}	—	December 30, 2011	Mount Lemmon	Mount Lemmon Survey	·	770 m	MPC · JPL
850879	2007 RP_{340}	—	September 13, 2007	Kitt Peak	Spacewatch	·	2.5 km	MPC · JPL
850880	2007 RF_{341}	—	May 21, 2015	Haleakala	Pan-STARRS 1	·	830 m	MPC · JPL
850881	2007 RP_{341}	—	November 17, 2011	Kitt Peak	Spacewatch	·	660 m	MPC · JPL
850882	2007 RT_{342}	—	January 24, 2014	Haleakala	Pan-STARRS 1	H	370 m	MPC · JPL
850883	2007 RK_{343}	—	September 11, 2007	Kitt Peak	Spacewatch	·	630 m	MPC · JPL
850884	2007 RG_{344}	—	September 11, 2007	Mount Lemmon	Mount Lemmon Survey	NYS	850 m	MPC · JPL
850885	2007 RJ_{344}	—	September 10, 2007	Mount Lemmon	Mount Lemmon Survey	·	710 m	MPC · JPL
850886	2007 RN_{344}	—	December 1, 2011	Haleakala	Pan-STARRS 1	·	650 m	MPC · JPL
850887	2007 RT_{344}	—	September 13, 2007	Mount Lemmon	Mount Lemmon Survey	·	670 m	MPC · JPL
850888	2007 RT_{345}	—	September 12, 2007	Mount Lemmon	Mount Lemmon Survey	·	1.1 km	MPC · JPL
850889	2007 RB_{346}	—	September 12, 2007	Catalina	CSS	·	670 m	MPC · JPL
850890	2007 RF_{346}	—	September 14, 2007	Kitt Peak	Spacewatch	MIS	1.7 km	MPC · JPL
850891	2007 RK_{346}	—	September 13, 2007	Mount Lemmon	Mount Lemmon Survey	MAS	450 m	MPC · JPL
850892	2007 RO_{346}	—	September 10, 2007	Mount Lemmon	Mount Lemmon Survey	MAS	450 m	MPC · JPL
850893	2007 RG_{347}	—	February 11, 2016	Haleakala	Pan-STARRS 1	VER	1.9 km	MPC · JPL
850894	2007 RQ_{349}	—	September 13, 2007	Mount Lemmon	Mount Lemmon Survey	·	700 m	MPC · JPL
850895	2007 RO_{351}	—	July 9, 2018	Haleakala	Pan-STARRS 1	VER	1.9 km	MPC · JPL
850896	2007 RP_{351}	—	September 12, 2013	Kitt Peak	Spacewatch	·	2.2 km	MPC · JPL
850897	2007 RV_{352}	—	September 14, 2007	Mount Lemmon	Mount Lemmon Survey	AGN	860 m	MPC · JPL
850898	2007 RA_{353}	—	September 11, 2007	Mount Lemmon	Mount Lemmon Survey	·	2.1 km	MPC · JPL
850899	2007 RV_{353}	—	September 10, 2007	Mount Lemmon	Mount Lemmon Survey	·	1.3 km	MPC · JPL
850900	2007 RX_{353}	—	July 11, 2007	Siding Spring	SSS	JUN	840 m	MPC · JPL

== 850901–851000 ==
back to top

Designation			Discovery			Properties		Ref
Permanent	Provisional	Named after	Date	Site	Discoverer(s)	Category	Diam.	Ref
850901	2007 RL_{354}	—	September 13, 2007	Mount Lemmon	Mount Lemmon Survey	·	410 m	MPC · JPL
850902	2007 RP_{355}	—	September 15, 2007	Mount Lemmon	Mount Lemmon Survey	EOS	1.3 km	MPC · JPL
850903	2007 RS_{355}	—	September 12, 2007	Mount Lemmon	Mount Lemmon Survey	·	850 m	MPC · JPL
850904	2007 RW_{355}	—	September 3, 2007	Catalina	CSS	·	680 m	MPC · JPL
850905	2007 RA_{356}	—	September 10, 2007	Kitt Peak	Spacewatch	·	870 m	MPC · JPL
850906	2007 RC_{356}	—	September 12, 2007	Kitt Peak	Spacewatch	·	1.4 km	MPC · JPL
850907	2007 RK_{357}	—	September 9, 2007	Mount Lemmon	Mount Lemmon Survey	·	1.2 km	MPC · JPL
850908	2007 RC_{358}	—	September 12, 2007	Mount Lemmon	Mount Lemmon Survey	EUN	930 m	MPC · JPL
850909	2007 RD_{358}	—	September 12, 2007	Mount Lemmon	Mount Lemmon Survey	·	1.2 km	MPC · JPL
850910	2007 RM_{358}	—	September 14, 2007	Mount Lemmon	Mount Lemmon Survey	PAD	1.1 km	MPC · JPL
850911	2007 RZ_{359}	—	September 13, 2007	Mount Lemmon	Mount Lemmon Survey	·	1.2 km	MPC · JPL
850912	2007 RL_{360}	—	September 4, 2007	Mount Lemmon	Mount Lemmon Survey	NYS	610 m	MPC · JPL
850913	2007 RY_{361}	—	September 4, 2007	Catalina	CSS	·	420 m	MPC · JPL
850914	2007 RQ_{362}	—	September 10, 2007	Mount Lemmon	Mount Lemmon Survey	·	1.2 km	MPC · JPL
850915	2007 RU_{362}	—	September 11, 2007	Kitt Peak	Spacewatch	·	450 m	MPC · JPL
850916	2007 RJ_{363}	—	September 15, 2007	Kitt Peak	Spacewatch	THB	2.5 km	MPC · JPL
850917	2007 RG_{364}	—	September 15, 2007	Kitt Peak	Spacewatch	EUN	630 m	MPC · JPL
850918	2007 RQ_{367}	—	September 12, 2007	Mount Lemmon	Mount Lemmon Survey	·	950 m	MPC · JPL
850919	2007 RQ_{368}	—	September 11, 2007	Mount Lemmon	Mount Lemmon Survey	·	1.3 km	MPC · JPL
850920	2007 RT_{368}	—	September 15, 2007	Mount Lemmon	Mount Lemmon Survey	EOS	1.3 km	MPC · JPL
850921	2007 RD_{370}	—	September 14, 2007	Mount Lemmon	Mount Lemmon Survey	·	1.1 km	MPC · JPL
850922	2007 RG_{370}	—	September 10, 2007	Kitt Peak	Spacewatch	·	1.1 km	MPC · JPL
850923	2007 RK_{371}	—	September 12, 2007	Kitt Peak	Spacewatch	TIR	1.9 km	MPC · JPL
850924	2007 RC_{376}	—	September 12, 2007	Kitt Peak	Spacewatch	EUN	860 m	MPC · JPL
850925	2007 RH_{376}	—	September 13, 2007	Mount Lemmon	Mount Lemmon Survey	MAS	480 m	MPC · JPL
850926	2007 RK_{376}	—	September 13, 2007	Kitt Peak	Spacewatch	·	2.2 km	MPC · JPL
850927	2007 RP_{376}	—	September 12, 2007	Mount Lemmon	Mount Lemmon Survey	·	1.3 km	MPC · JPL
850928	2007 RR_{376}	—	September 9, 2007	Mount Lemmon	Mount Lemmon Survey	·	1 km	MPC · JPL
850929	2007 RC_{377}	—	September 13, 2007	Mount Lemmon	Mount Lemmon Survey	MAS	460 m	MPC · JPL
850930	2007 RT_{377}	—	September 11, 2007	Mount Lemmon	Mount Lemmon Survey	·	1.0 km	MPC · JPL
850931	2007 RU_{377}	—	September 14, 2007	Mount Lemmon	Mount Lemmon Survey	·	520 m	MPC · JPL
850932	2007 RW_{377}	—	September 13, 2007	Kitt Peak	Spacewatch	THM	1.8 km	MPC · JPL
850933	2007 RT_{378}	—	September 12, 2007	Catalina	CSS	·	470 m	MPC · JPL
850934	2007 RZ_{381}	—	September 14, 2007	Mount Lemmon	Mount Lemmon Survey	·	1.9 km	MPC · JPL
850935	2007 RP_{386}	—	September 13, 2007	Mount Lemmon	Mount Lemmon Survey	·	1.2 km	MPC · JPL
850936	2007 RS_{386}	—	September 15, 2007	Kitt Peak	Spacewatch	·	1.2 km	MPC · JPL
850937	2007 SL_{6}	—	September 16, 2007	Lulin	LUSS	·	930 m	MPC · JPL
850938	2007 SP_{12}	—	September 14, 2007	Mount Lemmon	Mount Lemmon Survey	NYS	730 m	MPC · JPL
850939	2007 SY_{18}	—	September 19, 2007	Kitt Peak	Spacewatch	·	2.5 km	MPC · JPL
850940	2007 SK_{19}	—	September 18, 2007	Mount Lemmon	Mount Lemmon Survey	·	1.5 km	MPC · JPL
850941	2007 SH_{20}	—	September 18, 2007	Kitt Peak	Spacewatch	·	2.4 km	MPC · JPL
850942	2007 ST_{25}	—	September 20, 2007	Kitt Peak	Spacewatch	·	650 m	MPC · JPL
850943	2007 SW_{25}	—	December 11, 2012	Mount Lemmon	Mount Lemmon Survey	·	1.3 km	MPC · JPL
850944	2007 SA_{26}	—	August 20, 2001	Cerro Tololo	Deep Ecliptic Survey	·	2.5 km	MPC · JPL
850945	2007 SW_{26}	—	September 19, 2007	Kitt Peak	Spacewatch	NYS	720 m	MPC · JPL
850946	2007 SY_{26}	—	October 8, 2012	Haleakala	Pan-STARRS 1	GEF	850 m	MPC · JPL
850947	2007 ST_{27}	—	September 20, 2007	Kitt Peak	Spacewatch	·	460 m	MPC · JPL
850948	2007 SB_{28}	—	September 22, 2007	Bergisch Gladbach	W. Bickel	·	1.4 km	MPC · JPL
850949	2007 SO_{28}	—	September 20, 2007	Kitt Peak	Spacewatch	AEO	810 m	MPC · JPL
850950	2007 SC_{29}	—	September 19, 2007	Kitt Peak	Spacewatch	·	1.2 km	MPC · JPL
850951	2007 SA_{30}	—	September 18, 2007	Kitt Peak	Spacewatch	·	480 m	MPC · JPL
850952	2007 TK_{7}	—	October 7, 2007	Kitt Peak	Spacewatch	·	1.3 km	MPC · JPL
850953	2007 TG_{10}	—	September 11, 2007	Mount Lemmon	Mount Lemmon Survey	·	470 m	MPC · JPL
850954	2007 TW_{15}	—	October 7, 2007	Mount Lemmon	Mount Lemmon Survey	·	1.2 km	MPC · JPL
850955	2007 TO_{17}	—	October 8, 2007	Catalina	CSS	·	830 m	MPC · JPL
850956	2007 TG_{25}	—	October 8, 2007	Kitt Peak	Spacewatch	AMO	610 m	MPC · JPL
850957	2007 TT_{28}	—	October 4, 2007	Kitt Peak	Spacewatch	·	1.8 km	MPC · JPL
850958	2007 TC_{30}	—	October 4, 2007	Kitt Peak	Spacewatch	·	720 m	MPC · JPL
850959	2007 TL_{32}	—	October 6, 2007	Kitt Peak	Spacewatch	·	890 m	MPC · JPL
850960	2007 TK_{34}	—	October 6, 2007	Kitt Peak	Spacewatch	NYS	680 m	MPC · JPL
850961	2007 TY_{38}	—	September 12, 2007	Mount Lemmon	Mount Lemmon Survey	·	840 m	MPC · JPL
850962	2007 TC_{40}	—	September 12, 2007	Mount Lemmon	Mount Lemmon Survey	·	720 m	MPC · JPL
850963	2007 TC_{41}	—	October 6, 2007	Kitt Peak	Spacewatch	·	790 m	MPC · JPL
850964	2007 TL_{41}	—	October 6, 2007	Kitt Peak	Spacewatch	·	710 m	MPC · JPL
850965	2007 TW_{46}	—	October 4, 2007	Kitt Peak	Spacewatch	(8737)	2.1 km	MPC · JPL
850966	2007 TY_{46}	—	October 4, 2007	Kitt Peak	Spacewatch	·	480 m	MPC · JPL
850967	2007 TA_{50}	—	October 4, 2007	Kitt Peak	Spacewatch	·	1.3 km	MPC · JPL
850968	2007 TB_{50}	—	October 4, 2007	Kitt Peak	Spacewatch	·	1.5 km	MPC · JPL
850969	2007 TV_{52}	—	October 4, 2007	Kitt Peak	Spacewatch	·	1.0 km	MPC · JPL
850970	2007 TR_{53}	—	October 4, 2007	Kitt Peak	Spacewatch	PHO	750 m	MPC · JPL
850971	2007 TF_{59}	—	August 23, 2007	Kitt Peak	Spacewatch	·	700 m	MPC · JPL
850972	2007 TA_{64}	—	October 7, 2007	Mount Lemmon	Mount Lemmon Survey	·	370 m	MPC · JPL
850973	2007 TL_{64}	—	September 12, 2007	Mount Lemmon	Mount Lemmon Survey	·	900 m	MPC · JPL
850974	2007 TB_{67}	—	October 12, 2007	Dauban	C. Rinner, F. Kugel	·	2.1 km	MPC · JPL
850975	2007 TP_{67}	—	October 11, 2007	Kitt Peak	Spacewatch	·	430 m	MPC · JPL
850976	2007 TW_{68}	—	October 13, 2007	Kitt Peak	Spacewatch	AMO	500 m	MPC · JPL
850977	2007 TX_{69}	—	October 10, 2007	Anderson Mesa	LONEOS	JUN	930 m	MPC · JPL
850978	2007 TR_{71}	—	September 19, 2007	Kitt Peak	Spacewatch	·	710 m	MPC · JPL
850979	2007 TX_{71}	—	October 6, 2007	Bergisch Gladbach	W. Bickel	·	1.4 km	MPC · JPL
850980	2007 TQ_{72}	—	September 13, 2007	Mount Lemmon	Mount Lemmon Survey	·	450 m	MPC · JPL
850981	2007 TL_{77}	—	October 5, 2007	Kitt Peak	Spacewatch	·	720 m	MPC · JPL
850982	2007 TP_{80}	—	September 12, 2007	Mount Lemmon	Mount Lemmon Survey	·	910 m	MPC · JPL
850983	2007 TA_{81}	—	October 7, 2007	Mount Lemmon	Mount Lemmon Survey	·	650 m	MPC · JPL
850984	2007 TD_{82}	—	September 3, 2007	Catalina	CSS	·	1.9 km	MPC · JPL
850985	2007 TC_{84}	—	October 8, 2007	Kitt Peak	Spacewatch	·	1.1 km	MPC · JPL
850986	2007 TL_{84}	—	September 9, 2007	Mount Lemmon	Mount Lemmon Survey	·	1.3 km	MPC · JPL
850987	2007 TE_{85}	—	October 8, 2007	Mount Lemmon	Mount Lemmon Survey	·	700 m	MPC · JPL
850988	2007 TH_{85}	—	October 8, 2007	Mount Lemmon	Mount Lemmon Survey	·	530 m	MPC · JPL
850989	2007 TQ_{85}	—	October 8, 2007	Mount Lemmon	Mount Lemmon Survey	·	1.0 km	MPC · JPL
850990	2007 TZ_{85}	—	October 8, 2007	Mount Lemmon	Mount Lemmon Survey	·	1 km	MPC · JPL
850991	2007 TK_{96}	—	September 9, 2007	Mount Lemmon	Mount Lemmon Survey	·	440 m	MPC · JPL
850992	2007 TB_{101}	—	October 8, 2007	Mount Lemmon	Mount Lemmon Survey	·	1.1 km	MPC · JPL
850993	2007 TY_{101}	—	September 12, 2007	Mount Lemmon	Mount Lemmon Survey	THM	1.8 km	MPC · JPL
850994	2007 TZ_{102}	—	September 15, 2007	Mount Lemmon	Mount Lemmon Survey	·	750 m	MPC · JPL
850995	2007 TQ_{105}	—	October 11, 2007	Socorro	LINEAR	EUN	880 m	MPC · JPL
850996	2007 TO_{107}	—	September 12, 2007	Mount Lemmon	Mount Lemmon Survey	·	470 m	MPC · JPL
850997	2007 TA_{108}	—	October 6, 2007	Bergisch Gladbach	W. Bickel	·	2.0 km	MPC · JPL
850998	2007 TA_{110}	—	September 9, 2007	Kitt Peak	Spacewatch	·	450 m	MPC · JPL
850999	2007 TE_{116}	—	October 8, 2007	Mount Lemmon	Mount Lemmon Survey	·	810 m	MPC · JPL
851000	2007 TK_{117}	—	October 9, 2007	Kitt Peak	Spacewatch	·	1.1 km	MPC · JPL

back to top
