= List of minor planets: 626001–627000 =

The following is a partial list of minor planets, running from minor-planet number 626001 through 627000, inclusive. The primary data for this and other partial lists is based on JPL's "Small-Body Orbital Elements" and data available from the Minor Planet Center. Critical list information is also provided by the MPC, unless otherwise specified from Lowell Observatory. A detailed description of the table's columns and additional sources are given on the main page including a complete list of every page in this series, and a statistical break-up on the dynamical classification of minor planets.

Also see the summary list of all named bodies in numerical and alphabetical order, and the corresponding naming citations for the number range of this particular list. New namings may only be added to this list after official publication, as the preannouncement of names is condemned by the Working Group for Small Bodies Nomenclature of the International Astronomical Union.

Near-Earth obj.	MBA (inner)	MBA (outer)	Centaur
Mars-crosser	MBA (middle)	Jupiter trojan	Trans-Neptunian obj.
Unclassified

== 626001–626100 ==
Designation			Discovery			Properties		Ref
Permanent	Provisional	Named after	Date	Site	Discoverer(s)	Category	Diam.	Ref
626001	2006 UQ_{213}	—	October 23, 2006	Kitt Peak	Spacewatch	·	1.0 km	MPC · JPL
626002	2006 UJ_{216}	—	October 29, 2006	Kitami	K. Endate	·	560 m	MPC · JPL
626003	2006 UX_{216}	—	October 23, 2006	Mauna Kea	D. D. Balam	·	1.4 km	MPC · JPL
626004	2006 UU_{220}	—	September 25, 2006	Kitt Peak	Spacewatch	·	1.2 km	MPC · JPL
626005	2006 UG_{224}	—	October 19, 2006	Mount Lemmon	Mount Lemmon Survey	·	1.3 km	MPC · JPL
626006	2006 UN_{226}	—	September 19, 2006	Kitt Peak	Spacewatch	MIS	2.0 km	MPC · JPL
626007	2006 UY_{226}	—	October 22, 2006	Kitt Peak	Spacewatch	·	520 m	MPC · JPL
626008	2006 UU_{238}	—	October 23, 2006	Kitt Peak	Spacewatch	·	1.3 km	MPC · JPL
626009	2006 UD_{242}	—	September 27, 2006	Kitt Peak	Spacewatch	·	430 m	MPC · JPL
626010	2006 UP_{242}	—	October 21, 2006	Kitt Peak	Spacewatch	·	1.5 km	MPC · JPL
626011	2006 UC_{243}	—	September 18, 2006	Kitt Peak	Spacewatch	·	1.1 km	MPC · JPL
626012	2006 UD_{245}	—	September 25, 2006	Kitt Peak	Spacewatch	ADE	1.4 km	MPC · JPL
626013	2006 UU_{259}	—	October 20, 2006	Kitt Peak	Spacewatch	·	1.2 km	MPC · JPL
626014	2006 UN_{261}	—	October 28, 2006	Mount Lemmon	Mount Lemmon Survey	·	1.0 km	MPC · JPL
626015	2006 UL_{265}	—	October 3, 2006	Mount Lemmon	Mount Lemmon Survey	H	400 m	MPC · JPL
626016	2006 UJ_{269}	—	October 27, 2006	Mount Lemmon	Mount Lemmon Survey	·	1.3 km	MPC · JPL
626017	2006 UK_{275}	—	September 25, 2006	Kitt Peak	Spacewatch	·	1.1 km	MPC · JPL
626018	2006 UB_{286}	—	October 20, 2006	Kitt Peak	Spacewatch	·	1.2 km	MPC · JPL
626019	2006 UL_{295}	—	October 19, 2006	Kitt Peak	Deep Ecliptic Survey	·	690 m	MPC · JPL
626020	2006 UP_{301}	—	October 19, 2006	Kitt Peak	Deep Ecliptic Survey	·	450 m	MPC · JPL
626021	2006 UG_{319}	—	October 31, 2006	Mount Lemmon	Mount Lemmon Survey	·	1.6 km	MPC · JPL
626022	2006 UR_{320}	—	October 31, 2006	Mount Lemmon	Mount Lemmon Survey	·	520 m	MPC · JPL
626023	2006 UQ_{330}	—	October 16, 2006	Apache Point	SDSS Collaboration	·	1.8 km	MPC · JPL
626024	2006 UU_{334}	—	October 20, 2006	Mount Lemmon	Mount Lemmon Survey	·	600 m	MPC · JPL
626025	2006 UR_{336}	—	October 21, 2006	Kitt Peak	Spacewatch	·	460 m	MPC · JPL
626026	2006 UC_{337}	—	October 27, 2006	Mount Lemmon	Mount Lemmon Survey	AGN	890 m	MPC · JPL
626027	2006 UP_{338}	—	October 31, 2006	Mount Lemmon	Mount Lemmon Survey	·	1.3 km	MPC · JPL
626028	2006 UY_{340}	—	October 26, 2006	Mauna Kea	P. A. Wiegert	·	1.2 km	MPC · JPL
626029	2006 UQ_{347}	—	November 13, 2006	Mount Lemmon	Mount Lemmon Survey	·	650 m	MPC · JPL
626030	2006 UN_{350}	—	October 26, 2006	Mauna Kea	P. A. Wiegert	NYS	860 m	MPC · JPL
626031	2006 US_{357}	—	October 21, 2006	Kitt Peak	Spacewatch	NYS	570 m	MPC · JPL
626032	2006 UL_{358}	—	October 16, 2006	Kitt Peak	Spacewatch	·	500 m	MPC · JPL
626033	2006 UB_{360}	—	October 23, 2006	Kitt Peak	Spacewatch	MRX	810 m	MPC · JPL
626034	2006 UM_{360}	—	October 28, 2006	Kitt Peak	Spacewatch	·	1.4 km	MPC · JPL
626035	2006 UF_{361}	—	October 19, 2006	Catalina	CSS	·	1.3 km	MPC · JPL
626036	2006 UM_{362}	—	October 22, 2006	Catalina	CSS	·	1.2 km	MPC · JPL
626037	2006 UB_{363}	—	October 28, 2006	Catalina	CSS	·	1.7 km	MPC · JPL
626038	2006 US_{363}	—	October 19, 2006	Mount Lemmon	Mount Lemmon Survey	·	1.2 km	MPC · JPL
626039	2006 UC_{364}	—	October 20, 2006	Mount Lemmon	Mount Lemmon Survey	·	520 m	MPC · JPL
626040	2006 UE_{364}	—	October 21, 2006	Mount Lemmon	Mount Lemmon Survey	H	440 m	MPC · JPL
626041	2006 UM_{365}	—	October 27, 2006	Catalina	CSS	H	470 m	MPC · JPL
626042	2006 UP_{366}	—	August 1, 2016	Haleakala	Pan-STARRS 1	PHO	730 m	MPC · JPL
626043	2006 UA_{367}	—	October 21, 2006	Kitt Peak	Spacewatch	·	670 m	MPC · JPL
626044	2006 UA_{370}	—	November 24, 2000	Kitt Peak	Deep Lens Survey	·	2.5 km	MPC · JPL
626045	2006 UH_{370}	—	October 22, 2006	Kitt Peak	Spacewatch	·	560 m	MPC · JPL
626046	2006 UW_{370}	—	April 16, 2013	Cerro Tololo-DECam	DECam	·	1.1 km	MPC · JPL
626047	2006 UK_{371}	—	October 23, 2006	Mount Lemmon	Mount Lemmon Survey	·	690 m	MPC · JPL
626048	2006 UX_{372}	—	March 19, 2013	Haleakala	Pan-STARRS 1	·	1.6 km	MPC · JPL
626049	2006 UF_{374}	—	June 24, 2014	Haleakala	Pan-STARRS 1	·	1.4 km	MPC · JPL
626050	2006 UR_{374}	—	March 15, 2008	Mount Lemmon	Mount Lemmon Survey	·	500 m	MPC · JPL
626051	2006 UO_{377}	—	January 11, 2008	Kitt Peak	Spacewatch	KOR	970 m	MPC · JPL
626052	2006 UP_{378}	—	June 29, 2015	Haleakala	Pan-STARRS 1	GEF	870 m	MPC · JPL
626053	2006 UD_{379}	—	October 21, 2006	Kitt Peak	Spacewatch	·	540 m	MPC · JPL
626054	2006 UZ_{379}	—	October 31, 2006	Mount Lemmon	Mount Lemmon Survey	MAS	500 m	MPC · JPL
626055	2006 US_{380}	—	October 20, 2006	Kitt Peak	Deep Ecliptic Survey	MAS	550 m	MPC · JPL
626056	2006 UD_{381}	—	September 5, 2013	Kitt Peak	Spacewatch	·	540 m	MPC · JPL
626057	2006 UP_{382}	—	October 16, 2006	Kitt Peak	Spacewatch	·	1.1 km	MPC · JPL
626058	2006 UO_{387}	—	October 19, 2006	Kitt Peak	Spacewatch	·	440 m	MPC · JPL
626059	2006 VT_{3}	—	September 30, 2006	Mount Lemmon	Mount Lemmon Survey	·	620 m	MPC · JPL
626060	2006 VG_{5}	—	September 28, 2006	Mount Lemmon	Mount Lemmon Survey	·	1.6 km	MPC · JPL
626061	2006 VR_{10}	—	October 31, 2006	Mount Lemmon	Mount Lemmon Survey	·	1.8 km	MPC · JPL
626062	2006 VM_{14}	—	October 2, 2006	Mount Lemmon	Mount Lemmon Survey	·	610 m	MPC · JPL
626063	2006 VC_{19}	—	October 21, 2006	Kitt Peak	Spacewatch	·	490 m	MPC · JPL
626064	2006 VL_{25}	—	September 30, 2006	Mount Lemmon	Mount Lemmon Survey	·	680 m	MPC · JPL
626065	2006 VM_{27}	—	September 27, 2006	Mount Lemmon	Mount Lemmon Survey	·	460 m	MPC · JPL
626066	2006 VS_{32}	—	November 11, 2006	Kitt Peak	Spacewatch	·	640 m	MPC · JPL
626067	2006 VN_{35}	—	October 27, 2006	Mount Lemmon	Mount Lemmon Survey	·	1.2 km	MPC · JPL
626068	2006 VW_{40}	—	October 2, 2006	Mount Lemmon	Mount Lemmon Survey	·	510 m	MPC · JPL
626069	2006 VQ_{47}	—	November 1, 2006	Mount Lemmon	Mount Lemmon Survey	·	1.1 km	MPC · JPL
626070	2006 VT_{52}	—	October 22, 2006	Palomar	NEAT	·	1.3 km	MPC · JPL
626071	2006 VH_{56}	—	November 11, 2006	Kitt Peak	Spacewatch	MIS	1.5 km	MPC · JPL
626072	2006 VS_{59}	—	October 23, 2006	Mount Lemmon	Mount Lemmon Survey	·	1.8 km	MPC · JPL
626073	2006 VL_{60}	—	October 23, 2006	Mount Lemmon	Mount Lemmon Survey	·	1.0 km	MPC · JPL
626074	2006 VJ_{61}	—	October 20, 2006	Mount Lemmon	Mount Lemmon Survey	·	3.2 km	MPC · JPL
626075	2006 VG_{64}	—	November 11, 2006	Kitt Peak	Spacewatch	·	550 m	MPC · JPL
626076	2006 VG_{66}	—	October 28, 2006	Mount Lemmon	Mount Lemmon Survey	·	1.1 km	MPC · JPL
626077	2006 VW_{66}	—	September 25, 2006	Mount Lemmon	Mount Lemmon Survey	·	1.1 km	MPC · JPL
626078	2006 VT_{74}	—	November 11, 2006	Mount Lemmon	Mount Lemmon Survey	DOR	2.1 km	MPC · JPL
626079	2006 VA_{78}	—	November 12, 2006	Mount Lemmon	Mount Lemmon Survey	·	540 m	MPC · JPL
626080	2006 VX_{78}	—	October 4, 2006	Mount Lemmon	Mount Lemmon Survey	NYS	560 m	MPC · JPL
626081	2006 VR_{80}	—	November 12, 2006	Mount Lemmon	Mount Lemmon Survey	·	1.1 km	MPC · JPL
626082	2006 VU_{82}	—	September 25, 2006	Mount Lemmon	Mount Lemmon Survey	·	550 m	MPC · JPL
626083	2006 VV_{82}	—	November 13, 2006	Kitt Peak	Spacewatch	·	1.3 km	MPC · JPL
626084	2006 VA_{91}	—	October 4, 2006	Mount Lemmon	Mount Lemmon Survey	·	1.2 km	MPC · JPL
626085	2006 VR_{94}	—	November 15, 2006	Kitt Peak	Spacewatch	·	600 m	MPC · JPL
626086	2006 VY_{101}	—	September 25, 2006	Mount Lemmon	Mount Lemmon Survey	·	480 m	MPC · JPL
626087	2006 VZ_{103}	—	October 21, 2006	Palomar	NEAT	·	1.6 km	MPC · JPL
626088	2006 VH_{114}	—	October 17, 2006	Kitt Peak	Spacewatch	·	610 m	MPC · JPL
626089	2006 VE_{118}	—	November 14, 2006	Kitt Peak	Spacewatch	·	1.2 km	MPC · JPL
626090	2006 VZ_{119}	—	October 13, 2006	Kitt Peak	Spacewatch	NYS	570 m	MPC · JPL
626091	2006 VE_{130}	—	October 31, 2006	Mount Lemmon	Mount Lemmon Survey	·	1.5 km	MPC · JPL
626092	2006 VF_{133}	—	October 3, 2006	Mount Lemmon	Mount Lemmon Survey	·	550 m	MPC · JPL
626093	2006 VQ_{136}	—	November 15, 2006	Kitt Peak	Spacewatch	·	590 m	MPC · JPL
626094	2006 VF_{138}	—	September 28, 2006	Mount Lemmon	Mount Lemmon Survey	AST	1.4 km	MPC · JPL
626095	2006 VX_{148}	—	September 30, 2006	Mount Lemmon	Mount Lemmon Survey	·	1.3 km	MPC · JPL
626096	2006 VT_{149}	—	November 13, 2006	Catalina	CSS	·	1.4 km	MPC · JPL
626097	2006 VF_{154}	—	October 4, 2006	Mount Lemmon	Mount Lemmon Survey	·	570 m	MPC · JPL
626098	2006 VP_{170}	—	November 13, 2006	Kitt Peak	Spacewatch	·	1.8 km	MPC · JPL
626099	2006 VS_{171}	—	November 2, 2006	Mount Lemmon	Mount Lemmon Survey	(32418)	1.3 km	MPC · JPL
626100	2006 VT_{171}	—	November 2, 2006	Mount Lemmon	Mount Lemmon Survey	·	1.5 km	MPC · JPL

== 626101–626200 ==
back to top

Designation			Discovery			Properties		Ref
Permanent	Provisional	Named after	Date	Site	Discoverer(s)	Category	Diam.	Ref
626101	2006 VF_{173}	—	November 11, 2006	Kitt Peak	Spacewatch	·	360 m	MPC · JPL
626102	2006 VU_{175}	—	November 13, 2006	Mount Lemmon	Mount Lemmon Survey	·	530 m	MPC · JPL
626103	2006 VV_{175}	—	October 17, 2006	Catalina	CSS	·	710 m	MPC · JPL
626104	2006 VC_{179}	—	July 25, 2014	Haleakala	Pan-STARRS 1	·	1.3 km	MPC · JPL
626105	2006 VL_{179}	—	October 19, 2006	Mount Lemmon	Mount Lemmon Survey	·	1.6 km	MPC · JPL
626106	2006 VV_{179}	—	November 11, 2006	Mount Lemmon	Mount Lemmon Survey	·	2.6 km	MPC · JPL
626107	2006 VM_{182}	—	November 1, 2006	Mount Lemmon	Mount Lemmon Survey	·	1.0 km	MPC · JPL
626108	2006 WD_{8}	—	November 16, 2006	Mount Lemmon	Mount Lemmon Survey	·	1.2 km	MPC · JPL
626109	2006 WA_{9}	—	November 16, 2006	Kitt Peak	Spacewatch	·	590 m	MPC · JPL
626110	2006 WN_{9}	—	November 2, 2006	Mount Lemmon	Mount Lemmon Survey	·	1.5 km	MPC · JPL
626111	2006 WB_{10}	—	October 23, 2006	Mount Lemmon	Mount Lemmon Survey	·	1.1 km	MPC · JPL
626112	2006 WF_{21}	—	November 17, 2006	Mount Lemmon	Mount Lemmon Survey	(5)	880 m	MPC · JPL
626113	2006 WT_{21}	—	November 17, 2006	Mount Lemmon	Mount Lemmon Survey	·	1.4 km	MPC · JPL
626114	2006 WG_{23}	—	November 17, 2006	Mount Lemmon	Mount Lemmon Survey	·	1.6 km	MPC · JPL
626115	2006 WA_{35}	—	October 22, 2006	Mount Lemmon	Mount Lemmon Survey	·	1.3 km	MPC · JPL
626116	2006 WS_{38}	—	November 16, 2006	Kitt Peak	Spacewatch	MAS	530 m	MPC · JPL
626117	2006 WU_{38}	—	October 23, 2006	Mount Lemmon	Mount Lemmon Survey	·	700 m	MPC · JPL
626118	2006 WD_{41}	—	November 16, 2006	Kitt Peak	Spacewatch	·	1 km	MPC · JPL
626119	2006 WF_{44}	—	October 3, 2006	Mount Lemmon	Mount Lemmon Survey	·	1.0 km	MPC · JPL
626120	2006 WS_{44}	—	November 16, 2006	Kitt Peak	Spacewatch	·	1.5 km	MPC · JPL
626121	2006 WT_{44}	—	November 16, 2006	Kitt Peak	Spacewatch	·	1.3 km	MPC · JPL
626122	2006 WD_{45}	—	October 31, 2006	Mount Lemmon	Mount Lemmon Survey	·	500 m	MPC · JPL
626123	2006 WY_{53}	—	November 16, 2006	Kitt Peak	Spacewatch	·	720 m	MPC · JPL
626124	2006 WU_{57}	—	November 17, 2006	Kitt Peak	Spacewatch	·	540 m	MPC · JPL
626125	2006 WQ_{72}	—	November 18, 2006	Kitt Peak	Spacewatch	·	1.2 km	MPC · JPL
626126	2006 WH_{74}	—	October 31, 2006	Mount Lemmon	Mount Lemmon Survey	·	510 m	MPC · JPL
626127	2006 WE_{75}	—	October 19, 2006	Mount Lemmon	Mount Lemmon Survey	·	660 m	MPC · JPL
626128	2006 WX_{76}	—	November 18, 2006	Kitt Peak	Spacewatch	·	620 m	MPC · JPL
626129	2006 WO_{78}	—	November 18, 2006	Kitt Peak	Spacewatch	·	1.2 km	MPC · JPL
626130	2006 WW_{82}	—	October 21, 2006	Lulin	LUSS	·	1.4 km	MPC · JPL
626131	2006 WN_{91}	—	November 19, 2006	Kitt Peak	Spacewatch	BAP	750 m	MPC · JPL
626132	2006 WQ_{95}	—	November 11, 2006	Kitt Peak	Spacewatch	·	610 m	MPC · JPL
626133	2006 WF_{109}	—	November 19, 2006	Kitt Peak	Spacewatch	·	770 m	MPC · JPL
626134	2006 WW_{115}	—	November 20, 2006	Mount Lemmon	Mount Lemmon Survey	·	600 m	MPC · JPL
626135	2006 WH_{117}	—	November 20, 2006	Mount Lemmon	Mount Lemmon Survey	·	630 m	MPC · JPL
626136	2006 WJ_{119}	—	November 12, 2006	Mount Lemmon	Mount Lemmon Survey	·	1.5 km	MPC · JPL
626137	2006 WG_{120}	—	October 3, 2006	Mount Lemmon	Mount Lemmon Survey	·	650 m	MPC · JPL
626138	2006 WO_{122}	—	November 21, 2006	Mount Lemmon	Mount Lemmon Survey	·	620 m	MPC · JPL
626139	2006 WJ_{127}	—	November 23, 2006	Kitt Peak	Spacewatch	·	1.7 km	MPC · JPL
626140	2006 WY_{136}	—	October 11, 2006	Palomar	NEAT	·	1.2 km	MPC · JPL
626141	2006 WF_{140}	—	November 19, 2006	Kitt Peak	Spacewatch	·	1.2 km	MPC · JPL
626142	2006 WZ_{143}	—	November 20, 2006	Kitt Peak	Spacewatch	·	490 m	MPC · JPL
626143	2006 WG_{144}	—	November 20, 2006	Kitt Peak	Spacewatch	·	870 m	MPC · JPL
626144	2006 WD_{148}	—	November 10, 2006	Kitt Peak	Spacewatch	·	1.5 km	MPC · JPL
626145	2006 WR_{154}	—	November 22, 2006	Kitt Peak	Spacewatch	·	1.2 km	MPC · JPL
626146	2006 WV_{155}	—	November 22, 2006	Kitt Peak	Spacewatch	·	510 m	MPC · JPL
626147	2006 WF_{165}	—	November 11, 2006	Mount Lemmon	Mount Lemmon Survey	·	1.3 km	MPC · JPL
626148	2006 WZ_{166}	—	November 23, 2006	Kitt Peak	Spacewatch	·	950 m	MPC · JPL
626149	2006 WF_{168}	—	November 23, 2006	Kitt Peak	Spacewatch	GEF	990 m	MPC · JPL
626150	2006 WW_{168}	—	October 3, 2006	Mount Lemmon	Mount Lemmon Survey	·	1.6 km	MPC · JPL
626151	2006 WH_{179}	—	November 24, 2006	Mount Lemmon	Mount Lemmon Survey	·	480 m	MPC · JPL
626152	2006 WM_{180}	—	November 24, 2006	Mount Lemmon	Mount Lemmon Survey	·	1.2 km	MPC · JPL
626153	2006 WQ_{193}	—	November 27, 2006	Kitt Peak	Spacewatch	·	1.7 km	MPC · JPL
626154	2006 WN_{194}	—	November 19, 2006	Catalina	CSS	·	1.2 km	MPC · JPL
626155	2006 WP_{194}	—	November 28, 2006	Socorro	LINEAR	·	1.0 km	MPC · JPL
626156	2006 WE_{208}	—	November 19, 2006	Kitt Peak	Spacewatch	·	1.4 km	MPC · JPL
626157	2006 WR_{208}	—	November 17, 2006	Mount Lemmon	Mount Lemmon Survey	·	660 m	MPC · JPL
626158	2006 WY_{208}	—	November 19, 2006	Catalina	CSS	·	1.6 km	MPC · JPL
626159	2006 WN_{209}	—	November 27, 2006	Mount Lemmon	Mount Lemmon Survey	·	1.1 km	MPC · JPL
626160	2006 WF_{212}	—	December 29, 2011	Kitt Peak	Spacewatch	·	1.6 km	MPC · JPL
626161	2006 WP_{212}	—	November 25, 2006	Mount Lemmon	Mount Lemmon Survey	·	710 m	MPC · JPL
626162	2006 WB_{213}	—	October 20, 2017	Haleakala	Pan-STARRS 1	H	400 m	MPC · JPL
626163	2006 WW_{213}	—	September 17, 2013	Mount Lemmon	Mount Lemmon Survey	·	690 m	MPC · JPL
626164	2006 WG_{214}	—	January 20, 2015	Haleakala	Pan-STARRS 1	·	960 m	MPC · JPL
626165	2006 WA_{215}	—	November 20, 2006	Kitt Peak	Spacewatch	MAS	460 m	MPC · JPL
626166	2006 WB_{215}	—	September 4, 2014	Haleakala	Pan-STARRS 1	BAR	880 m	MPC · JPL
626167	2006 WQ_{215}	—	October 28, 2013	Mount Lemmon	Mount Lemmon Survey	·	680 m	MPC · JPL
626168	2006 WJ_{217}	—	November 17, 2006	Mount Lemmon	Mount Lemmon Survey	·	1.6 km	MPC · JPL
626169	2006 WP_{217}	—	December 31, 2007	Mount Lemmon	Mount Lemmon Survey	·	2.1 km	MPC · JPL
626170	2006 WV_{217}	—	November 12, 2006	Mount Lemmon	Mount Lemmon Survey	·	1.1 km	MPC · JPL
626171	2006 WX_{217}	—	October 13, 2006	Kitt Peak	Spacewatch	·	1.6 km	MPC · JPL
626172	2006 WJ_{219}	—	November 22, 2006	Kitt Peak	Spacewatch	HNS	980 m	MPC · JPL
626173	2006 WC_{222}	—	September 27, 2006	Mount Lemmon	Mount Lemmon Survey	NYS	660 m	MPC · JPL
626174	2006 WG_{223}	—	May 8, 2013	Haleakala	Pan-STARRS 1	·	1.3 km	MPC · JPL
626175	2006 WL_{223}	—	September 4, 2010	Mount Lemmon	Mount Lemmon Survey	·	1.3 km	MPC · JPL
626176	2006 WX_{223}	—	July 25, 2014	Haleakala	Pan-STARRS 1	·	1.3 km	MPC · JPL
626177	2006 WW_{224}	—	November 23, 2006	Kitt Peak	Spacewatch	·	2.1 km	MPC · JPL
626178	2006 WK_{225}	—	July 24, 2015	Haleakala	Pan-STARRS 1	KOR	1.1 km	MPC · JPL
626179	2006 WX_{225}	—	August 28, 2014	Haleakala	Pan-STARRS 1	·	1.2 km	MPC · JPL
626180	2006 WW_{227}	—	February 26, 2008	Mount Lemmon	Mount Lemmon Survey	·	1.1 km	MPC · JPL
626181	2006 WZ_{229}	—	November 27, 2006	Mount Lemmon	Mount Lemmon Survey	·	2.1 km	MPC · JPL
626182	2006 WT_{232}	—	November 24, 2006	Kitt Peak	Spacewatch	NYS	460 m	MPC · JPL
626183	2006 XS_{1}	—	October 31, 2006	Mount Lemmon	Mount Lemmon Survey	·	1.1 km	MPC · JPL
626184	2006 XX_{6}	—	October 14, 2001	Apache Point	SDSS Collaboration	·	1.7 km	MPC · JPL
626185	2006 XH_{15}	—	November 17, 2006	Kitt Peak	Spacewatch	·	1.4 km	MPC · JPL
626186	2006 XN_{32}	—	December 9, 2006	Kitt Peak	Spacewatch	NYS	640 m	MPC · JPL
626187	2006 XP_{36}	—	December 11, 2006	Kitt Peak	Spacewatch	NYS	640 m	MPC · JPL
626188	2006 XK_{49}	—	November 27, 2006	Mount Lemmon	Mount Lemmon Survey	·	890 m	MPC · JPL
626189	2006 XR_{61}	—	December 15, 2006	Kitt Peak	Spacewatch	MAS	430 m	MPC · JPL
626190	2006 XO_{63}	—	November 22, 2006	Catalina	CSS	·	1.4 km	MPC · JPL
626191	2006 XY_{76}	—	February 3, 2017	Haleakala	Pan-STARRS 1	·	1.7 km	MPC · JPL
626192	2006 XF_{77}	—	December 11, 2006	Kitt Peak	Spacewatch	·	1.9 km	MPC · JPL
626193	2006 XP_{79}	—	June 10, 2012	Mount Lemmon	Mount Lemmon Survey	·	990 m	MPC · JPL
626194	2006 XS_{82}	—	December 13, 2006	Mount Lemmon	Mount Lemmon Survey	·	2.0 km	MPC · JPL
626195	2006 YF_{1}	—	December 10, 2006	Kitt Peak	Spacewatch	·	830 m	MPC · JPL
626196	2006 YF_{19}	—	December 24, 2006	Kitt Peak	Spacewatch	·	1.4 km	MPC · JPL
626197	2006 YY_{22}	—	December 13, 2006	Kitt Peak	Spacewatch	·	480 m	MPC · JPL
626198	2006 YK_{24}	—	December 13, 2006	Kitt Peak	Spacewatch	·	640 m	MPC · JPL
626199	2006 YP_{27}	—	October 29, 2006	Mount Lemmon	Mount Lemmon Survey	·	1.2 km	MPC · JPL
626200	2006 YZ_{41}	—	December 22, 2006	Kitt Peak	Spacewatch	·	670 m	MPC · JPL

== 626201–626300 ==
back to top

Designation			Discovery			Properties		Ref
Permanent	Provisional	Named after	Date	Site	Discoverer(s)	Category	Diam.	Ref
626201	2006 YV_{44}	—	December 25, 2006	Piszkéstető	K. Sárneczky	DOR	1.6 km	MPC · JPL
626202	2006 YK_{53}	—	December 24, 2006	Kitt Peak	Spacewatch	·	2.7 km	MPC · JPL
626203	2006 YQ_{58}	—	October 13, 2013	Kitt Peak	Spacewatch	·	700 m	MPC · JPL
626204	2006 YL_{59}	—	December 23, 2006	Mount Lemmon	Mount Lemmon Survey	·	730 m	MPC · JPL
626205	2006 YD_{60}	—	December 11, 2013	Mount Lemmon	Mount Lemmon Survey	·	1.1 km	MPC · JPL
626206	2006 YV_{61}	—	October 12, 2010	Mount Lemmon	Mount Lemmon Survey	·	1.5 km	MPC · JPL
626207	2006 YY_{61}	—	September 30, 2010	Mount Lemmon	Mount Lemmon Survey	·	1.7 km	MPC · JPL
626208	2006 YD_{62}	—	December 21, 2006	Kitt Peak	L. H. Wasserman, M. W. Buie	·	570 m	MPC · JPL
626209	2006 YJ_{64}	—	November 26, 2013	Mount Lemmon	Mount Lemmon Survey	·	670 m	MPC · JPL
626210	2006 YQ_{64}	—	December 24, 2006	Kitt Peak	Spacewatch	·	740 m	MPC · JPL
626211	2006 YP_{65}	—	November 11, 2013	Mount Lemmon	Mount Lemmon Survey	·	710 m	MPC · JPL
626212	2006 YJ_{66}	—	December 26, 2006	Kitt Peak	Spacewatch	·	1.4 km	MPC · JPL
626213	2006 YQ_{66}	—	October 11, 2010	Mount Lemmon	Mount Lemmon Survey	·	1.3 km	MPC · JPL
626214	2006 YO_{68}	—	December 21, 2006	Kitt Peak	Spacewatch	·	720 m	MPC · JPL
626215	2007 AS_{1}	—	January 8, 2007	Mount Lemmon	Mount Lemmon Survey	·	2.1 km	MPC · JPL
626216	2007 AJ_{12}	—	January 13, 2007	Gaisberg	Gierlinger, R.	·	1.2 km	MPC · JPL
626217	2007 AA_{14}	—	December 17, 2006	Mount Lemmon	Mount Lemmon Survey	·	1.7 km	MPC · JPL
626218	2007 AK_{20}	—	January 10, 2007	Kitt Peak	Spacewatch	·	1.9 km	MPC · JPL
626219	2007 AO_{29}	—	January 9, 2007	Mount Lemmon	Mount Lemmon Survey	·	580 m	MPC · JPL
626220	2007 AL_{32}	—	February 13, 2008	Mount Lemmon	Mount Lemmon Survey	·	820 m	MPC · JPL
626221	2007 AO_{32}	—	January 1, 2014	Haleakala	Pan-STARRS 1	·	850 m	MPC · JPL
626222	2007 AY_{34}	—	January 10, 2007	Mount Lemmon	Mount Lemmon Survey	·	830 m	MPC · JPL
626223	2007 AJ_{35}	—	August 21, 2015	Haleakala	Pan-STARRS 1	KOR	1.0 km	MPC · JPL
626224	2007 AH_{37}	—	January 10, 2007	Mount Lemmon	Mount Lemmon Survey	·	820 m	MPC · JPL
626225	2007 BJ_{1}	—	January 9, 2007	Kitt Peak	Spacewatch	·	680 m	MPC · JPL
626226	2007 BW_{13}	—	January 17, 2007	Kitt Peak	Spacewatch	·	780 m	MPC · JPL
626227	2007 BP_{19}	—	January 21, 2007	Altschwendt	W. Ries	·	660 m	MPC · JPL
626228	2007 BN_{23}	—	December 26, 2006	Kitt Peak	Spacewatch	·	1.3 km	MPC · JPL
626229	2007 BZ_{23}	—	January 17, 2007	Kitt Peak	Spacewatch	critical	940 m	MPC · JPL
626230	2007 BS_{32}	—	January 24, 2007	Mount Lemmon	Mount Lemmon Survey	·	480 m	MPC · JPL
626231	2007 BU_{53}	—	December 27, 2006	Mount Lemmon	Mount Lemmon Survey	·	480 m	MPC · JPL
626232	2007 BR_{57}	—	January 24, 2007	Catalina	CSS	JUN	820 m	MPC · JPL
626233	2007 BC_{64}	—	January 27, 2007	Mount Lemmon	Mount Lemmon Survey	V	470 m	MPC · JPL
626234	2007 BQ_{70}	—	January 28, 2007	Kitt Peak	Spacewatch	HOF	2.2 km	MPC · JPL
626235	2007 BM_{79}	—	January 27, 2007	Kitt Peak	Spacewatch	·	1.1 km	MPC · JPL
626236	2007 BX_{81}	—	December 21, 2006	Kitt Peak	L. H. Wasserman, M. W. Buie	·	1.3 km	MPC · JPL
626237	2007 BH_{82}	—	January 24, 2007	Mount Lemmon	Mount Lemmon Survey	AEO	1.2 km	MPC · JPL
626238	2007 BD_{89}	—	January 19, 2007	Mauna Kea	P. A. Wiegert	·	780 m	MPC · JPL
626239	2007 BF_{93}	—	August 27, 2005	Anderson Mesa	LONEOS	·	1.7 km	MPC · JPL
626240	2007 BX_{97}	—	February 8, 2007	Mount Lemmon	Mount Lemmon Survey	AGN	980 m	MPC · JPL
626241	2007 BH_{104}	—	January 10, 2007	Kitt Peak	Spacewatch	·	760 m	MPC · JPL
626242	2007 BJ_{105}	—	January 17, 2007	Kitt Peak	Spacewatch	·	750 m	MPC · JPL
626243	2007 BU_{105}	—	January 17, 2007	Kitt Peak	Spacewatch	·	790 m	MPC · JPL
626244	2007 BU_{107}	—	September 4, 2014	Haleakala	Pan-STARRS 1	EUN	1.1 km	MPC · JPL
626245	2007 BK_{108}	—	December 2, 2010	Mount Lemmon	Mount Lemmon Survey	·	1.4 km	MPC · JPL
626246	2007 BG_{109}	—	April 30, 2008	Kitt Peak	Spacewatch	·	1.6 km	MPC · JPL
626247	2007 BP_{109}	—	January 28, 2007	Kitt Peak	Spacewatch	·	1.9 km	MPC · JPL
626248	2007 BQ_{109}	—	October 11, 2010	Mount Lemmon	Mount Lemmon Survey	·	1.4 km	MPC · JPL
626249	2007 BP_{111}	—	November 11, 2010	Kitt Peak	Spacewatch	·	1.6 km	MPC · JPL
626250	2007 BS_{111}	—	January 24, 2007	Mount Lemmon	Mount Lemmon Survey	·	560 m	MPC · JPL
626251	2007 BW_{111}	—	May 8, 2008	Kitt Peak	Spacewatch	HYG	2.3 km	MPC · JPL
626252	2007 BU_{112}	—	November 2, 2010	Mount Lemmon	Mount Lemmon Survey	·	1.4 km	MPC · JPL
626253	2007 BN_{113}	—	January 19, 2012	Haleakala	Pan-STARRS 1	HOF	2.1 km	MPC · JPL
626254	2007 BR_{115}	—	January 28, 2007	Mount Lemmon	Mount Lemmon Survey	·	2.1 km	MPC · JPL
626255	2007 CH_{11}	—	January 10, 2007	Mount Lemmon	Mount Lemmon Survey	DOR	2.2 km	MPC · JPL
626256	2007 CK_{12}	—	February 6, 2007	Mount Lemmon	Mount Lemmon Survey	·	1.3 km	MPC · JPL
626257	2007 CF_{14}	—	February 7, 2007	Kitt Peak	Spacewatch	·	1.2 km	MPC · JPL
626258	2007 CS_{19}	—	January 27, 2007	Kitt Peak	Spacewatch	·	780 m	MPC · JPL
626259	2007 CZ_{21}	—	January 28, 2007	Kitt Peak	Spacewatch	·	910 m	MPC · JPL
626260	2007 CZ_{27}	—	January 28, 2007	Mount Lemmon	Mount Lemmon Survey	·	2.1 km	MPC · JPL
626261	2007 CN_{28}	—	January 27, 2007	Mount Lemmon	Mount Lemmon Survey	·	830 m	MPC · JPL
626262	2007 CF_{33}	—	February 6, 2007	Mount Lemmon	Mount Lemmon Survey	·	1.6 km	MPC · JPL
626263	2007 CJ_{35}	—	January 26, 2007	Kitt Peak	Spacewatch	·	1.5 km	MPC · JPL
626264	2007 CG_{38}	—	January 27, 2007	Mount Lemmon	Mount Lemmon Survey	·	760 m	MPC · JPL
626265	2007 CJ_{54}	—	February 15, 2007	Marly	P. Kocher	·	1.1 km	MPC · JPL
626266	2007 CT_{54}	—	February 18, 2007	Charleston	R. Holmes	·	1.1 km	MPC · JPL
626267	2007 CL_{67}	—	August 5, 2005	Palomar	NEAT	NYS	790 m	MPC · JPL
626268	2007 CF_{75}	—	February 14, 2007	Mauna Kea	P. A. Wiegert	·	780 m	MPC · JPL
626269	2007 CT_{80}	—	February 13, 2007	Mount Lemmon	Mount Lemmon Survey	·	2.3 km	MPC · JPL
626270	2007 CU_{80}	—	February 13, 2007	Mount Lemmon	Mount Lemmon Survey	V	490 m	MPC · JPL
626271	2007 CQ_{81}	—	February 10, 2007	Mount Lemmon	Mount Lemmon Survey	·	2.0 km	MPC · JPL
626272	2007 CZ_{81}	—	February 13, 2007	Mount Lemmon	Mount Lemmon Survey	·	720 m	MPC · JPL
626273	2007 CC_{82}	—	March 28, 2015	Haleakala	Pan-STARRS 1	·	3.9 km	MPC · JPL
626274	2007 CY_{83}	—	January 27, 2007	Mount Lemmon	Mount Lemmon Survey	·	770 m	MPC · JPL
626275	2007 CM_{84}	—	February 8, 2007	Mount Lemmon	Mount Lemmon Survey	·	2.3 km	MPC · JPL
626276	2007 CA_{85}	—	February 10, 2007	Mount Lemmon	Mount Lemmon Survey	·	770 m	MPC · JPL
626277	2007 DE_{1}	—	January 28, 2007	Kitt Peak	Spacewatch	·	660 m	MPC · JPL
626278	2007 DF_{13}	—	February 17, 2007	Catalina	CSS	·	1.1 km	MPC · JPL
626279	2007 DR_{13}	—	February 17, 2007	Kitt Peak	Spacewatch	·	570 m	MPC · JPL
626280	2007 DM_{15}	—	February 17, 2007	Kitt Peak	Spacewatch	HOF	2.2 km	MPC · JPL
626281	2007 DA_{19}	—	January 27, 2007	Mount Lemmon	Mount Lemmon Survey	·	650 m	MPC · JPL
626282	2007 DD_{23}	—	February 17, 2007	Kitt Peak	Spacewatch	·	1.6 km	MPC · JPL
626283	2007 DE_{25}	—	February 17, 2007	Kitt Peak	Spacewatch	MAS	490 m	MPC · JPL
626284	2007 DZ_{32}	—	February 17, 2007	Kitt Peak	Spacewatch	·	1.4 km	MPC · JPL
626285	2007 DB_{46}	—	December 27, 2006	Mount Lemmon	Mount Lemmon Survey	·	600 m	MPC · JPL
626286	2007 DH_{54}	—	September 18, 1995	Kitt Peak	Spacewatch	·	1.6 km	MPC · JPL
626287	2007 DN_{56}	—	October 28, 2005	Kitt Peak	Spacewatch	·	1.4 km	MPC · JPL
626288	2007 DF_{63}	—	February 21, 2007	Kitt Peak	Spacewatch	MAS	490 m	MPC · JPL
626289	2007 DR_{65}	—	February 21, 2007	Kitt Peak	Spacewatch	·	1.5 km	MPC · JPL
626290	2007 DK_{70}	—	February 21, 2007	Kitt Peak	Spacewatch	NYS	610 m	MPC · JPL
626291	2007 DL_{72}	—	February 21, 2007	Kitt Peak	Spacewatch	·	820 m	MPC · JPL
626292	2007 DE_{74}	—	February 21, 2007	Kitt Peak	Spacewatch	V	460 m	MPC · JPL
626293	2007 DK_{83}	—	January 27, 2007	Mount Lemmon	Mount Lemmon Survey	·	750 m	MPC · JPL
626294	2007 DU_{84}	—	March 9, 2003	Kitt Peak	Spacewatch	·	790 m	MPC · JPL
626295	2007 DA_{90}	—	February 23, 2007	Kitt Peak	Spacewatch	·	1.0 km	MPC · JPL
626296	2007 DT_{104}	—	February 25, 2007	Mount Lemmon	Mount Lemmon Survey	·	740 m	MPC · JPL
626297	2007 DB_{119}	—	February 17, 2007	Mount Lemmon	Mount Lemmon Survey	·	810 m	MPC · JPL
626298	2007 DN_{120}	—	February 8, 2007	Kitt Peak	Spacewatch	·	830 m	MPC · JPL
626299	2007 DO_{120}	—	February 25, 2007	Kitt Peak	Spacewatch	MAS	590 m	MPC · JPL
626300	2007 DX_{121}	—	February 23, 2007	Mount Lemmon	Mount Lemmon Survey	·	1.5 km	MPC · JPL

== 626301–626400 ==
back to top

Designation			Discovery			Properties		Ref
Permanent	Provisional	Named after	Date	Site	Discoverer(s)	Category	Diam.	Ref
626301	2007 DT_{126}	—	February 21, 2007	Mount Lemmon	Mount Lemmon Survey	MAS	520 m	MPC · JPL
626302	2007 DF_{127}	—	February 21, 2007	Mount Lemmon	Mount Lemmon Survey	AGN	1.0 km	MPC · JPL
626303	2007 DA_{128}	—	February 26, 2007	Mount Lemmon	Mount Lemmon Survey	·	1.3 km	MPC · JPL
626304	2007 EU_{12}	—	February 21, 2007	Mount Lemmon	Mount Lemmon Survey	·	890 m	MPC · JPL
626305	2007 ED_{15}	—	February 21, 2007	Mount Lemmon	Mount Lemmon Survey	·	470 m	MPC · JPL
626306	2007 EK_{17}	—	March 9, 2007	Mount Lemmon	Mount Lemmon Survey	·	1.2 km	MPC · JPL
626307	2007 EW_{18}	—	March 10, 2007	Kitt Peak	Spacewatch	·	720 m	MPC · JPL
626308	2007 EP_{26}	—	March 10, 2007	Mount Lemmon	Mount Lemmon Survey	·	1.6 km	MPC · JPL
626309	2007 EU_{29}	—	March 9, 2007	Kitt Peak	Spacewatch	·	1.4 km	MPC · JPL
626310	2007 EJ_{33}	—	March 10, 2007	Mount Lemmon	Mount Lemmon Survey	·	790 m	MPC · JPL
626311	2007 EY_{44}	—	February 22, 2007	Kitt Peak	Spacewatch	·	770 m	MPC · JPL
626312	2007 EQ_{48}	—	March 9, 2007	Kitt Peak	Spacewatch	V	610 m	MPC · JPL
626313	2007 EQ_{64}	—	March 10, 2007	Kitt Peak	Spacewatch	PHO	800 m	MPC · JPL
626314	2007 EV_{66}	—	March 10, 2007	Kitt Peak	Spacewatch	·	2.2 km	MPC · JPL
626315	2007 EV_{68}	—	March 10, 2007	Kitt Peak	Spacewatch	EUN	1.0 km	MPC · JPL
626316	2007 EE_{85}	—	January 28, 2007	Mount Lemmon	Mount Lemmon Survey	·	1.2 km	MPC · JPL
626317	2007 EZ_{88}	—	February 23, 2007	Mount Lemmon	Mount Lemmon Survey	·	620 m	MPC · JPL
626318	2007 ER_{90}	—	March 9, 2007	Mount Lemmon	Mount Lemmon Survey	NYS	660 m	MPC · JPL
626319	2007 EK_{95}	—	March 10, 2007	Mount Lemmon	Mount Lemmon Survey	·	900 m	MPC · JPL
626320	2007 EX_{97}	—	January 17, 2007	Kitt Peak	Spacewatch	(1547)	1.4 km	MPC · JPL
626321	2007 ES_{107}	—	November 1, 2005	Kitt Peak	Spacewatch	V	640 m	MPC · JPL
626322	2007 EY_{109}	—	March 11, 2007	Kitt Peak	Spacewatch	·	930 m	MPC · JPL
626323	2007 EU_{118}	—	March 13, 2007	Mount Lemmon	Mount Lemmon Survey	·	1.2 km	MPC · JPL
626324	2007 EW_{147}	—	March 12, 2007	Mount Lemmon	Mount Lemmon Survey	·	1.5 km	MPC · JPL
626325	2007 EO_{165}	—	March 15, 2007	Kitt Peak	Spacewatch	·	1.1 km	MPC · JPL
626326	2007 EO_{174}	—	March 14, 2007	Kitt Peak	Spacewatch	·	970 m	MPC · JPL
626327	2007 EO_{186}	—	March 15, 2007	Mount Lemmon	Mount Lemmon Survey	·	780 m	MPC · JPL
626328	2007 EY_{231}	—	October 30, 2010	Mount Lemmon	Mount Lemmon Survey	·	940 m	MPC · JPL
626329	2007 EW_{233}	—	March 14, 2007	Mount Lemmon	Mount Lemmon Survey	·	990 m	MPC · JPL
626330	2007 EE_{234}	—	March 10, 2007	Mount Lemmon	Mount Lemmon Survey	·	770 m	MPC · JPL
626331	2007 EG_{234}	—	September 12, 2014	Haleakala	Pan-STARRS 1	·	1.5 km	MPC · JPL
626332	2007 EY_{234}	—	March 13, 2007	Kitt Peak	Spacewatch	MAS	550 m	MPC · JPL
626333	2007 EP_{235}	—	March 14, 2007	Mount Lemmon	Mount Lemmon Survey	·	1.6 km	MPC · JPL
626334	2007 EV_{236}	—	September 27, 2009	Mount Lemmon	Mount Lemmon Survey	·	1.6 km	MPC · JPL
626335	2007 EG_{241}	—	March 14, 2007	Kitt Peak	Spacewatch	·	840 m	MPC · JPL
626336	2007 FE_{24}	—	March 20, 2007	Kitt Peak	Spacewatch	MAS	530 m	MPC · JPL
626337	2007 FT_{25}	—	March 20, 2007	Kitt Peak	Spacewatch	·	2.0 km	MPC · JPL
626338	2007 FE_{38}	—	November 20, 2006	Mount Lemmon	Mount Lemmon Survey	·	2.0 km	MPC · JPL
626339	2007 FF_{53}	—	September 15, 2004	Anderson Mesa	LONEOS	·	1.1 km	MPC · JPL
626340	2007 FQ_{53}	—	March 16, 2007	Mount Lemmon	Mount Lemmon Survey	V	550 m	MPC · JPL
626341	2007 FT_{53}	—	March 16, 2007	Kitt Peak	Spacewatch	·	930 m	MPC · JPL
626342	2007 FS_{55}	—	March 16, 2007	Kitt Peak	Spacewatch	·	800 m	MPC · JPL
626343	2007 FG_{58}	—	February 22, 2014	Mount Lemmon	Mount Lemmon Survey	NYS	730 m	MPC · JPL
626344	2007 FM_{58}	—	July 29, 2008	Kitt Peak	Spacewatch	·	730 m	MPC · JPL
626345	2007 FW_{59}	—	March 26, 2007	Mount Lemmon	Mount Lemmon Survey	·	1.4 km	MPC · JPL
626346	2007 GA_{7}	—	April 7, 2007	Mount Lemmon	Mount Lemmon Survey	KOR	1.2 km	MPC · JPL
626347	2007 GE_{12}	—	April 11, 2007	Kitt Peak	Spacewatch	LIX	3.0 km	MPC · JPL
626348	2007 GR_{19}	—	April 11, 2007	Kitt Peak	Spacewatch	·	570 m	MPC · JPL
626349	2007 GH_{34}	—	March 15, 2007	Kitt Peak	Spacewatch	NYS	860 m	MPC · JPL
626350	2007 GS_{35}	—	April 14, 2007	Kitt Peak	Spacewatch	·	2.3 km	MPC · JPL
626351	2007 GE_{37}	—	April 14, 2007	Kitt Peak	Spacewatch	NYS	1.1 km	MPC · JPL
626352	2007 GK_{39}	—	April 14, 2007	Kitt Peak	Spacewatch	·	2.4 km	MPC · JPL
626353	2007 GA_{55}	—	April 15, 2007	Kitt Peak	Spacewatch	·	1.7 km	MPC · JPL
626354	2007 GW_{57}	—	April 25, 2003	Kitt Peak	Spacewatch	·	760 m	MPC · JPL
626355	2007 GE_{59}	—	October 27, 2005	Kitt Peak	Spacewatch	NYS	930 m	MPC · JPL
626356	2007 GC_{68}	—	April 9, 2003	Palomar	NEAT	·	1.1 km	MPC · JPL
626357	2007 GH_{69}	—	March 26, 2007	Kitt Peak	Spacewatch	·	950 m	MPC · JPL
626358	2007 GW_{77}	—	March 11, 2007	Kitt Peak	Spacewatch	T_{j} (2.95)	3.2 km	MPC · JPL
626359	2007 GR_{79}	—	February 26, 2014	Mount Lemmon	Mount Lemmon Survey	·	1 km	MPC · JPL
626360	2007 GN_{80}	—	April 1, 2008	Kitt Peak	Spacewatch	L5	7.9 km	MPC · JPL
626361	2007 GX_{80}	—	April 15, 2007	Kitt Peak	Spacewatch	·	720 m	MPC · JPL
626362	2007 HV_{22}	—	April 18, 2007	Kitt Peak	Spacewatch	·	590 m	MPC · JPL
626363	2007 HT_{25}	—	April 18, 2007	Mount Lemmon	Mount Lemmon Survey	·	970 m	MPC · JPL
626364	2007 HC_{33}	—	April 19, 2007	Mount Lemmon	Mount Lemmon Survey	·	1.0 km	MPC · JPL
626365	2007 HG_{36}	—	April 19, 2007	Kitt Peak	Spacewatch	·	600 m	MPC · JPL
626366	2007 HE_{38}	—	April 20, 2007	Kitt Peak	Spacewatch	·	1.1 km	MPC · JPL
626367	2007 HU_{65}	—	August 4, 2003	Kitt Peak	Spacewatch	·	1.8 km	MPC · JPL
626368	2007 HX_{67}	—	March 13, 2007	Mount Lemmon	Mount Lemmon Survey	·	1.1 km	MPC · JPL
626369	2007 HB_{69}	—	April 24, 2007	Kitt Peak	Spacewatch	·	580 m	MPC · JPL
626370	2007 HM_{70}	—	April 19, 2007	Mount Lemmon	Mount Lemmon Survey	·	2.7 km	MPC · JPL
626371	2007 HE_{71}	—	April 15, 2007	Catalina	CSS	·	1.1 km	MPC · JPL
626372	2007 HA_{89}	—	April 14, 2007	Kitt Peak	Spacewatch	NYS	780 m	MPC · JPL
626373	2007 HW_{92}	—	April 23, 2007	Mount Lemmon	Mount Lemmon Survey	·	1.0 km	MPC · JPL
626374	2007 HD_{94}	—	April 23, 2007	Mount Graham	Grazian, A., Gredel, R.	·	1.6 km	MPC · JPL
626375	2007 HK_{104}	—	April 24, 2007	Mount Lemmon	Mount Lemmon Survey	·	3.0 km	MPC · JPL
626376	2007 HJ_{105}	—	September 22, 2008	Kitt Peak	Spacewatch	·	890 m	MPC · JPL
626377	2007 HD_{114}	—	April 22, 2007	Kitt Peak	Spacewatch	·	1.5 km	MPC · JPL
626378	2007 JY_{3}	—	April 15, 2007	Kitt Peak	Spacewatch	BRA	1.7 km	MPC · JPL
626379	2007 JO_{10}	—	September 17, 2004	Kitt Peak	Spacewatch	·	1.1 km	MPC · JPL
626380	2007 JN_{17}	—	May 7, 2007	Kitt Peak	Spacewatch	·	790 m	MPC · JPL
626381	2007 JP_{47}	—	April 20, 2010	WISE	WISE	L5	9.1 km	MPC · JPL
626382	2007 JN_{48}	—	April 5, 2011	Kitt Peak	Spacewatch	·	960 m	MPC · JPL
626383	2007 JD_{50}	—	March 17, 2012	Mount Lemmon	Mount Lemmon Survey	LIX	2.9 km	MPC · JPL
626384	2007 KU_{4}	—	October 25, 2003	Kitt Peak	Spacewatch	URS	2.8 km	MPC · JPL
626385	2007 KB_{6}	—	May 10, 2007	Mount Lemmon	Mount Lemmon Survey	·	550 m	MPC · JPL
626386	2007 KD_{12}	—	May 25, 2007	Mount Lemmon	Mount Lemmon Survey	·	980 m	MPC · JPL
626387	2007 LM_{3}	—	June 8, 2007	Kitt Peak	Spacewatch	·	1.1 km	MPC · JPL
626388	2007 LV_{5}	—	May 11, 2007	Mount Lemmon	Mount Lemmon Survey	·	970 m	MPC · JPL
626389	2007 LX_{30}	—	June 11, 2007	Mauna Kea	D. D. Balam, K. M. Perrett	·	1.4 km	MPC · JPL
626390	2007 MM_{4}	—	April 23, 2007	Mount Lemmon	Mount Lemmon Survey	PHO	750 m	MPC · JPL
626391	2007 MB_{6}	—	June 17, 2007	Kitt Peak	Spacewatch	·	990 m	MPC · JPL
626392	2007 MN_{17}	—	June 21, 2007	Mount Lemmon	Mount Lemmon Survey	·	470 m	MPC · JPL
626393	2007 MQ_{18}	—	August 28, 2003	Palomar	NEAT	(5)	1.1 km	MPC · JPL
626394	2007 MP_{28}	—	October 21, 2014	Kitt Peak	Spacewatch	·	460 m	MPC · JPL
626395	2007 MM_{30}	—	June 18, 2007	Kitt Peak	Spacewatch	·	880 m	MPC · JPL
626396	2007 NY_{2}	—	July 14, 2007	Tiki	Teamo, N., S. F. Hönig	·	1.1 km	MPC · JPL
626397	2007 NO_{7}	—	July 10, 2007	Siding Spring	SSS	·	530 m	MPC · JPL
626398	2007 OV_{11}	—	October 20, 2017	Mount Lemmon	Mount Lemmon Survey	·	530 m	MPC · JPL
626399	2007 PT_{7}	—	July 23, 2007	Lulin	LUSS	·	1.4 km	MPC · JPL
626400	2007 PH_{17}	—	August 9, 2007	Socorro	LINEAR	MAS	810 m	MPC · JPL

== 626401–626500 ==
back to top

Designation			Discovery			Properties		Ref
Permanent	Provisional	Named after	Date	Site	Discoverer(s)	Category	Diam.	Ref
626401	2007 PR_{35}	—	August 10, 2007	Kitt Peak	Spacewatch	T_{j} (2.92)	2.5 km	MPC · JPL
626402	2007 PP_{45}	—	August 13, 2007	Siding Spring	SSS	·	1.3 km	MPC · JPL
626403	2007 PH_{46}	—	August 9, 2007	Kitt Peak	Spacewatch	·	1.1 km	MPC · JPL
626404	2007 PS_{51}	—	January 30, 2011	Kitt Peak	Spacewatch	T_{j} (2.99) · 3:2	3.4 km	MPC · JPL
626405	2007 PZ_{51}	—	August 10, 2007	Kitt Peak	Spacewatch	·	850 m	MPC · JPL
626406	2007 PH_{54}	—	October 1, 2003	Anderson Mesa	LONEOS	·	1.1 km	MPC · JPL
626407	2007 QM_{3}	—	August 22, 2007	Socorro	LINEAR	·	940 m	MPC · JPL
626408	2007 QT_{15}	—	September 3, 2007	Catalina	CSS	·	1.1 km	MPC · JPL
626409	2007 QQ_{19}	—	August 18, 2007	Anderson Mesa	LONEOS	·	1.1 km	MPC · JPL
626410	2007 RV_{4}	—	September 21, 2000	Kitt Peak	Spacewatch	·	960 m	MPC · JPL
626411	2007 RO_{22}	—	September 3, 2007	Catalina	CSS	LIX	2.9 km	MPC · JPL
626412	2007 RX_{24}	—	September 4, 2007	Mount Lemmon	Mount Lemmon Survey	·	2.4 km	MPC · JPL
626413	2007 RE_{39}	—	September 8, 2007	Mount Lemmon	Mount Lemmon Survey	·	2.2 km	MPC · JPL
626414	2007 RU_{46}	—	September 29, 2003	Kitt Peak	Spacewatch	·	710 m	MPC · JPL
626415	2007 RB_{47}	—	September 9, 2007	Mount Lemmon	Mount Lemmon Survey	·	990 m	MPC · JPL
626416	2007 RU_{54}	—	September 9, 2007	Kitt Peak	Spacewatch	·	1.0 km	MPC · JPL
626417	2007 RW_{56}	—	September 9, 2007	Kitt Peak	Spacewatch	·	1.2 km	MPC · JPL
626418	2007 RL_{64}	—	February 14, 2004	Kitt Peak	Spacewatch	·	2.6 km	MPC · JPL
626419	2007 RQ_{72}	—	August 10, 2007	Kitt Peak	Spacewatch	L4	6.6 km	MPC · JPL
626420	2007 RT_{72}	—	September 10, 2007	Mount Lemmon	Mount Lemmon Survey	·	1.9 km	MPC · JPL
626421	2007 RK_{76}	—	August 10, 2007	Kitt Peak	Spacewatch	·	2.1 km	MPC · JPL
626422	2007 RO_{90}	—	September 10, 2007	Mount Lemmon	Mount Lemmon Survey	·	540 m	MPC · JPL
626423	2007 RL_{98}	—	September 10, 2007	Kitt Peak	Spacewatch	·	870 m	MPC · JPL
626424	2007 RR_{103}	—	September 11, 2007	Catalina	CSS	·	1.0 km	MPC · JPL
626425	2007 RO_{106}	—	September 11, 2007	Mount Lemmon	Mount Lemmon Survey	H	470 m	MPC · JPL
626426	2007 RE_{109}	—	September 11, 2007	Kitt Peak	Spacewatch	·	2.9 km	MPC · JPL
626427	2007 RF_{111}	—	September 8, 2007	Anderson Mesa	LONEOS	·	630 m	MPC · JPL
626428	2007 RG_{116}	—	September 11, 2007	Kitt Peak	Spacewatch	·	470 m	MPC · JPL
626429	2007 RH_{121}	—	September 12, 2007	Mount Lemmon	Mount Lemmon Survey	ADE	1.1 km	MPC · JPL
626430	2007 RT_{129}	—	September 12, 2007	Mount Lemmon	Mount Lemmon Survey	(260)	2.8 km	MPC · JPL
626431	2007 RE_{131}	—	February 11, 2004	Kitt Peak	Spacewatch	·	1.7 km	MPC · JPL
626432	2007 RQ_{142}	—	September 13, 2007	Socorro	LINEAR	·	1.5 km	MPC · JPL
626433	2007 RV_{144}	—	September 5, 2007	Anderson Mesa	LONEOS	JUN	740 m	MPC · JPL
626434	2007 RK_{156}	—	August 10, 2007	Kitt Peak	Spacewatch	·	650 m	MPC · JPL
626435	2007 RA_{159}	—	August 24, 2007	Kitt Peak	Spacewatch	·	410 m	MPC · JPL
626436	2007 RR_{165}	—	August 10, 2007	Kitt Peak	Spacewatch	TIR	2.5 km	MPC · JPL
626437	2007 RR_{175}	—	September 13, 2007	Catalina	CSS	·	1.1 km	MPC · JPL
626438	2007 RG_{177}	—	September 10, 2007	Mount Lemmon	Mount Lemmon Survey	·	1.9 km	MPC · JPL
626439	2007 RQ_{187}	—	September 13, 2007	Mount Lemmon	Mount Lemmon Survey	·	1.1 km	MPC · JPL
626440	2007 RZ_{189}	—	September 10, 2007	Kitt Peak	Spacewatch	·	1.1 km	MPC · JPL
626441	2007 RU_{197}	—	September 13, 2007	Mount Lemmon	Mount Lemmon Survey	·	1.2 km	MPC · JPL
626442	2007 RM_{200}	—	September 13, 2007	Kitt Peak	Spacewatch	·	1.2 km	MPC · JPL
626443	2007 RG_{202}	—	September 13, 2007	Kitt Peak	Spacewatch	·	2.2 km	MPC · JPL
626444	2007 RN_{205}	—	September 9, 2007	Kitt Peak	Spacewatch	·	1.2 km	MPC · JPL
626445	2007 RB_{217}	—	September 13, 2007	Kitt Peak	Spacewatch	·	1.3 km	MPC · JPL
626446	2007 RU_{223}	—	September 8, 2007	Mount Lemmon	Mount Lemmon Survey	·	2.4 km	MPC · JPL
626447	2007 RW_{226}	—	September 10, 2007	Kitt Peak	Spacewatch	(12739)	1.2 km	MPC · JPL
626448	2007 RT_{227}	—	September 10, 2007	Mount Lemmon	Mount Lemmon Survey	·	840 m	MPC · JPL
626449	2007 RA_{235}	—	September 12, 2007	Mount Lemmon	Mount Lemmon Survey	MAS	450 m	MPC · JPL
626450	2007 RU_{241}	—	September 12, 2007	Mount Lemmon	Mount Lemmon Survey	·	540 m	MPC · JPL
626451	2007 RG_{249}	—	September 13, 2007	Mount Lemmon	Mount Lemmon Survey	·	2.4 km	MPC · JPL
626452	2007 RO_{256}	—	September 14, 2007	Kitt Peak	Spacewatch	EOS	2.2 km	MPC · JPL
626453	2007 RX_{257}	—	September 14, 2007	Catalina	CSS	(1547)	1.6 km	MPC · JPL
626454	2007 RX_{272}	—	September 15, 2007	Kitt Peak	Spacewatch	·	2.4 km	MPC · JPL
626455	2007 RJ_{281}	—	September 13, 2007	Catalina	CSS	·	1.6 km	MPC · JPL
626456	2007 RL_{286}	—	September 3, 2007	Catalina	CSS	·	590 m	MPC · JPL
626457	2007 RC_{287}	—	September 5, 2007	Mount Lemmon	Mount Lemmon Survey	·	510 m	MPC · JPL
626458	2007 RQ_{287}	—	September 9, 2007	Kitt Peak	Spacewatch	·	1.1 km	MPC · JPL
626459	2007 RR_{287}	—	September 10, 2007	Kitt Peak	Spacewatch	·	1.9 km	MPC · JPL
626460	2007 RV_{290}	—	September 13, 2007	Kitt Peak	Spacewatch	·	1.3 km	MPC · JPL
626461	2007 RY_{291}	—	September 12, 2007	Mount Lemmon	Mount Lemmon Survey	·	2.2 km	MPC · JPL
626462	2007 RD_{295}	—	September 14, 2007	Mount Lemmon	Mount Lemmon Survey	·	830 m	MPC · JPL
626463	2007 RZ_{295}	—	September 15, 2007	Kitt Peak	Spacewatch	·	1.8 km	MPC · JPL
626464	2007 RN_{297}	—	September 10, 2007	Kitt Peak	Spacewatch	HYG	2.1 km	MPC · JPL
626465	2007 RV_{311}	—	September 5, 2007	Catalina	CSS	·	2.4 km	MPC · JPL
626466	2007 RZ_{311}	—	September 9, 2007	Mauna Kea	D. D. Balam, K. M. Perrett	·	1.2 km	MPC · JPL
626467	2007 RM_{313}	—	September 8, 2007	Mount Lemmon	Mount Lemmon Survey	H	490 m	MPC · JPL
626468	2007 RS_{320}	—	September 14, 2007	Socorro	LINEAR	JUN	620 m	MPC · JPL
626469	2007 RR_{327}	—	September 10, 2007	Mount Lemmon	Mount Lemmon Survey	·	2.5 km	MPC · JPL
626470	2007 RZ_{327}	—	September 14, 2007	Mount Lemmon	Mount Lemmon Survey	·	1.1 km	MPC · JPL
626471	2007 RZ_{330}	—	September 12, 2007	Mount Lemmon	Mount Lemmon Survey	·	380 m	MPC · JPL
626472	2007 RW_{333}	—	September 11, 2007	Mount Lemmon	Mount Lemmon Survey	NYS	890 m	MPC · JPL
626473	2007 RE_{334}	—	September 15, 2007	Lulin	LUSS	·	410 m	MPC · JPL
626474	2007 RB_{336}	—	October 29, 2014	Haleakala	Pan-STARRS 1	·	2.5 km	MPC · JPL
626475	2007 RE_{337}	—	September 10, 2007	Kitt Peak	Spacewatch	·	1.3 km	MPC · JPL
626476	2007 RG_{339}	—	July 21, 2012	Siding Spring	SSS	THB	3.1 km	MPC · JPL
626477	2007 RN_{339}	—	September 13, 2007	Mount Lemmon	Mount Lemmon Survey	·	1.4 km	MPC · JPL
626478	2007 RO_{339}	—	April 4, 2017	Haleakala	Pan-STARRS 1	ELF	2.9 km	MPC · JPL
626479	2007 RZ_{345}	—	September 14, 2007	Catalina	CSS	H	370 m	MPC · JPL
626480	2007 RV_{346}	—	September 11, 2007	Mount Lemmon	Mount Lemmon Survey	·	3.4 km	MPC · JPL
626481	2007 RE_{347}	—	September 9, 2007	Kitt Peak	Spacewatch	·	1.4 km	MPC · JPL
626482	2007 RK_{347}	—	September 10, 2007	Mount Lemmon	Mount Lemmon Survey	·	840 m	MPC · JPL
626483	2007 RQ_{347}	—	May 23, 2014	Haleakala	Pan-STARRS 1	·	910 m	MPC · JPL
626484	2007 RV_{347}	—	January 10, 2013	Haleakala	Pan-STARRS 1	·	670 m	MPC · JPL
626485	2007 RY_{347}	—	October 20, 2016	Mount Lemmon	Mount Lemmon Survey	·	1.2 km	MPC · JPL
626486	2007 RH_{348}	—	July 23, 2015	Haleakala	Pan-STARRS 1	·	1.1 km	MPC · JPL
626487	2007 RT_{349}	—	October 13, 2013	Mount Lemmon	Mount Lemmon Survey	·	1.7 km	MPC · JPL
626488	2007 RQ_{350}	—	September 12, 2007	Kitt Peak	Spacewatch	·	470 m	MPC · JPL
626489	2007 RO_{352}	—	September 10, 2007	Kitt Peak	Spacewatch	·	1.2 km	MPC · JPL
626490	2007 RC_{353}	—	September 13, 2007	Mount Lemmon	Mount Lemmon Survey	·	1.9 km	MPC · JPL
626491	2007 RG_{353}	—	September 14, 2007	Mount Lemmon	Mount Lemmon Survey	·	2.2 km	MPC · JPL
626492	2007 RG_{355}	—	September 11, 2007	Mount Lemmon	Mount Lemmon Survey	EOS	1.8 km	MPC · JPL
626493	2007 RO_{355}	—	September 14, 2007	Mount Lemmon	Mount Lemmon Survey	LIX	2.4 km	MPC · JPL
626494	2007 RJ_{357}	—	September 10, 2007	Kitt Peak	Spacewatch	·	1.1 km	MPC · JPL
626495	2007 RN_{357}	—	September 12, 2007	Mount Lemmon	Mount Lemmon Survey	·	1.2 km	MPC · JPL
626496	2007 RT_{357}	—	September 15, 2007	Mount Lemmon	Mount Lemmon Survey	·	1.4 km	MPC · JPL
626497	2007 RB_{358}	—	September 11, 2007	Mount Lemmon	Mount Lemmon Survey	·	1.2 km	MPC · JPL
626498	2007 RV_{367}	—	September 14, 2007	Mount Lemmon	Mount Lemmon Survey	·	2.5 km	MPC · JPL
626499	2007 SK_{7}	—	November 19, 2003	Catalina	CSS	·	1.0 km	MPC · JPL
626500	2007 SB_{8}	—	September 18, 2007	Kitt Peak	Spacewatch	·	2.3 km	MPC · JPL

== 626501–626600 ==
back to top

Designation			Discovery			Properties		Ref
Permanent	Provisional	Named after	Date	Site	Discoverer(s)	Category	Diam.	Ref
626501	2007 SF_{12}	—	September 17, 2007	Bergisch Gladbach	W. Bickel	·	1.9 km	MPC · JPL
626502	2007 SJ_{13}	—	September 19, 2007	Kitt Peak	Spacewatch	·	470 m	MPC · JPL
626503	2007 SU_{20}	—	April 4, 2005	Mount Lemmon	Mount Lemmon Survey	·	2.5 km	MPC · JPL
626504	2007 SH_{25}	—	August 12, 2013	Haleakala	Pan-STARRS 1	·	770 m	MPC · JPL
626505	2007 SO_{26}	—	November 10, 2013	Oukaïmeden	C. Rinner	·	2.0 km	MPC · JPL
626506	2007 SF_{28}	—	September 20, 2007	Kitt Peak	Spacewatch	·	1.2 km	MPC · JPL
626507	2007 TG_{3}	—	September 13, 2007	Mount Lemmon	Mount Lemmon Survey	LIX	3.0 km	MPC · JPL
626508	2007 TB_{29}	—	October 4, 2007	Kitt Peak	Spacewatch	·	460 m	MPC · JPL
626509	2007 TG_{33}	—	October 6, 2007	Kitt Peak	Spacewatch	(5)	760 m	MPC · JPL
626510	2007 TS_{37}	—	September 14, 2007	Mount Lemmon	Mount Lemmon Survey	·	500 m	MPC · JPL
626511	2007 TH_{46}	—	October 7, 2007	Mount Lemmon	Mount Lemmon Survey	·	560 m	MPC · JPL
626512	2007 TA_{47}	—	October 4, 2007	Kitt Peak	Spacewatch	·	1.1 km	MPC · JPL
626513	2007 TG_{47}	—	October 4, 2007	Kitt Peak	Spacewatch	·	800 m	MPC · JPL
626514	2007 TL_{47}	—	October 4, 2007	Kitt Peak	Spacewatch	·	1.3 km	MPC · JPL
626515	2007 TW_{48}	—	October 4, 2007	Kitt Peak	Spacewatch	·	1.1 km	MPC · JPL
626516	2007 TS_{58}	—	July 18, 2007	Mount Lemmon	Mount Lemmon Survey	·	490 m	MPC · JPL
626517	2007 TL_{65}	—	September 12, 2007	Mount Lemmon	Mount Lemmon Survey	·	500 m	MPC · JPL
626518	2007 TL_{71}	—	October 12, 2007	Kitt Peak	Spacewatch	T_{j} (2.94)	2.9 km	MPC · JPL
626519	2007 TZ_{72}	—	October 10, 2007	Mount Lemmon	Mount Lemmon Survey	THB	2.1 km	MPC · JPL
626520	2007 TM_{75}	—	September 20, 2007	Kitt Peak	Spacewatch	·	590 m	MPC · JPL
626521	2007 TD_{76}	—	September 12, 2007	Mount Lemmon	Mount Lemmon Survey	·	440 m	MPC · JPL
626522	2007 TD_{88}	—	October 8, 2007	Mount Lemmon	Mount Lemmon Survey	·	2.7 km	MPC · JPL
626523	2007 TG_{91}	—	October 8, 2007	Mount Lemmon	Mount Lemmon Survey	·	1.3 km	MPC · JPL
626524	2007 TS_{98}	—	September 12, 2007	Mount Lemmon	Mount Lemmon Survey	·	470 m	MPC · JPL
626525	2007 TA_{99}	—	October 8, 2007	Mount Lemmon	Mount Lemmon Survey	·	1.1 km	MPC · JPL
626526	2007 TO_{104}	—	September 11, 2007	Catalina	CSS	·	1.1 km	MPC · JPL
626527	2007 TF_{119}	—	October 9, 2007	Mount Lemmon	Mount Lemmon Survey	(5)	780 m	MPC · JPL
626528	2007 TQ_{121}	—	October 6, 2007	Kitt Peak	Spacewatch	EOS	1.6 km	MPC · JPL
626529	2007 TC_{122}	—	October 6, 2007	Kitt Peak	Spacewatch	·	560 m	MPC · JPL
626530	2007 TN_{128}	—	September 12, 2007	Mount Lemmon	Mount Lemmon Survey	·	860 m	MPC · JPL
626531	2007 TF_{134}	—	October 7, 2007	Mount Lemmon	Mount Lemmon Survey	·	1.0 km	MPC · JPL
626532	2007 TQ_{140}	—	October 9, 2007	Mount Lemmon	Mount Lemmon Survey	·	2.4 km	MPC · JPL
626533	2007 TK_{142}	—	October 12, 2007	Dauban	Kugel, C. R. F.	·	3.5 km	MPC · JPL
626534	2007 TK_{146}	—	September 12, 2007	Mount Lemmon	Mount Lemmon Survey	·	1.4 km	MPC · JPL
626535	2007 TE_{149}	—	September 5, 2007	Mount Lemmon	Mount Lemmon Survey	·	1.1 km	MPC · JPL
626536	2007 TV_{150}	—	October 19, 2003	Kitt Peak	Spacewatch	·	890 m	MPC · JPL
626537	2007 TR_{153}	—	September 20, 2007	Catalina	CSS	·	1.3 km	MPC · JPL
626538	2007 TZ_{170}	—	October 12, 2007	Dauban	Kugel, C. R. F.	(194)	620 m	MPC · JPL
626539	2007 TV_{174}	—	October 4, 2007	Catalina	CSS	·	1.2 km	MPC · JPL
626540	2007 TE_{176}	—	October 5, 2007	Kitt Peak	Spacewatch	·	980 m	MPC · JPL
626541	2007 TN_{178}	—	August 10, 2007	Kitt Peak	Spacewatch	THM	1.7 km	MPC · JPL
626542	2007 TM_{183}	—	September 25, 2007	Mount Lemmon	Mount Lemmon Survey	·	2.2 km	MPC · JPL
626543	2007 TP_{188}	—	October 4, 2007	Mount Lemmon	Mount Lemmon Survey	·	740 m	MPC · JPL
626544	2007 TU_{191}	—	September 11, 2007	Mount Lemmon	Mount Lemmon Survey	(1547)	1.0 km	MPC · JPL
626545	2007 TC_{192}	—	October 5, 2007	Kitt Peak	Spacewatch	·	1.8 km	MPC · JPL
626546	2007 TH_{192}	—	October 5, 2007	Kitt Peak	Spacewatch	·	630 m	MPC · JPL
626547	2007 TS_{193}	—	September 12, 2007	Mount Lemmon	Mount Lemmon Survey	·	480 m	MPC · JPL
626548	2007 TT_{198}	—	October 8, 2007	Kitt Peak	Spacewatch	·	460 m	MPC · JPL
626549	2007 TO_{199}	—	October 8, 2007	Kitt Peak	Spacewatch	·	2.1 km	MPC · JPL
626550	2007 TQ_{199}	—	October 8, 2007	Kitt Peak	Spacewatch	·	940 m	MPC · JPL
626551	2007 TY_{208}	—	October 10, 2007	Mount Lemmon	Mount Lemmon Survey	·	430 m	MPC · JPL
626552	2007 TM_{209}	—	August 24, 2007	Kitt Peak	Spacewatch	·	960 m	MPC · JPL
626553	2007 TQ_{209}	—	October 11, 2007	Mount Lemmon	Mount Lemmon Survey	·	1.2 km	MPC · JPL
626554	2007 TF_{210}	—	September 12, 2007	Kitt Peak	Spacewatch	·	2.5 km	MPC · JPL
626555	2007 TO_{211}	—	October 7, 2007	Kitt Peak	Spacewatch	JUN	710 m	MPC · JPL
626556	2007 TU_{220}	—	October 8, 2007	Mount Lemmon	Mount Lemmon Survey	EUN	650 m	MPC · JPL
626557	2007 TK_{223}	—	September 13, 2007	Mount Lemmon	Mount Lemmon Survey	·	2.2 km	MPC · JPL
626558	2007 TF_{237}	—	October 9, 2007	Mount Lemmon	Mount Lemmon Survey	·	1.2 km	MPC · JPL
626559	2007 TT_{247}	—	October 10, 2007	Kitt Peak	Spacewatch	·	2.2 km	MPC · JPL
626560	2007 TW_{256}	—	October 10, 2007	Kitt Peak	Spacewatch	THM	1.8 km	MPC · JPL
626561	2007 TJ_{257}	—	October 10, 2007	Kitt Peak	Spacewatch	MRX	840 m	MPC · JPL
626562	2007 TK_{265}	—	October 27, 2003	Kitt Peak	Spacewatch	·	780 m	MPC · JPL
626563	2007 TJ_{267}	—	October 9, 2007	Kitt Peak	Spacewatch	·	780 m	MPC · JPL
626564	2007 TO_{275}	—	October 11, 2007	Catalina	CSS	·	2.4 km	MPC · JPL
626565	2007 TE_{276}	—	October 11, 2007	Mount Lemmon	Mount Lemmon Survey	·	2.2 km	MPC · JPL
626566	2007 TS_{277}	—	October 11, 2007	Mount Lemmon	Mount Lemmon Survey	·	400 m	MPC · JPL
626567	2007 TJ_{278}	—	September 14, 2007	Mount Lemmon	Mount Lemmon Survey	·	2.4 km	MPC · JPL
626568	2007 TM_{285}	—	October 9, 2007	Mount Lemmon	Mount Lemmon Survey	·	2.0 km	MPC · JPL
626569	2007 TG_{286}	—	October 9, 2007	Mount Lemmon	Mount Lemmon Survey	·	2.5 km	MPC · JPL
626570	2007 TE_{291}	—	October 13, 2007	Catalina	CSS	·	470 m	MPC · JPL
626571	2007 TP_{297}	—	September 10, 2007	Mount Lemmon	Mount Lemmon Survey	TIR	1.9 km	MPC · JPL
626572	2007 TX_{302}	—	October 12, 2007	Kitt Peak	Spacewatch	·	1.4 km	MPC · JPL
626573	2007 TY_{308}	—	October 10, 2007	Mount Lemmon	Mount Lemmon Survey	·	2.5 km	MPC · JPL
626574	2007 TS_{309}	—	September 15, 2007	Mount Lemmon	Mount Lemmon Survey	·	810 m	MPC · JPL
626575	2007 TC_{310}	—	October 11, 2007	Kitt Peak	Spacewatch	PAD	1.1 km	MPC · JPL
626576	2007 TO_{312}	—	October 11, 2007	Mount Lemmon	Mount Lemmon Survey	·	2.5 km	MPC · JPL
626577	2007 TB_{315}	—	October 12, 2007	Kitt Peak	Spacewatch	(5)	770 m	MPC · JPL
626578	2007 TX_{315}	—	October 12, 2007	Kitt Peak	Spacewatch	·	370 m	MPC · JPL
626579	2007 TT_{317}	—	September 26, 2007	Mount Lemmon	Mount Lemmon Survey	·	1.2 km	MPC · JPL
626580	2007 TW_{319}	—	October 12, 2007	Kitt Peak	Spacewatch	VER	1.9 km	MPC · JPL
626581	2007 TL_{320}	—	September 12, 2007	Mount Lemmon	Mount Lemmon Survey	·	2.4 km	MPC · JPL
626582	2007 TE_{321}	—	October 23, 2003	Kitt Peak	Spacewatch	·	920 m	MPC · JPL
626583	2007 TE_{323}	—	November 16, 2003	Kitt Peak	Spacewatch	·	1.1 km	MPC · JPL
626584	2007 TP_{326}	—	October 7, 2007	Kitt Peak	Spacewatch	·	690 m	MPC · JPL
626585	2007 TY_{326}	—	October 11, 2007	Kitt Peak	Spacewatch	·	430 m	MPC · JPL
626586	2007 TZ_{327}	—	October 11, 2007	Kitt Peak	Spacewatch	·	790 m	MPC · JPL
626587	2007 TL_{329}	—	October 11, 2007	Kitt Peak	Spacewatch	·	2.3 km	MPC · JPL
626588	2007 TM_{330}	—	October 11, 2007	Kitt Peak	Spacewatch	·	1.4 km	MPC · JPL
626589	2007 TF_{334}	—	October 11, 2007	Kitt Peak	Spacewatch	AGN	750 m	MPC · JPL
626590	2007 TS_{354}	—	October 10, 2007	Lulin	LUSS	·	3.2 km	MPC · JPL
626591	2007 TA_{358}	—	September 19, 2007	Kitt Peak	Spacewatch	·	2.3 km	MPC · JPL
626592	2007 TY_{363}	—	October 15, 2007	Mount Lemmon	Mount Lemmon Survey	·	540 m	MPC · JPL
626593	2007 TL_{371}	—	July 15, 2007	Siding Spring	SSS	PHO	850 m	MPC · JPL
626594	2007 TY_{372}	—	September 20, 2007	Kitt Peak	Spacewatch	·	980 m	MPC · JPL
626595	2007 TZ_{384}	—	October 14, 2007	Mount Lemmon	Mount Lemmon Survey	·	1.7 km	MPC · JPL
626596	2007 TK_{388}	—	September 13, 2007	Mount Lemmon	Mount Lemmon Survey	THM	1.9 km	MPC · JPL
626597	2007 TA_{400}	—	October 15, 2007	Kitt Peak	Spacewatch	·	1.1 km	MPC · JPL
626598	2007 TS_{400}	—	October 14, 2007	Kitt Peak	Spacewatch	H	400 m	MPC · JPL
626599	2007 TH_{403}	—	October 15, 2007	Mount Lemmon	Mount Lemmon Survey	·	500 m	MPC · JPL
626600	2007 TD_{404}	—	October 7, 2007	Kitt Peak	Spacewatch	·	1.1 km	MPC · JPL

== 626601–626700 ==
back to top

Designation			Discovery			Properties		Ref
Permanent	Provisional	Named after	Date	Site	Discoverer(s)	Category	Diam.	Ref
626601	2007 TL_{404}	—	October 7, 2007	Kitt Peak	Spacewatch	·	620 m	MPC · JPL
626602	2007 TE_{407}	—	October 15, 2007	Mount Lemmon	Mount Lemmon Survey	·	540 m	MPC · JPL
626603	2007 TE_{408}	—	September 10, 2007	Mount Lemmon	Mount Lemmon Survey	·	1.5 km	MPC · JPL
626604	2007 TY_{420}	—	February 14, 2013	Kitt Peak	Spacewatch	·	1.2 km	MPC · JPL
626605	2007 TL_{422}	—	September 21, 2007	XuYi	PMO NEO Survey Program	·	1.2 km	MPC · JPL
626606	2007 TT_{424}	—	October 8, 2007	Mount Lemmon	Mount Lemmon Survey	·	1.9 km	MPC · JPL
626607	2007 TJ_{428}	—	October 10, 2007	Kitt Peak	Spacewatch	LEO	1.2 km	MPC · JPL
626608	2007 TL_{428}	—	October 11, 2007	Mount Lemmon	Mount Lemmon Survey	·	460 m	MPC · JPL
626609	2007 TM_{428}	—	September 8, 2007	Mount Lemmon	Mount Lemmon Survey	·	290 m	MPC · JPL
626610	2007 TZ_{435}	—	October 14, 2007	Mount Lemmon	Mount Lemmon Survey	·	1.2 km	MPC · JPL
626611	2007 TN_{441}	—	October 14, 2007	Črni Vrh	Skvarč, J.	·	1.8 km	MPC · JPL
626612	2007 TL_{446}	—	October 9, 2007	Kitt Peak	Spacewatch	·	2.3 km	MPC · JPL
626613	2007 TA_{447}	—	October 10, 2007	Mount Lemmon	Mount Lemmon Survey	·	2.1 km	MPC · JPL
626614	2007 TY_{457}	—	October 10, 2007	Catalina	CSS	·	730 m	MPC · JPL
626615	2007 TD_{458}	—	October 10, 2007	Mount Lemmon	Mount Lemmon Survey	·	640 m	MPC · JPL
626616	2007 TO_{458}	—	November 19, 2003	Kitt Peak	Spacewatch	·	630 m	MPC · JPL
626617	2007 TX_{458}	—	October 14, 2007	Catalina	CSS	·	970 m	MPC · JPL
626618	2007 TY_{458}	—	October 14, 2007	Mount Lemmon	Mount Lemmon Survey	·	680 m	MPC · JPL
626619	2007 TV_{461}	—	October 11, 2007	Mount Lemmon	Mount Lemmon Survey	·	480 m	MPC · JPL
626620	2007 TU_{464}	—	October 10, 2007	Kitt Peak	Spacewatch	THM	1.8 km	MPC · JPL
626621	2007 TM_{466}	—	September 12, 2007	Kitt Peak	Spacewatch	·	2.5 km	MPC · JPL
626622	2007 TR_{467}	—	October 7, 2013	Mount Lemmon	Mount Lemmon Survey	·	2.5 km	MPC · JPL
626623	2007 TA_{469}	—	October 10, 2007	Mount Lemmon	Mount Lemmon Survey	·	2.3 km	MPC · JPL
626624	2007 TT_{469}	—	October 10, 2007	Kitt Peak	Spacewatch	·	2.3 km	MPC · JPL
626625	2007 TF_{471}	—	October 13, 2007	Mount Lemmon	Mount Lemmon Survey	TIR	2.3 km	MPC · JPL
626626	2007 TD_{472}	—	October 9, 2007	Mount Lemmon	Mount Lemmon Survey	TIR	2.1 km	MPC · JPL
626627	2007 TD_{474}	—	October 9, 2007	Kitt Peak	Spacewatch	·	890 m	MPC · JPL
626628	2007 TA_{475}	—	October 11, 2007	Mount Lemmon	Mount Lemmon Survey	·	1.2 km	MPC · JPL
626629	2007 TS_{476}	—	July 25, 2015	Haleakala	Pan-STARRS 1	·	1.0 km	MPC · JPL
626630	2007 TT_{477}	—	October 4, 2007	Kitt Peak	Spacewatch	·	2.4 km	MPC · JPL
626631	2007 TS_{479}	—	October 12, 2007	Mount Lemmon	Mount Lemmon Survey	·	2.4 km	MPC · JPL
626632	2007 TU_{479}	—	October 8, 2007	Catalina	CSS	·	1.4 km	MPC · JPL
626633	2007 TE_{480}	—	October 12, 2007	Mount Lemmon	Mount Lemmon Survey	·	930 m	MPC · JPL
626634	2007 TF_{481}	—	October 12, 2007	Kitt Peak	Spacewatch	·	1.9 km	MPC · JPL
626635	2007 TS_{481}	—	October 11, 2007	Mount Lemmon	Mount Lemmon Survey	·	2.2 km	MPC · JPL
626636	2007 TK_{482}	—	October 8, 2007	Bergisch Gladbach	W. Bickel	·	2.6 km	MPC · JPL
626637	2007 TP_{483}	—	October 8, 2007	Catalina	CSS	·	1.3 km	MPC · JPL
626638	2007 TB_{485}	—	October 15, 2007	Mount Lemmon	Mount Lemmon Survey	·	1.6 km	MPC · JPL
626639	2007 TC_{499}	—	October 12, 2007	Mount Lemmon	Mount Lemmon Survey	·	2.3 km	MPC · JPL
626640	2007 UK_{6}	—	October 19, 2007	Lulin	LUSS	H	510 m	MPC · JPL
626641	2007 UD_{13}	—	October 7, 2007	Mount Lemmon	Mount Lemmon Survey	·	2.3 km	MPC · JPL
626642	2007 UE_{16}	—	October 18, 2007	Mount Lemmon	Mount Lemmon Survey	·	460 m	MPC · JPL
626643	2007 UZ_{26}	—	October 16, 2007	Mount Lemmon	Mount Lemmon Survey	NYS	850 m	MPC · JPL
626644	2007 UR_{29}	—	October 6, 2007	7300	W. K. Y. Yeung	·	1.1 km	MPC · JPL
626645	2007 UU_{31}	—	October 19, 2007	Mount Lemmon	Mount Lemmon Survey	·	2.5 km	MPC · JPL
626646	2007 US_{32}	—	October 19, 2007	Mount Lemmon	Mount Lemmon Survey	·	880 m	MPC · JPL
626647	2007 UD_{33}	—	September 13, 2007	Catalina	CSS	·	1.2 km	MPC · JPL
626648	2007 UB_{35}	—	October 19, 2007	Kitt Peak	Spacewatch	·	1.1 km	MPC · JPL
626649	2007 UQ_{39}	—	October 20, 2007	Mount Lemmon	Mount Lemmon Survey	·	840 m	MPC · JPL
626650	2007 UV_{50}	—	October 24, 2007	Mount Lemmon	Mount Lemmon Survey	·	2.8 km	MPC · JPL
626651	2007 UV_{57}	—	October 30, 2007	Mount Lemmon	Mount Lemmon Survey	·	500 m	MPC · JPL
626652	2007 UF_{59}	—	October 11, 2007	Kitt Peak	Spacewatch	·	2.0 km	MPC · JPL
626653	2007 UD_{64}	—	October 7, 2007	Mount Lemmon	Mount Lemmon Survey	·	460 m	MPC · JPL
626654	2007 UZ_{66}	—	October 30, 2007	Kitt Peak	Spacewatch	·	1.9 km	MPC · JPL
626655	2007 UD_{67}	—	October 8, 2007	Mount Lemmon	Mount Lemmon Survey	·	410 m	MPC · JPL
626656	2007 UR_{68}	—	October 12, 2007	Kitt Peak	Spacewatch	·	930 m	MPC · JPL
626657	2007 UY_{70}	—	October 10, 2007	Kitt Peak	Spacewatch	MAR	760 m	MPC · JPL
626658	2007 UC_{75}	—	October 18, 2007	Kitt Peak	Spacewatch	·	2.0 km	MPC · JPL
626659	2007 UD_{85}	—	October 18, 2007	Mount Lemmon	Mount Lemmon Survey	(5)	600 m	MPC · JPL
626660	2007 UC_{90}	—	October 11, 2007	Kitt Peak	Spacewatch	EUN	840 m	MPC · JPL
626661	2007 UQ_{98}	—	October 30, 2007	Kitt Peak	Spacewatch	KON	1.6 km	MPC · JPL
626662	2007 UL_{101}	—	October 30, 2007	Kitt Peak	Spacewatch	·	560 m	MPC · JPL
626663	2007 UQ_{108}	—	October 30, 2007	Kitt Peak	Spacewatch	THM	1.8 km	MPC · JPL
626664	2007 UU_{113}	—	October 31, 2007	Kitt Peak	Spacewatch	·	590 m	MPC · JPL
626665	2007 UW_{113}	—	October 31, 2007	Kitt Peak	Spacewatch	H	470 m	MPC · JPL
626666	2007 UY_{113}	—	October 11, 2007	Kitt Peak	Spacewatch	·	780 m	MPC · JPL
626667	2007 UU_{135}	—	October 30, 2007	Mount Lemmon	Mount Lemmon Survey	·	400 m	MPC · JPL
626668	2007 UU_{139}	—	October 8, 2007	Catalina	CSS	·	540 m	MPC · JPL
626669	2007 UE_{141}	—	October 21, 2007	Mount Lemmon	Mount Lemmon Survey	ADE	1.5 km	MPC · JPL
626670	2007 UU_{143}	—	October 16, 2007	Mount Lemmon	Mount Lemmon Survey	·	1.5 km	MPC · JPL
626671	2007 UX_{144}	—	October 21, 2007	Mount Lemmon	Mount Lemmon Survey	H	380 m	MPC · JPL
626672	2007 UQ_{145}	—	October 21, 2007	Kitt Peak	Spacewatch	·	2.2 km	MPC · JPL
626673	2007 UU_{145}	—	October 30, 2007	Mount Lemmon	Mount Lemmon Survey	·	820 m	MPC · JPL
626674	2007 UA_{147}	—	July 9, 2015	Haleakala	Pan-STARRS 1	·	1.2 km	MPC · JPL
626675	2007 UN_{147}	—	October 19, 2007	Catalina	CSS	·	500 m	MPC · JPL
626676	2007 UR_{149}	—	October 19, 2007	Mount Lemmon	Mount Lemmon Survey	·	2.1 km	MPC · JPL
626677	2007 UZ_{149}	—	November 25, 2016	Mount Lemmon	Mount Lemmon Survey	·	1.5 km	MPC · JPL
626678	2007 UF_{150}	—	October 20, 2007	Mount Lemmon	Mount Lemmon Survey	·	1.8 km	MPC · JPL
626679	2007 UG_{150}	—	July 15, 2017	Haleakala	Pan-STARRS 1	·	2.2 km	MPC · JPL
626680	2007 UG_{152}	—	July 28, 2015	Haleakala	Pan-STARRS 1	·	810 m	MPC · JPL
626681	2007 UK_{153}	—	January 3, 2017	Haleakala	Pan-STARRS 1	·	920 m	MPC · JPL
626682	2007 UT_{153}	—	October 30, 2007	Kitt Peak	Spacewatch	·	440 m	MPC · JPL
626683	2007 UJ_{155}	—	October 20, 2007	Mount Lemmon	Mount Lemmon Survey	·	2.1 km	MPC · JPL
626684	2007 UX_{155}	—	October 16, 2007	Mount Lemmon	Mount Lemmon Survey	·	520 m	MPC · JPL
626685	2007 UY_{157}	—	October 24, 2007	Mount Lemmon	Mount Lemmon Survey	JUN	820 m	MPC · JPL
626686	2007 UT_{159}	—	October 20, 2007	Mount Lemmon	Mount Lemmon Survey	·	420 m	MPC · JPL
626687	2007 VC_{8}	—	November 4, 2007	Mount Lemmon	Mount Lemmon Survey	·	1.4 km	MPC · JPL
626688	2007 VR_{8}	—	October 15, 2007	Catalina	CSS	H	440 m	MPC · JPL
626689	2007 VY_{12}	—	November 1, 2007	Mount Lemmon	Mount Lemmon Survey	·	2.0 km	MPC · JPL
626690	2007 VB_{13}	—	October 7, 2007	Mount Lemmon	Mount Lemmon Survey	KON	1.9 km	MPC · JPL
626691	2007 VH_{15}	—	October 9, 2007	Mount Lemmon	Mount Lemmon Survey	·	1.9 km	MPC · JPL
626692	2007 VK_{15}	—	May 9, 2004	Kitt Peak	Spacewatch	T_{j} (2.93)	3.5 km	MPC · JPL
626693	2007 VE_{20}	—	November 1, 2007	Kitt Peak	Spacewatch	·	2.3 km	MPC · JPL
626694	2007 VZ_{25}	—	November 2, 2007	Mount Lemmon	Mount Lemmon Survey	·	470 m	MPC · JPL
626695	2007 VE_{28}	—	November 2, 2007	Kitt Peak	Spacewatch	·	2.5 km	MPC · JPL
626696	2007 VY_{33}	—	November 2, 2007	Kitt Peak	Spacewatch	·	1.3 km	MPC · JPL
626697	2007 VX_{44}	—	September 26, 2007	Mount Lemmon	Mount Lemmon Survey	·	510 m	MPC · JPL
626698	2007 VJ_{47}	—	October 7, 2007	Kitt Peak	Spacewatch	·	2.3 km	MPC · JPL
626699	2007 VM_{48}	—	November 1, 2007	Kitt Peak	Spacewatch	·	2.4 km	MPC · JPL
626700	2007 VC_{53}	—	October 20, 2007	Mount Lemmon	Mount Lemmon Survey	·	1.5 km	MPC · JPL

== 626701–626800 ==
back to top

Designation			Discovery			Properties		Ref
Permanent	Provisional	Named after	Date	Site	Discoverer(s)	Category	Diam.	Ref
626701	2007 VZ_{54}	—	November 1, 2007	Kitt Peak	Spacewatch	·	410 m	MPC · JPL
626702	2007 VQ_{58}	—	October 21, 2007	Mount Lemmon	Mount Lemmon Survey	·	1.7 km	MPC · JPL
626703	2007 VJ_{68}	—	September 15, 2007	Mount Lemmon	Mount Lemmon Survey	·	510 m	MPC · JPL
626704	2007 VK_{87}	—	September 10, 2007	Mount Lemmon	Mount Lemmon Survey	·	3.4 km	MPC · JPL
626705	2007 VR_{89}	—	October 10, 2007	Mount Lemmon	Mount Lemmon Survey	·	1.1 km	MPC · JPL
626706	2007 VG_{92}	—	November 8, 2007	Socorro	LINEAR	H	390 m	MPC · JPL
626707	2007 VN_{99}	—	November 2, 2007	Kitt Peak	Spacewatch	·	1.3 km	MPC · JPL
626708	2007 VS_{105}	—	November 3, 2007	Kitt Peak	Spacewatch	KON	1.4 km	MPC · JPL
626709	2007 VR_{108}	—	October 17, 2007	Mount Lemmon	Mount Lemmon Survey	·	1.1 km	MPC · JPL
626710	2007 VW_{109}	—	November 3, 2007	Kitt Peak	Spacewatch	·	2.2 km	MPC · JPL
626711	2007 VR_{114}	—	November 3, 2007	Kitt Peak	Spacewatch	(5)	860 m	MPC · JPL
626712	2007 VX_{117}	—	November 4, 2007	Kitt Peak	Spacewatch	·	1.4 km	MPC · JPL
626713	2007 VO_{121}	—	November 5, 2007	Kitt Peak	Spacewatch	(5)	900 m	MPC · JPL
626714	2007 VL_{135}	—	November 3, 2007	Mount Lemmon	Mount Lemmon Survey	·	990 m	MPC · JPL
626715	2007 VA_{137}	—	October 9, 2007	Kitt Peak	Spacewatch	HYG	2.2 km	MPC · JPL
626716	2007 VT_{138}	—	January 31, 2004	Apache Point	SDSS Collaboration	·	1.3 km	MPC · JPL
626717	2007 VH_{143}	—	October 20, 2007	Mount Lemmon	Mount Lemmon Survey	·	1.3 km	MPC · JPL
626718	2007 VM_{144}	—	November 4, 2007	Kitt Peak	Spacewatch	·	930 m	MPC · JPL
626719	2007 VE_{155}	—	November 5, 2007	Kitt Peak	Spacewatch	ADE	1.4 km	MPC · JPL
626720	2007 VN_{156}	—	October 8, 2007	Mount Lemmon	Mount Lemmon Survey	·	400 m	MPC · JPL
626721	2007 VH_{160}	—	October 14, 2007	Mount Lemmon	Mount Lemmon Survey	KON	1.9 km	MPC · JPL
626722	2007 VN_{162}	—	November 5, 2007	Kitt Peak	Spacewatch	·	1.0 km	MPC · JPL
626723	2007 VB_{171}	—	October 9, 2007	Kitt Peak	Spacewatch	·	2.2 km	MPC · JPL
626724	2007 VW_{187}	—	November 12, 2007	Mount Lemmon	Mount Lemmon Survey	·	1.4 km	MPC · JPL
626725	2007 VD_{188}	—	September 27, 2007	Mount Lemmon	Mount Lemmon Survey	·	1.9 km	MPC · JPL
626726	2007 VL_{194}	—	November 5, 2007	Mount Lemmon	Mount Lemmon Survey	·	550 m	MPC · JPL
626727	2007 VS_{196}	—	November 7, 2007	Mount Lemmon	Mount Lemmon Survey	(5)	810 m	MPC · JPL
626728	2007 VW_{203}	—	October 14, 2007	Mount Lemmon	Mount Lemmon Survey	·	550 m	MPC · JPL
626729	2007 VZ_{222}	—	November 7, 2007	Mount Lemmon	Mount Lemmon Survey	·	800 m	MPC · JPL
626730	2007 VL_{226}	—	October 12, 2007	Kitt Peak	Spacewatch	·	1.2 km	MPC · JPL
626731	2007 VW_{228}	—	October 30, 2007	Kitt Peak	Spacewatch	·	490 m	MPC · JPL
626732	2007 VC_{230}	—	November 7, 2007	Kitt Peak	Spacewatch	THM	1.7 km	MPC · JPL
626733	2007 VG_{238}	—	October 19, 2007	Kitt Peak	Spacewatch	EUP	3.1 km	MPC · JPL
626734	2007 VT_{240}	—	November 2, 2007	Catalina	CSS	·	1.2 km	MPC · JPL
626735	2007 VD_{241}	—	November 2, 2007	Catalina	CSS	·	670 m	MPC · JPL
626736	2007 VK_{250}	—	October 12, 2007	Mount Lemmon	Mount Lemmon Survey	·	660 m	MPC · JPL
626737	2007 VQ_{255}	—	October 21, 2007	Kitt Peak	Spacewatch	·	920 m	MPC · JPL
626738	2007 VC_{259}	—	November 15, 2007	Mount Lemmon	Mount Lemmon Survey	EUN	940 m	MPC · JPL
626739	2007 VU_{267}	—	October 24, 2007	Mount Lemmon	Mount Lemmon Survey	·	1.3 km	MPC · JPL
626740	2007 VS_{268}	—	September 10, 2007	Mount Lemmon	Mount Lemmon Survey	·	1.5 km	MPC · JPL
626741	2007 VD_{272}	—	October 10, 2007	Kitt Peak	Spacewatch	·	730 m	MPC · JPL
626742	2007 VH_{275}	—	October 16, 2007	Mount Lemmon	Mount Lemmon Survey	·	570 m	MPC · JPL
626743	2007 VX_{276}	—	October 11, 2007	Kitt Peak	Spacewatch	·	880 m	MPC · JPL
626744	2007 VZ_{286}	—	October 21, 2007	Kitt Peak	Spacewatch	(5)	880 m	MPC · JPL
626745	2007 VX_{290}	—	November 1, 2007	Kitt Peak	Spacewatch	·	870 m	MPC · JPL
626746	2007 VK_{298}	—	November 11, 2007	Catalina	CSS	·	1.2 km	MPC · JPL
626747	2007 VP_{300}	—	September 27, 2007	Mount Lemmon	Mount Lemmon Survey	·	1.1 km	MPC · JPL
626748	2007 VW_{306}	—	November 2, 2007	Mount Lemmon	Mount Lemmon Survey	H	340 m	MPC · JPL
626749	2007 VO_{307}	—	November 3, 2007	Kitt Peak	Spacewatch	·	710 m	MPC · JPL
626750	2007 VW_{316}	—	November 11, 2007	Mount Lemmon	Mount Lemmon Survey	(5)	1.0 km	MPC · JPL
626751	2007 VO_{321}	—	November 2, 2007	Catalina	CSS	(5)	760 m	MPC · JPL
626752	2007 VS_{322}	—	September 8, 2007	Mount Lemmon	Mount Lemmon Survey	·	540 m	MPC · JPL
626753	2007 VW_{322}	—	November 7, 2007	Kitt Peak	Spacewatch	·	1.2 km	MPC · JPL
626754	2007 VL_{323}	—	September 10, 2007	Mount Lemmon	Mount Lemmon Survey	·	750 m	MPC · JPL
626755	2007 VY_{326}	—	November 19, 2007	Kitt Peak	Spacewatch	·	1.2 km	MPC · JPL
626756	2007 VY_{328}	—	November 12, 2007	Socorro	LINEAR	(5)	950 m	MPC · JPL
626757	2007 VE_{336}	—	November 9, 2007	Mount Lemmon	Mount Lemmon Survey	·	1.0 km	MPC · JPL
626758	2007 VP_{339}	—	November 2, 2007	Mount Lemmon	Mount Lemmon Survey	·	840 m	MPC · JPL
626759	2007 VY_{342}	—	April 15, 2012	Haleakala	Pan-STARRS 1	·	480 m	MPC · JPL
626760	2007 VD_{346}	—	October 7, 2011	Charleston	R. Holmes	·	1.0 km	MPC · JPL
626761	2007 VL_{346}	—	November 3, 2007	Kitt Peak	Spacewatch	·	480 m	MPC · JPL
626762	2007 VD_{349}	—	February 15, 2013	Haleakala	Pan-STARRS 1	·	980 m	MPC · JPL
626763	2007 VK_{349}	—	July 4, 2017	Haleakala	Pan-STARRS 1	·	2.3 km	MPC · JPL
626764	2007 VA_{350}	—	October 19, 2015	Haleakala	Pan-STARRS 1	·	1.0 km	MPC · JPL
626765	2007 VK_{350}	—	November 7, 2007	Catalina	CSS	·	1.0 km	MPC · JPL
626766	2007 VM_{350}	—	November 15, 2007	Mount Lemmon	Mount Lemmon Survey	·	2.3 km	MPC · JPL
626767	2007 VQ_{350}	—	November 9, 2007	Kitt Peak	Spacewatch	·	2.8 km	MPC · JPL
626768	2007 VT_{350}	—	November 4, 2007	Mount Lemmon	Mount Lemmon Survey	(5)	960 m	MPC · JPL
626769	2007 VN_{351}	—	February 22, 2009	Kitt Peak	Spacewatch	·	1.3 km	MPC · JPL
626770	2007 VQ_{351}	—	May 2, 2016	Haleakala	Pan-STARRS 1	·	630 m	MPC · JPL
626771	2007 VE_{353}	—	September 15, 2007	Kitt Peak	Spacewatch	·	1.7 km	MPC · JPL
626772	2007 VN_{356}	—	October 8, 2007	Mount Lemmon	Mount Lemmon Survey	·	1.4 km	MPC · JPL
626773	2007 VH_{357}	—	November 1, 2007	Kitt Peak	Spacewatch	·	520 m	MPC · JPL
626774	2007 VV_{357}	—	October 21, 2007	Mount Lemmon	Mount Lemmon Survey	·	1.3 km	MPC · JPL
626775	2007 VH_{358}	—	May 24, 2014	Haleakala	Pan-STARRS 1	H	490 m	MPC · JPL
626776	2007 VL_{358}	—	May 22, 2015	Haleakala	Pan-STARRS 1	·	1.4 km	MPC · JPL
626777	2007 VW_{358}	—	November 7, 2007	Kitt Peak	Spacewatch	·	360 m	MPC · JPL
626778	2007 VC_{359}	—	November 2, 2007	Mount Lemmon	Mount Lemmon Survey	·	600 m	MPC · JPL
626779	2007 VV_{359}	—	November 2, 2007	Kitt Peak	Spacewatch	·	1.0 km	MPC · JPL
626780	2007 VB_{361}	—	January 27, 2009	Cerro Burek	Burek, Cerro	·	2.2 km	MPC · JPL
626781	2007 VN_{362}	—	January 17, 2009	Kitt Peak	Spacewatch	THM	1.6 km	MPC · JPL
626782	2007 VR_{362}	—	November 8, 2007	Kitt Peak	Spacewatch	·	930 m	MPC · JPL
626783	2007 VE_{364}	—	November 8, 2007	Kitt Peak	Spacewatch	·	2.0 km	MPC · JPL
626784	2007 VR_{365}	—	November 4, 2007	Mount Lemmon	Mount Lemmon Survey	·	520 m	MPC · JPL
626785	2007 VU_{365}	—	November 4, 2007	Kitt Peak	Spacewatch	·	410 m	MPC · JPL
626786	2007 VY_{365}	—	November 14, 2007	Kitt Peak	Spacewatch	·	570 m	MPC · JPL
626787	2007 VZ_{368}	—	November 13, 2007	Catalina	CSS	·	1.4 km	MPC · JPL
626788	2007 VA_{370}	—	November 5, 2007	Kitt Peak	Spacewatch	·	750 m	MPC · JPL
626789	2007 VN_{371}	—	November 3, 2007	Kitt Peak	Spacewatch	·	2.1 km	MPC · JPL
626790	2007 VM_{372}	—	November 4, 2007	Catalina	CSS	·	1.1 km	MPC · JPL
626791	2007 VO_{372}	—	November 12, 2007	Mount Lemmon	Mount Lemmon Survey	·	1.3 km	MPC · JPL
626792	2007 VT_{372}	—	November 14, 2007	Mount Lemmon	Mount Lemmon Survey	·	1 km	MPC · JPL
626793	2007 VK_{374}	—	November 9, 2007	Kitt Peak	Spacewatch	VER	2.2 km	MPC · JPL
626794	2007 VH_{381}	—	November 11, 2007	Mount Lemmon	Mount Lemmon Survey	·	600 m	MPC · JPL
626795	2007 VB_{382}	—	November 3, 2007	Kitt Peak	Spacewatch	·	1.3 km	MPC · JPL
626796	2007 WZ_{2}	—	November 16, 2007	Mount Lemmon	Mount Lemmon Survey	(1547)	1.3 km	MPC · JPL
626797	2007 WW_{13}	—	November 18, 2007	Mount Lemmon	Mount Lemmon Survey	·	1.2 km	MPC · JPL
626798	2007 WK_{22}	—	October 9, 2007	Kitt Peak	Spacewatch	·	2.1 km	MPC · JPL
626799	2007 WM_{28}	—	November 19, 2007	Kitt Peak	Spacewatch	·	800 m	MPC · JPL
626800	2007 WZ_{30}	—	November 19, 2007	Kitt Peak	Spacewatch	·	630 m	MPC · JPL

== 626801–626900 ==
back to top

Designation			Discovery			Properties		Ref
Permanent	Provisional	Named after	Date	Site	Discoverer(s)	Category	Diam.	Ref
626801	2007 WH_{32}	—	November 19, 2007	Mount Lemmon	Mount Lemmon Survey	KON	1.9 km	MPC · JPL
626802	2007 WH_{34}	—	November 4, 2007	Kitt Peak	Spacewatch	·	830 m	MPC · JPL
626803	2007 WU_{34}	—	November 19, 2007	Mount Lemmon	Mount Lemmon Survey	·	1.1 km	MPC · JPL
626804	2007 WN_{48}	—	November 4, 2007	Kitt Peak	Spacewatch	·	1.1 km	MPC · JPL
626805	2007 WB_{50}	—	November 20, 2007	Mount Lemmon	Mount Lemmon Survey	·	2.3 km	MPC · JPL
626806	2007 WF_{52}	—	November 20, 2007	Mount Lemmon	Mount Lemmon Survey	VER	2.4 km	MPC · JPL
626807	2007 WR_{55}	—	October 16, 2007	Mount Lemmon	Mount Lemmon Survey	(5)	1.0 km	MPC · JPL
626808	2007 WZ_{59}	—	November 20, 2007	Kitt Peak	Spacewatch	(1547)	1.4 km	MPC · JPL
626809	2007 WX_{62}	—	November 4, 2007	Kitt Peak	Spacewatch	·	1.4 km	MPC · JPL
626810	2007 WT_{70}	—	November 18, 2007	Mount Lemmon	Mount Lemmon Survey	·	1.2 km	MPC · JPL
626811	2007 WA_{71}	—	November 5, 2018	Haleakala	Pan-STARRS 2	EOS	1.7 km	MPC · JPL
626812	2007 WV_{71}	—	November 20, 2007	Kitt Peak	Spacewatch	·	2.1 km	MPC · JPL
626813	2007 XT_{2}	—	November 11, 2007	Mount Lemmon	Mount Lemmon Survey	EUP	3.2 km	MPC · JPL
626814	2007 XS_{4}	—	December 3, 2007	Kitt Peak	Spacewatch	·	620 m	MPC · JPL
626815	2007 XH_{8}	—	December 4, 2007	Mount Lemmon	Mount Lemmon Survey	·	1.4 km	MPC · JPL
626816	2007 XW_{11}	—	November 7, 2007	Kitt Peak	Spacewatch	·	1.4 km	MPC · JPL
626817	2007 XY_{12}	—	December 4, 2007	Kitt Peak	Spacewatch	·	550 m	MPC · JPL
626818	2007 XW_{13}	—	November 4, 2007	Kitt Peak	Spacewatch	·	450 m	MPC · JPL
626819	2007 XJ_{15}	—	December 7, 2007	Bisei	BATTeRS	BAR	990 m	MPC · JPL
626820	2007 XT_{19}	—	December 12, 2007	Socorro	LINEAR	H	490 m	MPC · JPL
626821	2007 XR_{20}	—	December 13, 2007	Junk Bond	D. Healy	·	1.5 km	MPC · JPL
626822	2007 XZ_{22}	—	November 5, 2007	Kitt Peak	Spacewatch	·	1.1 km	MPC · JPL
626823	2007 XA_{24}	—	December 15, 2007	Catalina	CSS	T_{j} (2.9)	2.2 km	MPC · JPL
626824	2007 XB_{29}	—	December 15, 2007	Kitt Peak	Spacewatch	·	460 m	MPC · JPL
626825	2007 XO_{29}	—	October 19, 2007	Kitt Peak	Spacewatch	critical	890 m	MPC · JPL
626826	2007 XM_{35}	—	December 16, 2007	Mount Lemmon	Mount Lemmon Survey	LIX	2.6 km	MPC · JPL
626827	2007 XB_{36}	—	December 4, 2007	Catalina	CSS	·	660 m	MPC · JPL
626828	2007 XA_{48}	—	December 15, 2007	Kitt Peak	Spacewatch	(5)	750 m	MPC · JPL
626829	2007 XX_{49}	—	December 15, 2007	Kitt Peak	Spacewatch	·	820 m	MPC · JPL
626830	2007 XK_{56}	—	December 3, 2007	Kitt Peak	Spacewatch	·	1.3 km	MPC · JPL
626831	2007 XN_{62}	—	July 1, 2014	Haleakala	Pan-STARRS 1	·	1.4 km	MPC · JPL
626832	2007 XH_{63}	—	December 5, 2007	Kitt Peak	Spacewatch	·	800 m	MPC · JPL
626833	2007 XY_{63}	—	December 5, 2007	Kitt Peak	Spacewatch	·	1.2 km	MPC · JPL
626834	2007 XN_{65}	—	October 13, 2010	Mount Lemmon	Mount Lemmon Survey	·	590 m	MPC · JPL
626835	2007 XY_{68}	—	December 15, 2007	Mount Lemmon	Mount Lemmon Survey	·	910 m	MPC · JPL
626836	2007 YX	—	December 16, 2007	Bergisch Gladbach	W. Bickel	JUN	800 m	MPC · JPL
626837	2007 YZ_{1}	—	December 15, 2007	Kitt Peak	Spacewatch	·	1 km	MPC · JPL
626838	2007 YR_{4}	—	November 17, 2007	Mount Lemmon	Mount Lemmon Survey	·	670 m	MPC · JPL
626839	2007 YZ_{4}	—	December 21, 2003	Kitt Peak	Spacewatch	·	900 m	MPC · JPL
626840	2007 YC_{6}	—	November 12, 2007	Mount Lemmon	Mount Lemmon Survey	·	1.1 km	MPC · JPL
626841	2007 YG_{7}	—	October 16, 2007	Mount Lemmon	Mount Lemmon Survey	(5)	840 m	MPC · JPL
626842	2007 YS_{7}	—	December 6, 2007	Mount Lemmon	Mount Lemmon Survey	·	1.0 km	MPC · JPL
626843	2007 YY_{14}	—	December 16, 2007	Catalina	CSS	H	440 m	MPC · JPL
626844	2007 YJ_{18}	—	December 16, 2007	Kitt Peak	Spacewatch	·	710 m	MPC · JPL
626845	2007 YM_{20}	—	December 5, 2007	Kitt Peak	Spacewatch	·	730 m	MPC · JPL
626846	2007 YX_{33}	—	December 28, 2007	Kitt Peak	Spacewatch	·	530 m	MPC · JPL
626847	2007 YL_{56}	—	December 15, 2007	Kitt Peak	Spacewatch	·	1.9 km	MPC · JPL
626848	2007 YJ_{62}	—	December 30, 2007	Kitt Peak	Spacewatch	·	600 m	MPC · JPL
626849	2007 YJ_{66}	—	December 30, 2007	Mount Lemmon	Mount Lemmon Survey	(5)	980 m	MPC · JPL
626850	2007 YS_{73}	—	December 30, 2007	Mount Lemmon	Mount Lemmon Survey	·	1.8 km	MPC · JPL
626851	2007 YV_{73}	—	December 31, 2007	Kitt Peak	Spacewatch	·	1.2 km	MPC · JPL
626852	2007 YE_{74}	—	December 31, 2007	Mount Lemmon	Mount Lemmon Survey	·	500 m	MPC · JPL
626853	2007 YN_{76}	—	December 17, 2007	Mount Lemmon	Mount Lemmon Survey	·	1.2 km	MPC · JPL
626854	2007 YU_{76}	—	December 18, 2007	Mount Lemmon	Mount Lemmon Survey	·	1.1 km	MPC · JPL
626855	2007 YF_{77}	—	December 21, 2007	Mount Lemmon	Mount Lemmon Survey	JUN	760 m	MPC · JPL
626856	2007 YL_{78}	—	December 18, 2007	Mount Lemmon	Mount Lemmon Survey	·	3.6 km	MPC · JPL
626857	2007 YW_{78}	—	February 27, 2012	Haleakala	Pan-STARRS 1	·	860 m	MPC · JPL
626858	2007 YO_{80}	—	October 12, 2010	Mount Lemmon	Mount Lemmon Survey	·	540 m	MPC · JPL
626859	2007 YW_{80}	—	December 19, 2007	Mount Lemmon	Mount Lemmon Survey	·	450 m	MPC · JPL
626860	2007 YC_{81}	—	July 19, 2015	Haleakala	Pan-STARRS 1	·	1.4 km	MPC · JPL
626861	2007 YX_{82}	—	December 30, 2007	Kitt Peak	Spacewatch	·	1.0 km	MPC · JPL
626862	2007 YP_{83}	—	December 18, 2007	Mount Lemmon	Mount Lemmon Survey	H	400 m	MPC · JPL
626863	2007 YT_{83}	—	December 16, 2007	Mount Lemmon	Mount Lemmon Survey	·	1.1 km	MPC · JPL
626864	2007 YX_{83}	—	September 23, 2011	Kitt Peak	Spacewatch	·	1.3 km	MPC · JPL
626865	2007 YL_{84}	—	January 27, 2017	Haleakala	Pan-STARRS 1	HNS	810 m	MPC · JPL
626866	2007 YB_{87}	—	November 3, 2011	Mount Lemmon	Mount Lemmon Survey	·	1.1 km	MPC · JPL
626867	2007 YM_{88}	—	December 16, 2007	Mount Lemmon	Mount Lemmon Survey	(5)	960 m	MPC · JPL
626868	2007 YC_{92}	—	December 31, 2007	Kitt Peak	Spacewatch	·	510 m	MPC · JPL
626869	2007 YM_{92}	—	December 30, 2007	Kitt Peak	Spacewatch	·	720 m	MPC · JPL
626870	2007 YT_{92}	—	December 30, 2007	Kitt Peak	Spacewatch	·	500 m	MPC · JPL
626871	2007 YL_{94}	—	December 31, 2007	Kitt Peak	Spacewatch	·	550 m	MPC · JPL
626872	2008 AU	—	November 3, 2007	Kitt Peak	Spacewatch	·	680 m	MPC · JPL
626873	2008 AU_{6}	—	December 4, 2007	Mount Lemmon	Mount Lemmon Survey	·	810 m	MPC · JPL
626874	2008 AD_{8}	—	December 31, 2007	Kitt Peak	Spacewatch	·	1.2 km	MPC · JPL
626875	2008 AT_{16}	—	January 10, 2008	Kitt Peak	Spacewatch	·	1.2 km	MPC · JPL
626876	2008 AW_{22}	—	January 10, 2008	Mount Lemmon	Mount Lemmon Survey	·	1 km	MPC · JPL
626877	2008 AM_{29}	—	January 12, 2008	Catalina	CSS	·	930 m	MPC · JPL
626878	2008 AX_{29}	—	December 4, 2007	Kitt Peak	Spacewatch	GAL	1.6 km	MPC · JPL
626879	2008 AR_{32}	—	November 8, 2007	Mount Lemmon	Mount Lemmon Survey	·	1.1 km	MPC · JPL
626880	2008 AT_{32}	—	December 19, 2007	Mount Lemmon	Mount Lemmon Survey	·	1.1 km	MPC · JPL
626881	2008 AG_{36}	—	January 10, 2008	Kitt Peak	Spacewatch	·	470 m	MPC · JPL
626882	2008 AD_{38}	—	January 10, 2008	Mount Lemmon	Mount Lemmon Survey	·	2.2 km	MPC · JPL
626883	2008 AM_{38}	—	May 21, 2005	Palomar	NEAT	·	970 m	MPC · JPL
626884	2008 AH_{39}	—	December 30, 2007	Kitt Peak	Spacewatch	·	690 m	MPC · JPL
626885	2008 AZ_{42}	—	January 10, 2008	Mount Lemmon	Mount Lemmon Survey	·	1.2 km	MPC · JPL
626886	2008 AL_{51}	—	January 1, 2008	Kitt Peak	Spacewatch	(5)	760 m	MPC · JPL
626887	2008 AZ_{51}	—	December 28, 2007	Kitt Peak	Spacewatch	·	1.3 km	MPC · JPL
626888	2008 AO_{62}	—	January 11, 2008	Mount Lemmon	Mount Lemmon Survey	·	480 m	MPC · JPL
626889	2008 AQ_{63}	—	January 11, 2008	Kitt Peak	Spacewatch	·	510 m	MPC · JPL
626890	2008 AE_{65}	—	September 16, 2003	Kitt Peak	Spacewatch	·	530 m	MPC · JPL
626891	2008 AG_{66}	—	December 18, 2007	Mount Lemmon	Mount Lemmon Survey	HNS	950 m	MPC · JPL
626892	2008 AM_{85}	—	December 19, 2007	Mount Lemmon	Mount Lemmon Survey	H	440 m	MPC · JPL
626893	2008 AX_{86}	—	November 3, 2007	Mount Lemmon	Mount Lemmon Survey	·	1.2 km	MPC · JPL
626894	2008 AY_{90}	—	January 13, 2008	Kitt Peak	Spacewatch	·	810 m	MPC · JPL
626895	2008 AG_{94}	—	December 30, 2007	Kitt Peak	Spacewatch	·	1.0 km	MPC · JPL
626896	2008 AS_{102}	—	January 13, 2008	Kitt Peak	Spacewatch	·	1.9 km	MPC · JPL
626897	2008 AT_{108}	—	January 15, 2008	Kitt Peak	Spacewatch	·	1.2 km	MPC · JPL
626898	2008 AQ_{109}	—	January 15, 2008	Kitt Peak	Spacewatch	·	730 m	MPC · JPL
626899	2008 AE_{111}	—	January 15, 2008	Kitt Peak	Spacewatch	·	1.5 km	MPC · JPL
626900	2008 AU_{113}	—	January 1, 2008	Kitt Peak	Spacewatch	·	1.9 km	MPC · JPL

== 626901–627000 ==
back to top

Designation			Discovery			Properties		Ref
Permanent	Provisional	Named after	Date	Site	Discoverer(s)	Category	Diam.	Ref
626901	2008 AX_{131}	—	January 6, 2008	Mauna Kea	P. A. Wiegert, A. M. Gilbert	·	380 m	MPC · JPL
626902	2008 AB_{134}	—	January 14, 2008	Kitt Peak	Spacewatch	·	1.5 km	MPC · JPL
626903	2008 AK_{140}	—	January 1, 2008	Kitt Peak	Spacewatch	·	2.5 km	MPC · JPL
626904	2008 AL_{140}	—	January 1, 2008	Kitt Peak	Spacewatch	·	550 m	MPC · JPL
626905	2008 AC_{141}	—	January 12, 2008	Mount Lemmon	Mount Lemmon Survey	·	800 m	MPC · JPL
626906	2008 AG_{141}	—	May 23, 2012	Mount Lemmon	Mount Lemmon Survey	·	560 m	MPC · JPL
626907	2008 AT_{142}	—	September 18, 2011	Catalina	CSS	·	1.7 km	MPC · JPL
626908	2008 AK_{143}	—	January 15, 2008	Mount Lemmon	Mount Lemmon Survey	·	1.0 km	MPC · JPL
626909	2008 AA_{144}	—	January 11, 2008	Mount Lemmon	Mount Lemmon Survey	·	690 m	MPC · JPL
626910	2008 AV_{144}	—	October 29, 2010	Catalina	CSS	·	550 m	MPC · JPL
626911	2008 AO_{145}	—	October 5, 2012	Mount Lemmon	Mount Lemmon Survey	·	2.5 km	MPC · JPL
626912	2008 AZ_{145}	—	January 28, 2015	Haleakala	Pan-STARRS 1	URS	2.7 km	MPC · JPL
626913	2008 AY_{146}	—	October 27, 2011	Mount Lemmon	Mount Lemmon Survey	·	960 m	MPC · JPL
626914	2008 AZ_{147}	—	October 12, 2010	Mount Lemmon	Mount Lemmon Survey	·	450 m	MPC · JPL
626915	2008 AZ_{151}	—	January 10, 2008	Mount Lemmon	Mount Lemmon Survey	EUN	770 m	MPC · JPL
626916	2008 AJ_{153}	—	January 11, 2008	Kitt Peak	Spacewatch	·	650 m	MPC · JPL
626917	2008 BZ_{3}	—	January 16, 2008	Kitt Peak	Spacewatch	·	1.5 km	MPC · JPL
626918	2008 BZ_{4}	—	December 19, 2007	Mount Lemmon	Mount Lemmon Survey	H	420 m	MPC · JPL
626919	2008 BP_{5}	—	January 16, 2008	Mount Lemmon	Mount Lemmon Survey	JUN	630 m	MPC · JPL
626920	2008 BU_{12}	—	January 18, 2008	Kitt Peak	Spacewatch	·	1.3 km	MPC · JPL
626921	2008 BC_{23}	—	January 31, 2008	Mount Lemmon	Mount Lemmon Survey	JUN	880 m	MPC · JPL
626922	2008 BJ_{23}	—	January 20, 2008	Mount Lemmon	Mount Lemmon Survey	·	1.3 km	MPC · JPL
626923	2008 BQ_{23}	—	January 31, 2008	Mount Lemmon	Mount Lemmon Survey	·	1.2 km	MPC · JPL
626924	2008 BO_{28}	—	January 13, 2008	Kitt Peak	Spacewatch	·	450 m	MPC · JPL
626925	2008 BE_{37}	—	January 31, 2008	Mount Lemmon	Mount Lemmon Survey	·	1.3 km	MPC · JPL
626926	2008 BB_{45}	—	January 31, 2008	Catalina	CSS	H	470 m	MPC · JPL
626927	2008 BV_{52}	—	January 16, 2008	Kitt Peak	Spacewatch	EUN	930 m	MPC · JPL
626928	2008 BP_{56}	—	January 31, 2008	Mount Lemmon	Mount Lemmon Survey	·	1.3 km	MPC · JPL
626929	2008 BZ_{56}	—	January 18, 2008	Mount Lemmon	Mount Lemmon Survey	·	1.2 km	MPC · JPL
626930	2008 BF_{60}	—	January 19, 2008	Mount Lemmon	Mount Lemmon Survey	LIX	2.4 km	MPC · JPL
626931	2008 BM_{60}	—	January 30, 2008	Kitt Peak	Spacewatch	H	440 m	MPC · JPL
626932	2008 CY_{3}	—	November 19, 2007	Mount Lemmon	Mount Lemmon Survey	KON	1.7 km	MPC · JPL
626933	2008 CB_{9}	—	February 2, 2008	Mount Lemmon	Mount Lemmon Survey	(5)	920 m	MPC · JPL
626934	2008 CY_{9}	—	February 2, 2008	Mount Lemmon	Mount Lemmon Survey	(5)	1 km	MPC · JPL
626935	2008 CB_{11}	—	February 3, 2008	Kitt Peak	Spacewatch	·	580 m	MPC · JPL
626936	2008 CP_{30}	—	January 10, 2008	Kitt Peak	Spacewatch	·	1.4 km	MPC · JPL
626937	2008 CD_{31}	—	January 19, 2008	Kitt Peak	Spacewatch	·	1.1 km	MPC · JPL
626938	2008 CV_{33}	—	February 2, 2008	Kitt Peak	Spacewatch	·	470 m	MPC · JPL
626939	2008 CD_{34}	—	February 2, 2008	Kitt Peak	Spacewatch	·	1.1 km	MPC · JPL
626940	2008 CG_{35}	—	January 1, 2008	Mount Lemmon	Mount Lemmon Survey	·	1.2 km	MPC · JPL
626941	2008 CT_{37}	—	February 2, 2008	Kitt Peak	Spacewatch	·	610 m	MPC · JPL
626942	2008 CS_{41}	—	February 2, 2008	Kitt Peak	Spacewatch	·	1.2 km	MPC · JPL
626943	2008 CD_{42}	—	February 2, 2008	Kitt Peak	Spacewatch	·	890 m	MPC · JPL
626944	2008 CR_{46}	—	February 2, 2008	Kitt Peak	Spacewatch	·	830 m	MPC · JPL
626945	2008 CF_{47}	—	February 3, 2008	Kitt Peak	Spacewatch	H	490 m	MPC · JPL
626946	2008 CL_{47}	—	February 3, 2008	Catalina	CSS	(5)	920 m	MPC · JPL
626947	2008 CF_{51}	—	March 13, 2005	Kitt Peak	Spacewatch	·	500 m	MPC · JPL
626948	2008 CV_{52}	—	February 7, 2008	Kitt Peak	Spacewatch	·	1.3 km	MPC · JPL
626949	2008 CR_{55}	—	February 7, 2008	Kitt Peak	Spacewatch	·	930 m	MPC · JPL
626950	2008 CA_{56}	—	February 7, 2008	Kitt Peak	Spacewatch	·	1.1 km	MPC · JPL
626951	2008 CL_{58}	—	January 12, 2008	Mount Lemmon	Mount Lemmon Survey	·	1.3 km	MPC · JPL
626952	2008 CQ_{78}	—	December 30, 2007	Kitt Peak	Spacewatch	·	640 m	MPC · JPL
626953	2008 CO_{79}	—	February 7, 2008	Kitt Peak	Spacewatch	·	1.1 km	MPC · JPL
626954	2008 CW_{100}	—	January 1, 2008	Kitt Peak	Spacewatch	·	1.3 km	MPC · JPL
626955	2008 CQ_{101}	—	February 9, 2008	Mount Lemmon	Mount Lemmon Survey	H	350 m	MPC · JPL
626956	2008 CR_{102}	—	February 9, 2008	Mount Lemmon	Mount Lemmon Survey	·	500 m	MPC · JPL
626957	2008 CK_{104}	—	September 11, 2002	Palomar	NEAT	(5)	1.4 km	MPC · JPL
626958	2008 CL_{110}	—	February 10, 2008	Kitt Peak	Spacewatch	·	650 m	MPC · JPL
626959	2008 CV_{112}	—	February 10, 2008	Kitt Peak	Spacewatch	·	1.6 km	MPC · JPL
626960	2008 CF_{119}	—	February 13, 2008	Kitt Peak	Spacewatch	H	390 m	MPC · JPL
626961	2008 CQ_{121}	—	January 11, 2008	Kitt Peak	Spacewatch	·	1.3 km	MPC · JPL
626962	2008 CP_{126}	—	February 8, 2008	Kitt Peak	Spacewatch	HNS	850 m	MPC · JPL
626963	2008 CG_{129}	—	February 8, 2008	Kitt Peak	Spacewatch	·	1.2 km	MPC · JPL
626964	2008 CJ_{130}	—	March 17, 2005	Mount Lemmon	Mount Lemmon Survey	·	690 m	MPC · JPL
626965	2008 CU_{130}	—	February 8, 2008	Kitt Peak	Spacewatch	MAS	590 m	MPC · JPL
626966	2008 CP_{138}	—	February 8, 2008	Kitt Peak	Spacewatch	·	1.1 km	MPC · JPL
626967	2008 CY_{140}	—	February 8, 2008	Mount Lemmon	Mount Lemmon Survey	·	1.6 km	MPC · JPL
626968	2008 CJ_{150}	—	September 15, 2006	Kitt Peak	Spacewatch	·	1.1 km	MPC · JPL
626969	2008 CN_{151}	—	February 9, 2008	Kitt Peak	Spacewatch	·	610 m	MPC · JPL
626970	2008 CU_{159}	—	January 30, 2008	Mount Lemmon	Mount Lemmon Survey	·	590 m	MPC · JPL
626971	2008 CB_{163}	—	January 30, 2008	Mount Lemmon	Mount Lemmon Survey	·	890 m	MPC · JPL
626972	2008 CK_{173}	—	February 13, 2008	Kitt Peak	Spacewatch	·	1.0 km	MPC · JPL
626973	2008 CH_{177}	—	February 14, 2008	Catalina	CSS	·	1.3 km	MPC · JPL
626974	2008 CA_{191}	—	February 2, 2008	Kitt Peak	Spacewatch	MIS	2.0 km	MPC · JPL
626975	2008 CA_{204}	—	February 13, 2008	Mount Lemmon	Mount Lemmon Survey	·	2.2 km	MPC · JPL
626976	2008 CG_{214}	—	April 15, 2001	Kitt Peak	Spacewatch	·	810 m	MPC · JPL
626977	2008 CF_{224}	—	February 11, 2008	Mount Lemmon	Mount Lemmon Survey	·	500 m	MPC · JPL
626978	2008 CS_{224}	—	September 28, 2013	Mount Lemmon	Mount Lemmon Survey	·	650 m	MPC · JPL
626979	2008 CP_{225}	—	January 25, 2012	Haleakala	Pan-STARRS 1	HNS	830 m	MPC · JPL
626980	2008 CX_{226}	—	March 26, 2015	Mount Lemmon	Mount Lemmon Survey	·	590 m	MPC · JPL
626981	2008 CQ_{227}	—	October 12, 2015	Mount Lemmon	Mount Lemmon Survey	HNS	900 m	MPC · JPL
626982	2008 CA_{229}	—	December 26, 2011	Kitt Peak	Spacewatch	·	1.3 km	MPC · JPL
626983	2008 CE_{229}	—	January 27, 2017	Haleakala	Pan-STARRS 1	EUN	820 m	MPC · JPL
626984	2008 CH_{229}	—	March 7, 2014	Catalina	CSS	·	2.2 km	MPC · JPL
626985	2008 CJ_{229}	—	September 26, 2017	Haleakala	Pan-STARRS 1	·	2.1 km	MPC · JPL
626986	2008 CL_{229}	—	November 13, 2007	Mount Lemmon	Mount Lemmon Survey	·	3.5 km	MPC · JPL
626987	2008 CZ_{232}	—	May 23, 2014	Haleakala	Pan-STARRS 1	·	1.4 km	MPC · JPL
626988	2008 CD_{233}	—	February 8, 2008	Kitt Peak	Spacewatch	JUN	790 m	MPC · JPL
626989	2008 CB_{236}	—	February 11, 2008	Kitt Peak	Spacewatch	·	670 m	MPC · JPL
626990	2008 CT_{238}	—	February 12, 2008	Mount Lemmon	Mount Lemmon Survey	·	1.6 km	MPC · JPL
626991	2008 CM_{240}	—	February 11, 2008	Mount Lemmon	Mount Lemmon Survey	·	880 m	MPC · JPL
626992	2008 CO_{242}	—	February 13, 2008	Kitt Peak	Spacewatch	·	460 m	MPC · JPL
626993	2008 DW_{1}	—	December 31, 2007	Kitt Peak	Spacewatch	·	850 m	MPC · JPL
626994	2008 DE_{9}	—	February 25, 2008	Kitt Peak	Spacewatch	·	560 m	MPC · JPL
626995	2008 DP_{12}	—	January 10, 2008	Kitt Peak	Spacewatch	·	990 m	MPC · JPL
626996	2008 DQ_{18}	—	May 20, 2005	Mount Lemmon	Mount Lemmon Survey	·	600 m	MPC · JPL
626997	2008 DV_{18}	—	January 11, 2008	Kitt Peak	Spacewatch	·	1.5 km	MPC · JPL
626998	2008 DA_{33}	—	February 10, 2008	Kitt Peak	Spacewatch	·	1.5 km	MPC · JPL
626999	2008 DZ_{33}	—	February 27, 2008	Mount Lemmon	Mount Lemmon Survey	H	440 m	MPC · JPL
627000	2008 DQ_{62}	—	February 28, 2008	Mount Lemmon	Mount Lemmon Survey	·	540 m	MPC · JPL

back to top
