= List of minor planets: 714001–715000 =

The following is a partial list of minor planets, running from minor-planet number 714001 through 715000, inclusive. The primary data for this and other partial lists is based on JPL's "Small-Body Orbital Elements" and data available from the Minor Planet Center. Critical list information is also provided by the MPC, unless otherwise specified from Lowell Observatory. A detailed description of the table's columns and additional sources are given on the main page including a complete list of every page in this series, and a statistical break-up on the dynamical classification of minor planets.

Also see the summary list of all named bodies in numerical and alphabetical order, and the corresponding naming citations for the number range of this particular list. New namings may only be added to this list after official publication, as the preannouncement of names is condemned by the Working Group for Small Bodies Nomenclature of the International Astronomical Union.

Near-Earth obj.	MBA (inner)	MBA (outer)	Centaur
Mars-crosser	MBA (middle)	Jupiter trojan	Trans-Neptunian obj.
Unclassified

== 714001–714100 ==
Designation			Discovery			Properties		Ref
Permanent	Provisional	Named after	Date	Site	Discoverer(s)	Category	Diam.	Ref
714001	2015 HQ_{132}	—	September 28, 2008	Mount Lemmon	Mount Lemmon Survey	·	1.3 km	MPC · JPL
714002	2015 HR_{132}	—	October 11, 2012	Haleakala	Pan-STARRS 1	·	1.2 km	MPC · JPL
714003	2015 HT_{134}	—	February 9, 2007	Kitt Peak	Spacewatch	MAS	630 m	MPC · JPL
714004	2015 HQ_{135}	—	October 18, 2012	Haleakala	Pan-STARRS 1	EOS	1.2 km	MPC · JPL
714005	2015 HC_{136}	—	April 23, 2015	Haleakala	Pan-STARRS 1	·	1.4 km	MPC · JPL
714006	2015 HR_{137}	—	April 18, 2015	Kitt Peak	Spacewatch	·	1.1 km	MPC · JPL
714007	2015 HH_{142}	—	October 28, 2008	Mount Lemmon	Mount Lemmon Survey	·	870 m	MPC · JPL
714008	2015 HB_{144}	—	May 26, 2011	Nogales	M. Schwartz, P. R. Holvorcem	·	1.1 km	MPC · JPL
714009	2015 HV_{144}	—	December 11, 2013	Haleakala	Pan-STARRS 1	·	900 m	MPC · JPL
714010	2015 HO_{146}	—	January 30, 2006	Kitt Peak	Spacewatch	·	1.1 km	MPC · JPL
714011	2015 HL_{147}	—	September 25, 2008	Kitt Peak	Spacewatch	·	860 m	MPC · JPL
714012	2015 HB_{150}	—	April 23, 2015	Haleakala	Pan-STARRS 1	·	990 m	MPC · JPL
714013	2015 HP_{150}	—	December 5, 2007	Kitt Peak	Spacewatch	HYG	2.3 km	MPC · JPL
714014	2015 HH_{151}	—	May 22, 2011	Nogales	M. Schwartz, P. R. Holvorcem	·	1.0 km	MPC · JPL
714015	2015 HN_{151}	—	February 1, 2011	Piszkés-tető	K. Sárneczky, Z. Kuli	·	900 m	MPC · JPL
714016	2015 HW_{151}	—	September 17, 2012	Mount Lemmon	Mount Lemmon Survey	·	1.1 km	MPC · JPL
714017	2015 HY_{151}	—	March 10, 2002	Kitt Peak	Spacewatch	·	980 m	MPC · JPL
714018	2015 HW_{154}	—	November 1, 2008	Mount Lemmon	Mount Lemmon Survey	EUN	930 m	MPC · JPL
714019	2015 HT_{158}	—	April 24, 2015	Haleakala	Pan-STARRS 1	·	970 m	MPC · JPL
714020	2015 HR_{159}	—	April 24, 2015	Haleakala	Pan-STARRS 1	·	820 m	MPC · JPL
714021	2015 HR_{162}	—	February 21, 2007	Mount Lemmon	Mount Lemmon Survey	MAS	650 m	MPC · JPL
714022	2015 HX_{162}	—	April 29, 2011	Mount Lemmon	Mount Lemmon Survey	·	750 m	MPC · JPL
714023	2015 HF_{163}	—	January 28, 2011	Mount Lemmon	Mount Lemmon Survey	·	680 m	MPC · JPL
714024	2015 HG_{163}	—	March 9, 2011	Mount Lemmon	Mount Lemmon Survey	·	910 m	MPC · JPL
714025	2015 HW_{164}	—	March 24, 2015	Mount Lemmon	Mount Lemmon Survey	·	1.1 km	MPC · JPL
714026	2015 HC_{165}	—	April 24, 2015	Haleakala	Pan-STARRS 1	·	960 m	MPC · JPL
714027	2015 HD_{166}	—	October 12, 2005	Kitt Peak	Spacewatch	·	820 m	MPC · JPL
714028	2015 HT_{167}	—	April 24, 2015	Haleakala	Pan-STARRS 1	·	530 m	MPC · JPL
714029	2015 HU_{167}	—	April 17, 2015	Mount Lemmon	Mount Lemmon Survey	JUN	830 m	MPC · JPL
714030	2015 HS_{172}	—	February 8, 2002	Kitt Peak	Spacewatch	·	1.2 km	MPC · JPL
714031	2015 HH_{175}	—	April 10, 2000	Kitt Peak	Spacewatch	NYS	920 m	MPC · JPL
714032	2015 HE_{176}	—	May 10, 2002	Palomar	NEAT	·	1.7 km	MPC · JPL
714033	2015 HC_{177}	—	March 27, 2015	Catalina	CSS	H	470 m	MPC · JPL
714034	2015 HH_{177}	—	December 25, 2013	Mount Lemmon	Mount Lemmon Survey	·	2.3 km	MPC · JPL
714035	2015 HR_{177}	—	January 25, 2007	Kitt Peak	Spacewatch	NYS	1.0 km	MPC · JPL
714036	2015 HB_{178}	—	April 18, 2005	Kitt Peak	Spacewatch	·	690 m	MPC · JPL
714037	2015 HK_{180}	—	March 29, 2011	Mount Lemmon	Mount Lemmon Survey	·	1.2 km	MPC · JPL
714038	2015 HS_{183}	—	November 26, 2013	Catalina	CSS	·	1.0 km	MPC · JPL
714039	2015 HV_{183}	—	April 20, 2012	Catalina	CSS	H	560 m	MPC · JPL
714040	2015 HH_{187}	—	April 20, 2015	Haleakala	Pan-STARRS 1	MAR	980 m	MPC · JPL
714041	2015 HJ_{187}	—	November 30, 2008	Mount Lemmon	Mount Lemmon Survey	·	1.1 km	MPC · JPL
714042	2015 HC_{188}	—	December 22, 2008	Kitt Peak	Spacewatch	·	1.6 km	MPC · JPL
714043	2015 HZ_{188}	—	April 18, 2015	Haleakala	Pan-STARRS 1	·	1.3 km	MPC · JPL
714044	2015 HD_{189}	—	April 18, 2015	Haleakala	Pan-STARRS 1	·	1.5 km	MPC · JPL
714045	2015 HJ_{190}	—	December 24, 2013	Mount Lemmon	Mount Lemmon Survey	MAR	1.0 km	MPC · JPL
714046	2015 HF_{191}	—	April 23, 2015	Haleakala	Pan-STARRS 1	·	960 m	MPC · JPL
714047	2015 HB_{193}	—	April 25, 2015	Haleakala	Pan-STARRS 1	·	920 m	MPC · JPL
714048	2015 HM_{194}	—	April 25, 2015	Haleakala	Pan-STARRS 1	·	1.1 km	MPC · JPL
714049	2015 HB_{208}	—	April 25, 2015	Haleakala	Pan-STARRS 1	·	860 m	MPC · JPL
714050	2015 HE_{208}	—	April 24, 2015	Haleakala	Pan-STARRS 1	·	1.4 km	MPC · JPL
714051	2015 HC_{210}	—	April 25, 2015	Haleakala	Pan-STARRS 1	·	1.0 km	MPC · JPL
714052	2015 HF_{210}	—	April 25, 2015	Haleakala	Pan-STARRS 1	·	1.2 km	MPC · JPL
714053	2015 HK_{211}	—	April 23, 2015	Haleakala	Pan-STARRS 1	·	890 m	MPC · JPL
714054	2015 HV_{211}	—	April 25, 2015	Haleakala	Pan-STARRS 1	AGN	1.0 km	MPC · JPL
714055	2015 HU_{212}	—	April 23, 2015	Haleakala	Pan-STARRS 1	(5)	970 m	MPC · JPL
714056	2015 HA_{213}	—	April 24, 2015	Haleakala	Pan-STARRS 1	·	950 m	MPC · JPL
714057	2015 HJ_{213}	—	June 15, 2007	Kitt Peak	Spacewatch	·	1.2 km	MPC · JPL
714058	2015 HO_{213}	—	April 23, 2015	Haleakala	Pan-STARRS 1	·	1.4 km	MPC · JPL
714059	2015 HM_{215}	—	April 25, 2015	Haleakala	Pan-STARRS 1	·	1.5 km	MPC · JPL
714060	2015 HH_{217}	—	April 24, 2015	Haleakala	Pan-STARRS 1	·	1.0 km	MPC · JPL
714061	2015 HU_{217}	—	April 23, 2015	Haleakala	Pan-STARRS 1	KOR	1.1 km	MPC · JPL
714062	2015 HE_{219}	—	April 20, 2015	Haleakala	Pan-STARRS 1	·	870 m	MPC · JPL
714063	2015 HP_{221}	—	April 23, 2015	Haleakala	Pan-STARRS 1	·	1.2 km	MPC · JPL
714064	2015 HZ_{222}	—	April 24, 2015	Haleakala	Pan-STARRS 1	·	1.6 km	MPC · JPL
714065	2015 HO_{223}	—	April 23, 2015	Haleakala	Pan-STARRS 1	L4	6.7 km	MPC · JPL
714066	2015 HP_{223}	—	April 24, 2015	Haleakala	Pan-STARRS 1	·	1.3 km	MPC · JPL
714067	2015 HX_{224}	—	October 28, 2008	Mount Lemmon	Mount Lemmon Survey	·	1.2 km	MPC · JPL
714068	2015 HF_{225}	—	April 23, 2015	Haleakala	Pan-STARRS 1	·	1.3 km	MPC · JPL
714069	2015 HM_{225}	—	April 23, 2015	Haleakala	Pan-STARRS 1	KOR	980 m	MPC · JPL
714070	2015 HT_{225}	—	April 20, 2015	Haleakala	Pan-STARRS 1	EUN	790 m	MPC · JPL
714071	2015 HW_{225}	—	April 23, 2015	Haleakala	Pan-STARRS 1	·	1.2 km	MPC · JPL
714072	2015 HB_{226}	—	April 17, 2015	Mount Lemmon	Mount Lemmon Survey	·	910 m	MPC · JPL
714073	2015 HP_{227}	—	April 25, 2015	Cerro Tololo	DECam	L4	6.1 km	MPC · JPL
714074	2015 HE_{228}	—	September 12, 2007	Mount Lemmon	Mount Lemmon Survey	·	1.4 km	MPC · JPL
714075	2015 HY_{232}	—	April 25, 2015	Haleakala	Pan-STARRS 1	·	1.2 km	MPC · JPL
714076	2015 HY_{287}	—	April 18, 2015	Cerro Tololo	DECam	·	2.3 km	MPC · JPL
714077	2015 HY_{305}	—	April 19, 2015	Cerro Tololo	DECam	L4	5.4 km	MPC · JPL
714078	2015 HD_{309}	—	April 18, 2015	Cerro Tololo	DECam	·	430 m	MPC · JPL
714079	2015 HU_{341}	—	April 25, 2015	Haleakala	Pan-STARRS 1	(5)	820 m	MPC · JPL
714080	2015 HH_{359}	—	April 19, 2015	Cerro Tololo	DECam	AGN	780 m	MPC · JPL
714081	2015 JJ_{4}	—	October 26, 2012	Haleakala	Pan-STARRS 1	·	3.4 km	MPC · JPL
714082	2015 JB_{5}	—	May 15, 2015	Haleakala	Pan-STARRS 1	·	1.6 km	MPC · JPL
714083	2015 JO_{5}	—	October 16, 2007	Catalina	CSS	·	1.8 km	MPC · JPL
714084	2015 JG_{6}	—	April 20, 2015	Haleakala	Pan-STARRS 1	·	2.4 km	MPC · JPL
714085	2015 JA_{7}	—	January 7, 2006	Mount Lemmon	Mount Lemmon Survey	·	1.2 km	MPC · JPL
714086	2015 JP_{9}	—	May 24, 2011	Haleakala	Pan-STARRS 1	·	780 m	MPC · JPL
714087	2015 JR_{10}	—	November 25, 2010	Mount Lemmon	Mount Lemmon Survey	3:2	4.7 km	MPC · JPL
714088	2015 JH_{12}	—	May 9, 2015	Mount Lemmon	Mount Lemmon Survey	EUN	810 m	MPC · JPL
714089	2015 JA_{13}	—	November 21, 2008	Mount Lemmon	Mount Lemmon Survey	·	1.7 km	MPC · JPL
714090	2015 JZ_{13}	—	July 2, 2008	Kitt Peak	Spacewatch	·	1.2 km	MPC · JPL
714091	2015 JH_{14}	—	May 15, 2015	Haleakala	Pan-STARRS 1	·	2.9 km	MPC · JPL
714092	2015 JC_{15}	—	November 4, 2012	Mount Lemmon	Mount Lemmon Survey	·	1.0 km	MPC · JPL
714093	2015 JE_{15}	—	November 27, 2013	Haleakala	Pan-STARRS 1	·	1.1 km	MPC · JPL
714094	2015 JW_{15}	—	July 2, 2011	Mount Lemmon	Mount Lemmon Survey	·	1.3 km	MPC · JPL
714095	2015 JU_{16}	—	October 25, 2003	Kitt Peak	Spacewatch	·	1.1 km	MPC · JPL
714096	2015 JY_{16}	—	May 14, 2015	Haleakala	Pan-STARRS 1	·	1.2 km	MPC · JPL
714097	2015 JW_{20}	—	May 14, 2015	Haleakala	Pan-STARRS 1	·	1.5 km	MPC · JPL
714098	2015 JN_{21}	—	November 12, 2012	Mount Lemmon	Mount Lemmon Survey	·	990 m	MPC · JPL
714099	2015 JR_{23}	—	May 7, 2015	Mount Lemmon	Mount Lemmon Survey	·	870 m	MPC · JPL
714100	2015 JQ_{25}	—	May 15, 2015	Haleakala	Pan-STARRS 1	·	1.5 km	MPC · JPL

== 714101–714200 ==
back to top

Designation			Discovery			Properties		Ref
Permanent	Provisional	Named after	Date	Site	Discoverer(s)	Category	Diam.	Ref
714101	2015 KA_{1}	—	November 28, 2013	Mount Lemmon	Mount Lemmon Survey	·	1.4 km	MPC · JPL
714102	2015 KO_{3}	—	March 25, 2015	Mount Lemmon	Mount Lemmon Survey	MAR	930 m	MPC · JPL
714103	2015 KU_{3}	—	October 22, 2012	Haleakala	Pan-STARRS 1	·	1.1 km	MPC · JPL
714104	2015 KG_{4}	—	May 18, 2015	Haleakala	Pan-STARRS 1	·	1.2 km	MPC · JPL
714105	2015 KK_{6}	—	May 18, 2015	Mount Lemmon	Mount Lemmon Survey	·	1.1 km	MPC · JPL
714106	2015 KS_{7}	—	March 3, 2006	Kitt Peak	Spacewatch	·	1.0 km	MPC · JPL
714107	2015 KT_{7}	—	February 5, 2011	Catalina	CSS	·	870 m	MPC · JPL
714108	2015 KB_{9}	—	May 18, 2015	Haleakala	Pan-STARRS 1	EOS	1.4 km	MPC · JPL
714109	2015 KG_{10}	—	May 14, 2015	Haleakala	Pan-STARRS 1	·	1.4 km	MPC · JPL
714110	2015 KQ_{10}	—	December 26, 2013	Mount Lemmon	Mount Lemmon Survey	EUN	1.4 km	MPC · JPL
714111	2015 KU_{11}	—	October 30, 2009	Mount Lemmon	Mount Lemmon Survey	·	1.3 km	MPC · JPL
714112	2015 KT_{12}	—	May 1, 2011	Haleakala	Pan-STARRS 1	PHO	820 m	MPC · JPL
714113	2015 KL_{14}	—	November 14, 2012	Mount Lemmon	Mount Lemmon Survey	·	3.0 km	MPC · JPL
714114	2015 KP_{15}	—	August 21, 2011	Haleakala	Pan-STARRS 1	·	1.3 km	MPC · JPL
714115	2015 KE_{16}	—	March 28, 2015	Haleakala	Pan-STARRS 1	·	1.2 km	MPC · JPL
714116	2015 KS_{17}	—	April 25, 2015	Haleakala	Pan-STARRS 1	EUN	930 m	MPC · JPL
714117	2015 KN_{19}	—	February 27, 2015	Haleakala	Pan-STARRS 1	·	1.7 km	MPC · JPL
714118	2015 KT_{19}	—	May 18, 2015	Haleakala	Pan-STARRS 2	MIS	2.1 km	MPC · JPL
714119	2015 KG_{20}	—	May 15, 2015	Haleakala	Pan-STARRS 1	·	1.0 km	MPC · JPL
714120	2015 KM_{20}	—	March 21, 2015	Haleakala	Pan-STARRS 1	·	1.0 km	MPC · JPL
714121	2015 KZ_{20}	—	November 6, 2013	Haleakala	Pan-STARRS 1	·	1.5 km	MPC · JPL
714122	2015 KR_{21}	—	March 6, 2008	Mount Lemmon	Mount Lemmon Survey	·	770 m	MPC · JPL
714123	2015 KP_{26}	—	September 20, 2011	Mount Lemmon	Mount Lemmon Survey	·	1.6 km	MPC · JPL
714124	2015 KV_{28}	—	April 18, 2015	Haleakala	Pan-STARRS 1	·	1.7 km	MPC · JPL
714125	2015 KZ_{29}	—	October 1, 2008	Mount Lemmon	Mount Lemmon Survey	·	840 m	MPC · JPL
714126	2015 KC_{30}	—	January 10, 2014	Mount Lemmon	Mount Lemmon Survey	·	1.2 km	MPC · JPL
714127	2015 KP_{33}	—	December 2, 2005	Kitt Peak	Spacewatch	·	890 m	MPC · JPL
714128	2015 KS_{33}	—	September 25, 2003	Palomar	NEAT	·	1.1 km	MPC · JPL
714129	2015 KJ_{34}	—	April 24, 2015	Haleakala	Pan-STARRS 1	·	1.7 km	MPC · JPL
714130	2015 KO_{34}	—	April 23, 2015	Haleakala	Pan-STARRS 1	(5)	1.1 km	MPC · JPL
714131	2015 KY_{34}	—	May 12, 2015	Mount Lemmon	Mount Lemmon Survey	·	510 m	MPC · JPL
714132	2015 KU_{35}	—	April 25, 2006	Kitt Peak	Spacewatch	·	1.4 km	MPC · JPL
714133	2015 KC_{37}	—	April 29, 2006	Kitt Peak	Spacewatch	·	1.4 km	MPC · JPL
714134	2015 KG_{39}	—	May 13, 2015	Cerro Paranal	Altmann, M., Prusti, T.	NYS	760 m	MPC · JPL
714135	2015 KV_{42}	—	October 21, 2003	Kitt Peak	Spacewatch	MIS	2.0 km	MPC · JPL
714136	2015 KC_{46}	—	November 19, 2008	Mount Lemmon	Mount Lemmon Survey	·	1.7 km	MPC · JPL
714137	2015 KW_{50}	—	September 3, 2000	Apache Point	SDSS	3:2	4.0 km	MPC · JPL
714138	2015 KX_{50}	—	November 20, 2008	Kitt Peak	Spacewatch	·	1.5 km	MPC · JPL
714139	2015 KY_{55}	—	October 29, 2003	Kitt Peak	Spacewatch	MIS	2.2 km	MPC · JPL
714140	2015 KZ_{58}	—	March 5, 2011	Kitt Peak	Spacewatch	·	1.1 km	MPC · JPL
714141	2015 KF_{59}	—	December 29, 2013	Catalina	CSS	HNS	900 m	MPC · JPL
714142	2015 KH_{62}	—	May 31, 2011	Kitt Peak	Spacewatch	KON	2.2 km	MPC · JPL
714143	2015 KT_{62}	—	March 28, 2015	Haleakala	Pan-STARRS 1	·	1.3 km	MPC · JPL
714144	2015 KR_{65}	—	September 25, 2006	Kitt Peak	Spacewatch	·	2.1 km	MPC · JPL
714145	2015 KN_{66}	—	October 9, 1996	Kitt Peak	Spacewatch	·	600 m	MPC · JPL
714146	2015 KQ_{69}	—	November 28, 2013	Kitt Peak	Spacewatch	·	1.5 km	MPC · JPL
714147	2015 KF_{70}	—	February 6, 2014	Mount Lemmon	Mount Lemmon Survey	EOS	1.3 km	MPC · JPL
714148	2015 KB_{71}	—	April 19, 2015	Kitt Peak	Spacewatch	EUN	870 m	MPC · JPL
714149	2015 KZ_{72}	—	September 30, 2006	Mount Lemmon	Mount Lemmon Survey	·	2.5 km	MPC · JPL
714150	2015 KB_{74}	—	May 18, 2015	Mount Lemmon	Mount Lemmon Survey	·	1.2 km	MPC · JPL
714151	2015 KF_{74}	—	August 25, 2012	Haleakala	Pan-STARRS 1	·	1.2 km	MPC · JPL
714152	2015 KC_{75}	—	October 20, 2012	Mount Lemmon	Mount Lemmon Survey	·	1.8 km	MPC · JPL
714153	2015 KG_{77}	—	June 25, 2011	Kitt Peak	Spacewatch	·	1.5 km	MPC · JPL
714154	2015 KB_{79}	—	May 21, 2015	Haleakala	Pan-STARRS 1	KON	1.8 km	MPC · JPL
714155	2015 KF_{80}	—	September 23, 2011	Haleakala	Pan-STARRS 1	·	2.5 km	MPC · JPL
714156	2015 KB_{82}	—	May 21, 2015	Haleakala	Pan-STARRS 1	·	1.3 km	MPC · JPL
714157	2015 KA_{86}	—	January 22, 2015	Haleakala	Pan-STARRS 1	·	1.3 km	MPC · JPL
714158	2015 KN_{86}	—	February 20, 2014	Mount Lemmon	Mount Lemmon Survey	·	1.2 km	MPC · JPL
714159	2015 KX_{86}	—	May 21, 2015	Haleakala	Pan-STARRS 1	KON	1.9 km	MPC · JPL
714160	2015 KM_{87}	—	May 21, 2015	Haleakala	Pan-STARRS 1	·	1.4 km	MPC · JPL
714161	2015 KQ_{87}	—	May 21, 2015	Haleakala	Pan-STARRS 1	MAR	820 m	MPC · JPL
714162	2015 KB_{90}	—	May 21, 2015	Haleakala	Pan-STARRS 1	EOS	1.3 km	MPC · JPL
714163	2015 KY_{90}	—	May 21, 2015	Haleakala	Pan-STARRS 1	·	540 m	MPC · JPL
714164	2015 KE_{92}	—	June 27, 2011	Mount Lemmon	Mount Lemmon Survey	·	1.1 km	MPC · JPL
714165	2015 KM_{92}	—	October 20, 2012	Haleakala	Pan-STARRS 1	EUN	950 m	MPC · JPL
714166	2015 KA_{95}	—	February 17, 2010	Kitt Peak	Spacewatch	·	1.4 km	MPC · JPL
714167	2015 KT_{96}	—	January 28, 2014	Kitt Peak	Spacewatch	·	1.1 km	MPC · JPL
714168	2015 KO_{105}	—	February 17, 2010	Mount Lemmon	Mount Lemmon Survey	·	1.2 km	MPC · JPL
714169	2015 KQ_{105}	—	May 21, 2015	Haleakala	Pan-STARRS 1	·	1.5 km	MPC · JPL
714170	2015 KL_{107}	—	May 21, 2015	Haleakala	Pan-STARRS 1	EOS	1.2 km	MPC · JPL
714171	2015 KT_{107}	—	May 21, 2015	Haleakala	Pan-STARRS 1	·	1.4 km	MPC · JPL
714172	2015 KH_{108}	—	September 26, 2003	Apache Point	SDSS Collaboration	·	1.3 km	MPC · JPL
714173	2015 KW_{108}	—	December 4, 2012	Mount Lemmon	Mount Lemmon Survey	PAD	1.2 km	MPC · JPL
714174	2015 KY_{109}	—	May 21, 2015	Haleakala	Pan-STARRS 1	GEF	730 m	MPC · JPL
714175	2015 KY_{110}	—	May 21, 2015	Haleakala	Pan-STARRS 1	·	1.4 km	MPC · JPL
714176	2015 KK_{113}	—	October 11, 2012	Haleakala	Pan-STARRS 1	·	1.4 km	MPC · JPL
714177	2015 KN_{115}	—	May 21, 2015	Haleakala	Pan-STARRS 1	3:2	3.8 km	MPC · JPL
714178	2015 KZ_{115}	—	March 24, 2003	Kitt Peak	Spacewatch	·	1.2 km	MPC · JPL
714179	2015 KA_{116}	—	April 23, 2015	Haleakala	Pan-STARRS 1	·	1.3 km	MPC · JPL
714180	2015 KF_{116}	—	February 28, 2014	Haleakala	Pan-STARRS 1	·	1.3 km	MPC · JPL
714181	2015 KH_{116}	—	September 15, 2012	Catalina	CSS	·	1.3 km	MPC · JPL
714182	2015 KH_{117}	—	May 21, 2015	Haleakala	Pan-STARRS 1	EOS	1.4 km	MPC · JPL
714183	2015 KP_{118}	—	May 22, 2015	Haleakala	Pan-STARRS 1	EUN	1.1 km	MPC · JPL
714184	2015 KJ_{119}	—	March 28, 2015	Haleakala	Pan-STARRS 1	·	1.1 km	MPC · JPL
714185	2015 KX_{123}	—	July 9, 2003	Kitt Peak	Spacewatch	·	1.1 km	MPC · JPL
714186	2015 KH_{125}	—	March 28, 2015	Haleakala	Pan-STARRS 1	HNS	850 m	MPC · JPL
714187	2015 KA_{129}	—	April 25, 2015	Haleakala	Pan-STARRS 1	·	1.2 km	MPC · JPL
714188	2015 KJ_{130}	—	April 30, 2006	Kitt Peak	Spacewatch	·	1.6 km	MPC · JPL
714189	2015 KN_{132}	—	August 30, 2006	Anderson Mesa	LONEOS	·	1.9 km	MPC · JPL
714190	2015 KN_{133}	—	May 14, 2015	Haleakala	Pan-STARRS 1	EUN	1.0 km	MPC · JPL
714191	2015 KC_{135}	—	October 18, 2003	Apache Point	SDSS Collaboration	EUN	1.0 km	MPC · JPL
714192	2015 KF_{136}	—	April 26, 2007	Kitt Peak	Spacewatch	3:2	5.2 km	MPC · JPL
714193	2015 KJ_{136}	—	September 13, 2007	Mount Lemmon	Mount Lemmon Survey	·	1.4 km	MPC · JPL
714194	2015 KP_{137}	—	July 29, 2008	Mount Lemmon	Mount Lemmon Survey	·	1.2 km	MPC · JPL
714195	2015 KF_{138}	—	October 15, 2009	Mount Lemmon	Mount Lemmon Survey	3:2 · SHU	4.7 km	MPC · JPL
714196	2015 KD_{140}	—	November 1, 2008	Mount Lemmon	Mount Lemmon Survey	·	1.3 km	MPC · JPL
714197	2015 KP_{141}	—	May 24, 2015	Haleakala	Pan-STARRS 1	·	1.1 km	MPC · JPL
714198	2015 KF_{142}	—	September 28, 2011	Mount Lemmon	Mount Lemmon Survey	HYG	2.3 km	MPC · JPL
714199	2015 KS_{142}	—	February 28, 2008	Kitt Peak	Spacewatch	·	610 m	MPC · JPL
714200	2015 KL_{143}	—	November 22, 2012	Kitt Peak	Spacewatch	·	3.1 km	MPC · JPL

== 714201–714300 ==
back to top

Designation			Discovery			Properties		Ref
Permanent	Provisional	Named after	Date	Site	Discoverer(s)	Category	Diam.	Ref
714201	2015 KG_{144}	—	September 28, 2009	Mount Lemmon	Mount Lemmon Survey	·	770 m	MPC · JPL
714202	2015 KL_{144}	—	November 19, 2012	Kitt Peak	Spacewatch	·	1.3 km	MPC · JPL
714203	2015 KX_{147}	—	May 24, 2015	Haleakala	Pan-STARRS 1	EUN	1.2 km	MPC · JPL
714204	2015 KB_{149}	—	October 21, 2011	Mount Lemmon	Mount Lemmon Survey	·	1.8 km	MPC · JPL
714205	2015 KQ_{149}	—	May 21, 2011	Mount Lemmon	Mount Lemmon Survey	KON	1.7 km	MPC · JPL
714206	2015 KS_{150}	—	February 25, 2006	Kitt Peak	Spacewatch	·	1.3 km	MPC · JPL
714207	2015 KF_{151}	—	June 1, 2011	ESA OGS	ESA OGS	MAR	800 m	MPC · JPL
714208	2015 KE_{161}	—	November 18, 2000	Kitt Peak	Spacewatch	HNS	960 m	MPC · JPL
714209	2015 KA_{166}	—	May 21, 2015	Haleakala	Pan-STARRS 1	·	1.8 km	MPC · JPL
714210	2015 KE_{166}	—	November 13, 2006	Catalina	CSS	DOR	2.2 km	MPC · JPL
714211	2015 KV_{166}	—	May 21, 2015	Haleakala	Pan-STARRS 1	·	1.0 km	MPC · JPL
714212	2015 KZ_{166}	—	January 3, 2009	Kitt Peak	Spacewatch	·	1.6 km	MPC · JPL
714213	2015 KP_{167}	—	May 18, 2015	Mount Lemmon	Mount Lemmon Survey	·	1.3 km	MPC · JPL
714214	2015 KR_{168}	—	May 18, 2015	Mount Lemmon	Mount Lemmon Survey	·	1.6 km	MPC · JPL
714215	2015 KS_{168}	—	January 24, 2014	Haleakala	Pan-STARRS 1	V	620 m	MPC · JPL
714216	2015 KC_{170}	—	May 21, 2015	Haleakala	Pan-STARRS 1	·	1.1 km	MPC · JPL
714217	2015 KM_{170}	—	May 21, 2015	Haleakala	Pan-STARRS 1	·	2.0 km	MPC · JPL
714218	2015 KL_{172}	—	May 20, 2015	Haleakala	Pan-STARRS 1	V	670 m	MPC · JPL
714219	2015 KB_{179}	—	May 18, 2015	Haleakala	Pan-STARRS 2	·	1.6 km	MPC · JPL
714220	2015 KW_{186}	—	May 20, 2015	Haleakala	Pan-STARRS 1	·	930 m	MPC · JPL
714221	2015 KJ_{187}	—	May 22, 2015	Haleakala	Pan-STARRS 1	·	1.5 km	MPC · JPL
714222	2015 KD_{188}	—	May 21, 2015	Haleakala	Pan-STARRS 1	·	1.2 km	MPC · JPL
714223	2015 KE_{188}	—	May 21, 2015	Haleakala	Pan-STARRS 1	·	1.2 km	MPC · JPL
714224	2015 KG_{189}	—	May 21, 2015	Haleakala	Pan-STARRS 1	·	960 m	MPC · JPL
714225	2015 KO_{191}	—	May 18, 2015	Haleakala	Pan-STARRS 1	·	1.2 km	MPC · JPL
714226	2015 KH_{192}	—	May 21, 2015	Haleakala	Pan-STARRS 1	·	990 m	MPC · JPL
714227	2015 KW_{193}	—	May 21, 2015	Haleakala	Pan-STARRS 1	·	1.5 km	MPC · JPL
714228	2015 KF_{194}	—	May 21, 2015	Haleakala	Pan-STARRS 1	·	980 m	MPC · JPL
714229	2015 KU_{194}	—	May 25, 2015	Haleakala	Pan-STARRS 1	·	890 m	MPC · JPL
714230	2015 KZ_{194}	—	May 22, 2015	Haleakala	Pan-STARRS 1	·	1.7 km	MPC · JPL
714231	2015 KB_{195}	—	May 21, 2015	Haleakala	Pan-STARRS 1	·	1.2 km	MPC · JPL
714232	2015 KO_{197}	—	May 21, 2015	Haleakala	Pan-STARRS 1	·	890 m	MPC · JPL
714233	2015 KE_{200}	—	May 21, 2015	Haleakala	Pan-STARRS 1	·	910 m	MPC · JPL
714234	2015 KS_{205}	—	May 18, 2015	Haleakala	Pan-STARRS 1	·	1.6 km	MPC · JPL
714235	2015 KE_{210}	—	March 21, 2001	Kitt Peak	SKADS	·	1.1 km	MPC · JPL
714236	2015 KM_{210}	—	August 7, 2016	Haleakala	Pan-STARRS 1	·	1.9 km	MPC · JPL
714237	2015 KQ_{227}	—	June 18, 2015	Haleakala	Pan-STARRS 1	·	810 m	MPC · JPL
714238	2015 KQ_{231}	—	May 25, 2015	Haleakala	Pan-STARRS 1	·	1.4 km	MPC · JPL
714239	2015 KB_{247}	—	July 14, 2016	Haleakala	Pan-STARRS 1	·	1.0 km	MPC · JPL
714240	2015 KA_{261}	—	May 20, 2015	Cerro Tololo	DECam	·	1.3 km	MPC · JPL
714241	2015 KC_{267}	—	May 21, 2015	Haleakala	Pan-STARRS 1	·	1.1 km	MPC · JPL
714242	2015 KJ_{276}	—	August 2, 2016	Haleakala	Pan-STARRS 1	·	1.2 km	MPC · JPL
714243	2015 KO_{301}	—	February 13, 2010	Mount Lemmon	Mount Lemmon Survey	·	1.2 km	MPC · JPL
714244	2015 KM_{328}	—	August 13, 2016	Haleakala	Pan-STARRS 1	·	1.8 km	MPC · JPL
714245	2015 KF_{356}	—	January 25, 2014	Haleakala	Pan-STARRS 1	(16286)	1.3 km	MPC · JPL
714246	2015 KG_{369}	—	May 21, 2015	Cerro Tololo	DECam	·	2.2 km	MPC · JPL
714247	2015 KQ_{372}	—	May 23, 2015	Cerro Tololo	DECam	·	2.3 km	MPC · JPL
714248	2015 KB_{394}	—	May 25, 2015	Haleakala	Pan-STARRS 1	·	2.3 km	MPC · JPL
714249	2015 LV	—	February 18, 2015	Haleakala	Pan-STARRS 1	HNS	1.2 km	MPC · JPL
714250	2015 LZ	—	June 5, 2015	Haleakala	Pan-STARRS 1	·	1.4 km	MPC · JPL
714251	2015 LJ_{2}	—	December 15, 2009	Mount Lemmon	Mount Lemmon Survey	MAR	1.1 km	MPC · JPL
714252	2015 LX_{3}	—	June 3, 2011	Mount Lemmon	Mount Lemmon Survey	JUN	990 m	MPC · JPL
714253	2015 LN_{5}	—	June 7, 2015	Haleakala	Pan-STARRS 1	·	1.6 km	MPC · JPL
714254	2015 LQ_{5}	—	February 20, 2009	Kitt Peak	Spacewatch	·	2.7 km	MPC · JPL
714255	2015 LL_{11}	—	October 18, 2012	Haleakala	Pan-STARRS 1	·	1.2 km	MPC · JPL
714256	2015 LW_{11}	—	July 15, 2007	Siding Spring	SSS	·	1.6 km	MPC · JPL
714257	2015 LX_{11}	—	November 6, 2012	Mount Lemmon	Mount Lemmon Survey	·	1.5 km	MPC · JPL
714258	2015 LD_{14}	—	October 23, 2006	Catalina	CSS	TIN	930 m	MPC · JPL
714259	2015 LS_{14}	—	June 11, 2015	Haleakala	Pan-STARRS 1	·	1.0 km	MPC · JPL
714260	2015 LH_{15}	—	January 15, 2010	Mount Lemmon	Mount Lemmon Survey	·	1.4 km	MPC · JPL
714261	2015 LS_{17}	—	November 9, 2009	Mount Lemmon	Mount Lemmon Survey	V	660 m	MPC · JPL
714262	2015 LA_{19}	—	July 23, 2011	Siding Spring	SSS	·	1.6 km	MPC · JPL
714263	2015 LE_{19}	—	June 11, 2015	Haleakala	Pan-STARRS 1	·	1.2 km	MPC · JPL
714264	2015 LF_{19}	—	June 11, 2015	Haleakala	Pan-STARRS 1	JUN	910 m	MPC · JPL
714265	2015 LD_{25}	—	September 24, 2011	Haleakala	Pan-STARRS 1	·	2.4 km	MPC · JPL
714266	2015 LP_{26}	—	June 13, 2015	Haleakala	Pan-STARRS 1	·	1.4 km	MPC · JPL
714267	2015 LH_{28}	—	April 3, 2011	Haleakala	Pan-STARRS 1	V	480 m	MPC · JPL
714268	2015 LS_{30}	—	December 5, 2007	Mount Lemmon	Mount Lemmon Survey	·	1.9 km	MPC · JPL
714269	2015 LW_{30}	—	September 20, 2011	Haleakala	Pan-STARRS 1	·	1.6 km	MPC · JPL
714270	2015 LP_{33}	—	October 25, 2011	Haleakala	Pan-STARRS 1	·	1.6 km	MPC · JPL
714271	2015 LK_{37}	—	March 13, 2011	Kitt Peak	Spacewatch	V	710 m	MPC · JPL
714272	2015 LW_{38}	—	September 19, 2007	Kitt Peak	Spacewatch	·	1.2 km	MPC · JPL
714273	2015 LE_{41}	—	June 2, 2015	Cerro Tololo	DECam	KOR	1.2 km	MPC · JPL
714274	2015 LC_{42}	—	October 3, 2006	Mount Lemmon	Mount Lemmon Survey	·	1.5 km	MPC · JPL
714275	2015 LJ_{42}	—	October 20, 2007	Mount Lemmon	Mount Lemmon Survey	·	1.4 km	MPC · JPL
714276	2015 LM_{43}	—	June 2, 2015	Cerro Tololo	DECam	·	1.7 km	MPC · JPL
714277	2015 LB_{44}	—	October 20, 2012	Kitt Peak	Spacewatch	·	1.2 km	MPC · JPL
714278	2015 LF_{44}	—	June 11, 2015	Haleakala	Pan-STARRS 1	·	1.1 km	MPC · JPL
714279	2015 LL_{44}	—	November 2, 2007	Kitt Peak	Spacewatch	GAL	1.3 km	MPC · JPL
714280	2015 LX_{45}	—	February 26, 2014	Haleakala	Pan-STARRS 1	·	1.4 km	MPC · JPL
714281	2015 LN_{48}	—	May 24, 2015	Haleakala	Pan-STARRS 1	·	1.5 km	MPC · JPL
714282	2015 LB_{49}	—	January 4, 2013	Cerro Tololo	DECam	·	1.2 km	MPC · JPL
714283	2015 LL_{51}	—	June 9, 2015	Haleakala	Pan-STARRS 1	·	1.5 km	MPC · JPL
714284	2015 LE_{54}	—	June 15, 2015	Haleakala	Pan-STARRS 1	·	1.2 km	MPC · JPL
714285	2015 LK_{56}	—	June 12, 2015	Haleakala	Pan-STARRS 1	·	1.4 km	MPC · JPL
714286	2015 LG_{57}	—	June 12, 2015	Mount Lemmon	Mount Lemmon Survey	·	3.1 km	MPC · JPL
714287	2015 LU_{58}	—	June 7, 2015	Mount Lemmon	Mount Lemmon Survey	·	1.6 km	MPC · JPL
714288	2015 ML_{2}	—	July 11, 2007	Siding Spring	SSS	·	1.6 km	MPC · JPL
714289	2015 MD_{3}	—	July 27, 2011	Haleakala	Pan-STARRS 1	·	1.5 km	MPC · JPL
714290	2015 MP_{3}	—	October 21, 2007	Mount Lemmon	Mount Lemmon Survey	·	1.7 km	MPC · JPL
714291	2015 MF_{5}	—	February 26, 2014	Haleakala	Pan-STARRS 1	·	1.6 km	MPC · JPL
714292	2015 MX_{5}	—	June 12, 2015	Mount Lemmon	Mount Lemmon Survey	·	1.6 km	MPC · JPL
714293	2015 MG_{6}	—	March 10, 2014	Mount Lemmon	Mount Lemmon Survey	·	1.2 km	MPC · JPL
714294	2015 MH_{6}	—	February 23, 2009	Calar Alto	F. Hormuth	·	1.4 km	MPC · JPL
714295	2015 MR_{8}	—	June 16, 2015	Haleakala	Pan-STARRS 1	GEF	1.1 km	MPC · JPL
714296	2015 MY_{8}	—	June 16, 2015	Haleakala	Pan-STARRS 1	·	1.0 km	MPC · JPL
714297	2015 MJ_{9}	—	June 13, 2015	Mount Lemmon	Mount Lemmon Survey	BRA	1.2 km	MPC · JPL
714298	2015 MQ_{12}	—	June 17, 2015	Haleakala	Pan-STARRS 1	AGN	910 m	MPC · JPL
714299	2015 MR_{12}	—	June 17, 2015	Haleakala	Pan-STARRS 1	EUN	930 m	MPC · JPL
714300	2015 MS_{12}	—	December 23, 2012	Haleakala	Pan-STARRS 1	·	900 m	MPC · JPL

== 714301–714400 ==
back to top

Designation			Discovery			Properties		Ref
Permanent	Provisional	Named after	Date	Site	Discoverer(s)	Category	Diam.	Ref
714301	2015 MN_{16}	—	November 27, 2009	Mount Lemmon	Mount Lemmon Survey	·	1.4 km	MPC · JPL
714302	2015 MO_{19}	—	May 28, 2011	Mount Lemmon	Mount Lemmon Survey	·	920 m	MPC · JPL
714303	2015 MH_{22}	—	April 25, 2015	Haleakala	Pan-STARRS 1	ADE	1.7 km	MPC · JPL
714304	2015 MN_{23}	—	November 6, 2012	Kitt Peak	Spacewatch	EOS	1.8 km	MPC · JPL
714305 Panceri	2015 MP_{23}	Panceri	September 27, 2011	Mount Graham	K. Černis, R. P. Boyle	·	2.1 km	MPC · JPL
714306	2015 MP_{24}	—	February 13, 2002	Apache Point	SDSS Collaboration	·	1.0 km	MPC · JPL
714307	2015 MY_{24}	—	May 4, 2006	Mount Lemmon	Mount Lemmon Survey	·	1.4 km	MPC · JPL
714308	2015 MY_{31}	—	November 12, 2012	Mount Lemmon	Mount Lemmon Survey	EUN	810 m	MPC · JPL
714309	2015 MM_{34}	—	April 19, 2015	Kitt Peak	Spacewatch	·	1.4 km	MPC · JPL
714310	2015 MN_{40}	—	June 18, 2015	Haleakala	Pan-STARRS 1	HNS	840 m	MPC · JPL
714311	2015 MY_{40}	—	March 28, 2015	Haleakala	Pan-STARRS 1	MAR	840 m	MPC · JPL
714312	2015 MT_{44}	—	June 17, 2015	Haleakala	Pan-STARRS 1	·	570 m	MPC · JPL
714313	2015 MC_{46}	—	November 11, 2007	Mount Lemmon	Mount Lemmon Survey	GEF	1.0 km	MPC · JPL
714314	2015 MR_{48}	—	November 19, 2008	Kitt Peak	Spacewatch	·	1.5 km	MPC · JPL
714315	2015 MW_{48}	—	June 17, 2015	Haleakala	Pan-STARRS 1	PHO	840 m	MPC · JPL
714316	2015 MX_{49}	—	November 19, 2003	Palomar	NEAT	·	1.1 km	MPC · JPL
714317	2015 ML_{50}	—	May 4, 2014	Haleakala	Pan-STARRS 1	BRA	1.1 km	MPC · JPL
714318	2015 MZ_{50}	—	December 6, 2007	Mount Lemmon	Mount Lemmon Survey	·	2.2 km	MPC · JPL
714319	2015 MG_{53}	—	October 21, 2008	Kitt Peak	Spacewatch	·	870 m	MPC · JPL
714320	2015 ML_{54}	—	October 21, 2012	Mount Lemmon	Mount Lemmon Survey	·	1.5 km	MPC · JPL
714321	2015 MZ_{54}	—	September 25, 2008	Kitt Peak	Spacewatch	·	1.6 km	MPC · JPL
714322	2015 MM_{55}	—	January 2, 2014	Kitt Peak	Spacewatch	HNS	1.1 km	MPC · JPL
714323	2015 MZ_{56}	—	September 10, 2007	Mount Lemmon	Mount Lemmon Survey	·	930 m	MPC · JPL
714324	2015 MO_{60}	—	June 20, 2015	Haleakala	Pan-STARRS 1	·	1.2 km	MPC · JPL
714325	2015 MS_{60}	—	October 1, 2005	Mount Lemmon	Mount Lemmon Survey	·	2.1 km	MPC · JPL
714326	2015 MW_{60}	—	May 21, 2015	Haleakala	Pan-STARRS 1	MAR	960 m	MPC · JPL
714327	2015 MC_{61}	—	December 3, 2012	Mount Lemmon	Mount Lemmon Survey	·	1.4 km	MPC · JPL
714328	2015 MC_{63}	—	June 15, 2015	Haleakala	Pan-STARRS 1	·	1.6 km	MPC · JPL
714329	2015 MC_{64}	—	June 15, 2015	Haleakala	Pan-STARRS 1	3:2	4.3 km	MPC · JPL
714330	2015 MB_{68}	—	January 24, 2014	Haleakala	Pan-STARRS 1	·	1.1 km	MPC · JPL
714331	2015 MW_{68}	—	May 30, 2006	Mount Lemmon	Mount Lemmon Survey	·	1.8 km	MPC · JPL
714332	2015 MA_{71}	—	October 15, 2007	Catalina	CSS	·	1.4 km	MPC · JPL
714333	2015 MC_{71}	—	June 22, 2015	Haleakala	Pan-STARRS 1	H	430 m	MPC · JPL
714334	2015 MQ_{73}	—	June 16, 2015	Haleakala	Pan-STARRS 1	·	1.7 km	MPC · JPL
714335	2015 MA_{74}	—	October 14, 2007	Mount Lemmon	Mount Lemmon Survey	·	1.5 km	MPC · JPL
714336	2015 MY_{74}	—	July 27, 2011	Haleakala	Pan-STARRS 1	·	1.3 km	MPC · JPL
714337	2015 MV_{75}	—	December 11, 2012	Mount Lemmon	Mount Lemmon Survey	EUN	1.2 km	MPC · JPL
714338	2015 MN_{76}	—	December 16, 2007	Kitt Peak	Spacewatch	·	1.6 km	MPC · JPL
714339	2015 MD_{79}	—	June 13, 2015	Mount Lemmon	Mount Lemmon Survey	·	1.5 km	MPC · JPL
714340	2015 MR_{81}	—	January 11, 2008	Mount Lemmon	Mount Lemmon Survey	EOS	1.3 km	MPC · JPL
714341	2015 MB_{82}	—	September 2, 2011	Haleakala	Pan-STARRS 1	WIT	790 m	MPC · JPL
714342	2015 MZ_{83}	—	June 22, 2015	Haleakala	Pan-STARRS 1	·	1.5 km	MPC · JPL
714343	2015 MD_{85}	—	September 14, 2007	Mount Lemmon	Mount Lemmon Survey	(7744)	1.3 km	MPC · JPL
714344	2015 MH_{85}	—	September 13, 2002	Palomar	NEAT	·	1.5 km	MPC · JPL
714345	2015 MW_{86}	—	February 1, 2006	Mount Lemmon	Mount Lemmon Survey	·	1.3 km	MPC · JPL
714346	2015 ME_{87}	—	May 7, 2010	Mount Lemmon	Mount Lemmon Survey	MRX	810 m	MPC · JPL
714347	2015 MX_{89}	—	June 21, 2015	Haleakala	Pan-STARRS 1	·	1.7 km	MPC · JPL
714348	2015 MZ_{89}	—	November 2, 2007	Kitt Peak	Spacewatch	·	2.0 km	MPC · JPL
714349	2015 ML_{90}	—	June 21, 2015	Haleakala	Pan-STARRS 1	·	1.9 km	MPC · JPL
714350	2015 MT_{90}	—	September 20, 2011	Kitt Peak	Spacewatch	·	1.5 km	MPC · JPL
714351	2015 MN_{92}	—	July 28, 2011	Siding Spring	SSS	·	1.4 km	MPC · JPL
714352	2015 MJ_{94}	—	December 7, 2012	Haleakala	Pan-STARRS 1	EUN	1.0 km	MPC · JPL
714353	2015 ME_{95}	—	August 15, 2006	Palomar	NEAT	·	1.9 km	MPC · JPL
714354	2015 MH_{96}	—	May 9, 2006	Mount Lemmon	Mount Lemmon Survey	·	1.4 km	MPC · JPL
714355	2015 MK_{96}	—	April 8, 2010	Mount Lemmon	Mount Lemmon Survey	·	1.5 km	MPC · JPL
714356	2015 MH_{98}	—	June 23, 2015	Haleakala	Pan-STARRS 1	EUN	890 m	MPC · JPL
714357	2015 MW_{98}	—	June 18, 2015	Haleakala	Pan-STARRS 1	·	1.2 km	MPC · JPL
714358	2015 MM_{99}	—	June 18, 2015	Haleakala	Pan-STARRS 1	·	1.4 km	MPC · JPL
714359	2015 MR_{99}	—	February 3, 2013	Haleakala	Pan-STARRS 1	VER	1.7 km	MPC · JPL
714360	2015 MG_{101}	—	June 20, 2015	Haleakala	Pan-STARRS 1	EUN	1.1 km	MPC · JPL
714361	2015 MA_{104}	—	November 18, 2007	Kitt Peak	Spacewatch	·	1.8 km	MPC · JPL
714362	2015 MH_{105}	—	August 31, 2011	Haleakala	Pan-STARRS 1	·	1.2 km	MPC · JPL
714363	2015 MA_{110}	—	October 20, 2007	Mount Lemmon	Mount Lemmon Survey	AGN	1.0 km	MPC · JPL
714364	2015 MF_{110}	—	June 26, 2015	Haleakala	Pan-STARRS 1	·	1.3 km	MPC · JPL
714365	2015 ML_{110}	—	September 11, 2002	Palomar	NEAT	·	1.4 km	MPC · JPL
714366	2015 MY_{110}	—	December 1, 2005	Kitt Peak	Wasserman, L. H., Millis, R. L.	·	890 m	MPC · JPL
714367	2015 MY_{113}	—	June 17, 2015	Haleakala	Pan-STARRS 1	·	1.8 km	MPC · JPL
714368	2015 MT_{114}	—	December 7, 2012	Elena Remote	Oreshko, A., T. V. Krjačko	·	1.5 km	MPC · JPL
714369	2015 MA_{115}	—	September 10, 2002	Palomar	NEAT	·	1.8 km	MPC · JPL
714370	2015 MD_{118}	—	June 27, 2015	Haleakala	Pan-STARRS 2	TIR	2.8 km	MPC · JPL
714371	2015 MR_{119}	—	January 5, 2013	Mount Lemmon	Mount Lemmon Survey	·	1.5 km	MPC · JPL
714372	2015 MC_{122}	—	October 17, 2011	Piszkés-tető	K. Sárneczky, A. Szing	ADE	1.7 km	MPC · JPL
714373	2015 MM_{122}	—	September 17, 1998	Kitt Peak	Spacewatch	·	630 m	MPC · JPL
714374	2015 ME_{124}	—	June 23, 2015	Haleakala	Pan-STARRS 2	·	1.6 km	MPC · JPL
714375	2015 MR_{124}	—	November 4, 2007	Kitt Peak	Spacewatch	·	1.4 km	MPC · JPL
714376	2015 MD_{125}	—	February 28, 2014	Mount Lemmon	Mount Lemmon Survey	·	1.7 km	MPC · JPL
714377	2015 MC_{128}	—	July 26, 2011	Haleakala	Pan-STARRS 1	·	960 m	MPC · JPL
714378 Char	2015 MT_{128}	Char	March 27, 2014	La Palma	EURONEAR	·	1.6 km	MPC · JPL
714379	2015 MY_{129}	—	June 29, 2015	Haleakala	Pan-STARRS 1	AGN	960 m	MPC · JPL
714380	2015 MC_{134}	—	September 18, 2011	Mount Lemmon	Mount Lemmon Survey	·	1.3 km	MPC · JPL
714381	2015 MG_{134}	—	September 21, 2011	Haleakala	Pan-STARRS 1	·	1.3 km	MPC · JPL
714382	2015 MB_{135}	—	June 17, 2015	Haleakala	Pan-STARRS 1	GAL	1.5 km	MPC · JPL
714383	2015 MD_{135}	—	July 28, 2011	Haleakala	Pan-STARRS 1	·	1.3 km	MPC · JPL
714384	2015 ME_{136}	—	June 18, 2015	Haleakala	Pan-STARRS 1	·	1.4 km	MPC · JPL
714385	2015 MO_{136}	—	January 3, 2013	Mount Lemmon	Mount Lemmon Survey	·	1.4 km	MPC · JPL
714386	2015 MT_{136}	—	June 26, 2015	Haleakala	Pan-STARRS 1	·	1.3 km	MPC · JPL
714387	2015 MA_{138}	—	June 26, 2015	Haleakala	Pan-STARRS 1	·	1.3 km	MPC · JPL
714388	2015 ME_{138}	—	January 25, 2009	Kitt Peak	Spacewatch	·	1.5 km	MPC · JPL
714389	2015 MJ_{138}	—	September 20, 2008	Mount Lemmon	Mount Lemmon Survey	·	780 m	MPC · JPL
714390	2015 MN_{138}	—	June 17, 2015	Haleakala	Pan-STARRS 1	·	870 m	MPC · JPL
714391	2015 MP_{138}	—	October 8, 2007	Catalina	CSS	·	1.5 km	MPC · JPL
714392	2015 MQ_{138}	—	September 28, 2003	Kitt Peak	Spacewatch	·	1.2 km	MPC · JPL
714393	2015 MS_{138}	—	June 19, 2015	Haleakala	Pan-STARRS 1	·	1.6 km	MPC · JPL
714394	2015 MD_{140}	—	December 29, 2011	Mount Lemmon	Mount Lemmon Survey	·	2.2 km	MPC · JPL
714395	2015 MJ_{140}	—	June 17, 2015	Haleakala	Pan-STARRS 1	·	1.4 km	MPC · JPL
714396	2015 MO_{140}	—	September 20, 2011	Kitt Peak	Spacewatch	·	1.5 km	MPC · JPL
714397	2015 MT_{140}	—	June 18, 2015	Haleakala	Pan-STARRS 1	AGN	890 m	MPC · JPL
714398	2015 MP_{141}	—	November 2, 2007	Kitt Peak	Spacewatch	NEM	1.7 km	MPC · JPL
714399	2015 MN_{142}	—	September 4, 2011	Haleakala	Pan-STARRS 1	HOF	2.1 km	MPC · JPL
714400	2015 MF_{143}	—	October 24, 2011	Haleakala	Pan-STARRS 1	·	2.1 km	MPC · JPL

== 714401–714500 ==
back to top

Designation			Discovery			Properties		Ref
Permanent	Provisional	Named after	Date	Site	Discoverer(s)	Category	Diam.	Ref
714401	2015 MO_{143}	—	April 4, 2003	Kitt Peak	Spacewatch	·	990 m	MPC · JPL
714402	2015 MR_{143}	—	February 28, 2014	Haleakala	Pan-STARRS 1	·	1.1 km	MPC · JPL
714403	2015 MA_{145}	—	February 26, 2014	Haleakala	Pan-STARRS 1	·	830 m	MPC · JPL
714404	2015 MC_{146}	—	December 23, 2012	Haleakala	Pan-STARRS 1	·	1.5 km	MPC · JPL
714405	2015 MQ_{146}	—	February 26, 2014	Mount Lemmon	Mount Lemmon Survey	·	960 m	MPC · JPL
714406	2015 MT_{146}	—	June 26, 2015	Haleakala	Pan-STARRS 1	·	1.2 km	MPC · JPL
714407	2015 MW_{146}	—	June 26, 2015	Haleakala	Pan-STARRS 1	·	1.3 km	MPC · JPL
714408	2015 MX_{147}	—	October 24, 2011	Kitt Peak	Spacewatch	·	1.5 km	MPC · JPL
714409	2015 MA_{148}	—	November 3, 2011	Mount Lemmon	Mount Lemmon Survey	·	1.7 km	MPC · JPL
714410	2015 MV_{148}	—	March 29, 2014	Mount Lemmon	Mount Lemmon Survey	·	1.6 km	MPC · JPL
714411	2015 MB_{149}	—	September 23, 2011	Haleakala	Pan-STARRS 1	·	1.8 km	MPC · JPL
714412	2015 MX_{155}	—	June 21, 2015	Mount Lemmon	Mount Lemmon Survey	·	1.6 km	MPC · JPL
714413	2015 MY_{163}	—	June 22, 2015	Haleakala	Pan-STARRS 1	·	2.8 km	MPC · JPL
714414	2015 MA_{167}	—	June 16, 2015	Mount Lemmon	Mount Lemmon Survey	·	1.4 km	MPC · JPL
714415	2015 MH_{168}	—	June 18, 2015	Haleakala	Pan-STARRS 1	·	2.5 km	MPC · JPL
714416	2015 MX_{170}	—	June 26, 2015	Haleakala	Pan-STARRS 1	·	1.6 km	MPC · JPL
714417	2015 ML_{171}	—	June 17, 2015	Haleakala	Pan-STARRS 1	AGN	870 m	MPC · JPL
714418	2015 MP_{173}	—	June 19, 2015	Haleakala	Pan-STARRS 1	·	1.3 km	MPC · JPL
714419	2015 MZ_{175}	—	June 20, 2015	Haleakala	Pan-STARRS 1	·	960 m	MPC · JPL
714420	2015 ML_{193}	—	June 27, 2015	Haleakala	Pan-STARRS 1	·	1.4 km	MPC · JPL
714421	2015 MQ_{195}	—	June 26, 2015	Haleakala	Pan-STARRS 1	·	1.5 km	MPC · JPL
714422	2015 MO_{197}	—	June 26, 2015	Haleakala	Pan-STARRS 1	KOR	950 m	MPC · JPL
714423	2015 NC	—	February 24, 2015	Haleakala	Pan-STARRS 1	·	1.4 km	MPC · JPL
714424	2015 NJ	—	May 25, 2015	Haleakala	Pan-STARRS 1	·	1.2 km	MPC · JPL
714425	2015 NQ	—	April 17, 2015	Mount Lemmon	Mount Lemmon Survey	·	1.5 km	MPC · JPL
714426	2015 NO_{3}	—	January 28, 2014	Kitt Peak	Spacewatch	MAR	930 m	MPC · JPL
714427	2015 NX_{4}	—	September 20, 2003	Kitt Peak	Spacewatch	·	1.3 km	MPC · JPL
714428	2015 NZ_{10}	—	March 28, 2015	Haleakala	Pan-STARRS 1	EUN	980 m	MPC · JPL
714429	2015 NM_{11}	—	May 18, 2015	Haleakala	Pan-STARRS 1	V	480 m	MPC · JPL
714430	2015 NV_{11}	—	March 25, 2010	Kitt Peak	Spacewatch	NEM	1.8 km	MPC · JPL
714431	2015 NS_{12}	—	June 18, 2005	Mount Lemmon	Mount Lemmon Survey	·	1.9 km	MPC · JPL
714432	2015 NX_{12}	—	September 22, 2003	Palomar	NEAT	MAR	1.4 km	MPC · JPL
714433	2015 NA_{16}	—	July 12, 2015	Haleakala	Pan-STARRS 1	·	1 km	MPC · JPL
714434	2015 ND_{18}	—	September 19, 2001	Apache Point	SDSS Collaboration	·	1.8 km	MPC · JPL
714435	2015 NS_{20}	—	October 22, 2012	Haleakala	Pan-STARRS 1	·	1.2 km	MPC · JPL
714436	2015 NC_{22}	—	December 11, 2013	Mount Lemmon	Mount Lemmon Survey	EUN	980 m	MPC · JPL
714437	2015 NB_{23}	—	August 3, 2011	Haleakala	Pan-STARRS 1	·	1.2 km	MPC · JPL
714438	2015 NH_{23}	—	March 28, 2014	Mount Lemmon	Mount Lemmon Survey	·	1.2 km	MPC · JPL
714439	2015 NP_{24}	—	June 17, 2015	Haleakala	Pan-STARRS 1	·	1.4 km	MPC · JPL
714440	2015 NU_{24}	—	June 20, 2015	Haleakala	Pan-STARRS 2	·	2.1 km	MPC · JPL
714441	2015 NO_{25}	—	December 20, 2009	Mount Lemmon	Mount Lemmon Survey	PHO	1.0 km	MPC · JPL
714442	2015 NM_{26}	—	July 8, 2015	Haleakala	Pan-STARRS 1	·	1.7 km	MPC · JPL
714443	2015 NV_{26}	—	December 9, 2012	Mount Lemmon	Mount Lemmon Survey	MAR	1.2 km	MPC · JPL
714444	2015 NC_{27}	—	October 15, 2007	Kitt Peak	Spacewatch	·	1.1 km	MPC · JPL
714445	2015 NQ_{27}	—	March 24, 2014	Haleakala	Pan-STARRS 1	EUN	1 km	MPC · JPL
714446	2015 NK_{28}	—	October 20, 2011	Mount Lemmon	Mount Lemmon Survey	·	1.5 km	MPC · JPL
714447	2015 NX_{28}	—	October 30, 2017	Haleakala	Pan-STARRS 1	·	1.2 km	MPC · JPL
714448	2015 NZ_{29}	—	July 7, 2015	Haleakala	Pan-STARRS 1	WIT	790 m	MPC · JPL
714449	2015 NL_{30}	—	July 12, 2015	Haleakala	Pan-STARRS 1	BRA	1.1 km	MPC · JPL
714450	2015 NQ_{30}	—	July 12, 2015	Haleakala	Pan-STARRS 1	EUN	840 m	MPC · JPL
714451	2015 NB_{32}	—	July 9, 2015	Haleakala	Pan-STARRS 1	·	1.6 km	MPC · JPL
714452	2015 NJ_{33}	—	July 12, 2015	Haleakala	Pan-STARRS 1	·	1.8 km	MPC · JPL
714453	2015 NK_{34}	—	July 12, 2015	Haleakala	Pan-STARRS 1	·	2.0 km	MPC · JPL
714454	2015 NR_{34}	—	July 12, 2015	Haleakala	Pan-STARRS 1	·	1.3 km	MPC · JPL
714455	2015 NL_{37}	—	July 12, 2015	Haleakala	Pan-STARRS 1	·	2.1 km	MPC · JPL
714456	2015 OC_{1}	—	November 20, 2008	Kitt Peak	Spacewatch	·	1.4 km	MPC · JPL
714457	2015 OQ_{1}	—	June 12, 2015	Haleakala	Pan-STARRS 2	·	1.7 km	MPC · JPL
714458	2015 OL_{2}	—	October 2, 2003	Kitt Peak	Spacewatch	EUN	1.3 km	MPC · JPL
714459	2015 ON_{2}	—	October 22, 2005	Kitt Peak	Spacewatch	·	720 m	MPC · JPL
714460	2015 OJ_{4}	—	January 31, 2009	Mount Lemmon	Mount Lemmon Survey	BRU	2.2 km	MPC · JPL
714461	2015 OR_{4}	—	April 1, 2014	Mount Lemmon	Mount Lemmon Survey	·	2.1 km	MPC · JPL
714462	2015 OT_{4}	—	October 20, 2011	Mount Lemmon	Mount Lemmon Survey	·	1.4 km	MPC · JPL
714463	2015 ON_{5}	—	September 29, 2011	Mount Lemmon	Mount Lemmon Survey	·	1.6 km	MPC · JPL
714464	2015 OQ_{5}	—	December 4, 2012	Mount Lemmon	Mount Lemmon Survey	·	2.0 km	MPC · JPL
714465	2015 OM_{6}	—	January 9, 2014	Haleakala	Pan-STARRS 1	·	1.1 km	MPC · JPL
714466	2015 ON_{7}	—	April 5, 2014	Haleakala	Pan-STARRS 1	·	2.2 km	MPC · JPL
714467	2015 OB_{9}	—	June 17, 2015	Haleakala	Pan-STARRS 1	HNS	1.1 km	MPC · JPL
714468	2015 OK_{9}	—	June 17, 2015	Haleakala	Pan-STARRS 1	·	2.1 km	MPC · JPL
714469	2015 OC_{10}	—	September 11, 2007	Mount Lemmon	Mount Lemmon Survey	·	1.2 km	MPC · JPL
714470	2015 OP_{10}	—	October 22, 2003	Apache Point	SDSS Collaboration	·	1.2 km	MPC · JPL
714471	2015 OF_{11}	—	November 9, 2007	Kitt Peak	Spacewatch	·	1.5 km	MPC · JPL
714472	2015 OL_{13}	—	June 29, 2015	Haleakala	Pan-STARRS 1	·	1.8 km	MPC · JPL
714473	2015 ON_{13}	—	July 18, 2015	Haleakala	Pan-STARRS 1	·	1.3 km	MPC · JPL
714474	2015 OW_{13}	—	September 30, 2006	Catalina	CSS	·	1.4 km	MPC · JPL
714475	2015 OB_{17}	—	July 27, 2011	Haleakala	Pan-STARRS 1	(5)	950 m	MPC · JPL
714476	2015 OJ_{19}	—	January 3, 2013	Mount Lemmon	Mount Lemmon Survey	·	1.9 km	MPC · JPL
714477	2015 OV_{20}	—	September 19, 2006	Catalina	CSS	·	1.2 km	MPC · JPL
714478	2015 OJ_{21}	—	December 16, 2007	Kitt Peak	Spacewatch	EUN	1.1 km	MPC · JPL
714479	2015 OS_{23}	—	May 6, 2006	Mount Lemmon	Mount Lemmon Survey	EUN	1.0 km	MPC · JPL
714480	2015 OY_{28}	—	September 24, 2011	Haleakala	Pan-STARRS 1	·	1.7 km	MPC · JPL
714481	2015 OZ_{29}	—	September 25, 2006	Mount Lemmon	Mount Lemmon Survey	·	1.6 km	MPC · JPL
714482	2015 OH_{31}	—	December 23, 2012	Haleakala	Pan-STARRS 1	·	1.1 km	MPC · JPL
714483	2015 OQ_{31}	—	May 26, 2006	Mount Lemmon	Mount Lemmon Survey	·	1.9 km	MPC · JPL
714484	2015 OF_{32}	—	July 23, 2015	Haleakala	Pan-STARRS 2	·	1.7 km	MPC · JPL
714485	2015 OR_{32}	—	March 25, 2014	Mount Lemmon	Mount Lemmon Survey	EUN	1.0 km	MPC · JPL
714486	2015 OU_{35}	—	March 22, 2015	Haleakala	Pan-STARRS 1	·	1.1 km	MPC · JPL
714487	2015 OY_{36}	—	January 17, 2013	Kitt Peak	Spacewatch	·	1.7 km	MPC · JPL
714488	2015 OG_{37}	—	June 27, 2015	Haleakala	Pan-STARRS 1	·	660 m	MPC · JPL
714489	2015 OQ_{37}	—	July 23, 2015	Haleakala	Pan-STARRS 1	EUN	990 m	MPC · JPL
714490	2015 OT_{37}	—	February 2, 2006	Kitt Peak	Spacewatch	·	1.1 km	MPC · JPL
714491	2015 OY_{37}	—	June 27, 2015	Haleakala	Pan-STARRS 1	·	1.2 km	MPC · JPL
714492	2015 OD_{44}	—	June 15, 2015	Haleakala	Pan-STARRS 1	·	1.2 km	MPC · JPL
714493	2015 OC_{47}	—	July 24, 2015	Haleakala	Pan-STARRS 1	·	1.8 km	MPC · JPL
714494	2015 OG_{50}	—	September 13, 2007	Mount Lemmon	Mount Lemmon Survey	MAR	740 m	MPC · JPL
714495	2015 OH_{50}	—	November 25, 2011	Haleakala	Pan-STARRS 1	·	1.6 km	MPC · JPL
714496	2015 ON_{50}	—	February 26, 2014	Catalina	CSS	·	1.5 km	MPC · JPL
714497	2015 OX_{52}	—	June 17, 2015	Haleakala	Pan-STARRS 1	·	1.4 km	MPC · JPL
714498	2015 OY_{53}	—	April 3, 2014	Haleakala	Pan-STARRS 1	VER	2.4 km	MPC · JPL
714499	2015 OK_{55}	—	July 26, 2015	Haleakala	Pan-STARRS 1	·	1.2 km	MPC · JPL
714500	2015 OQ_{59}	—	November 12, 2007	Mount Lemmon	Mount Lemmon Survey	·	1.4 km	MPC · JPL

== 714501–714600 ==
back to top

Designation			Discovery			Properties		Ref
Permanent	Provisional	Named after	Date	Site	Discoverer(s)	Category	Diam.	Ref
714501	2015 OV_{59}	—	May 7, 2014	Haleakala	Pan-STARRS 1	EUN	1.3 km	MPC · JPL
714502	2015 OX_{59}	—	December 21, 2012	Mount Lemmon	Mount Lemmon Survey	·	1.5 km	MPC · JPL
714503	2015 OM_{62}	—	July 26, 2015	Haleakala	Pan-STARRS 1	·	1.5 km	MPC · JPL
714504	2015 OY_{63}	—	December 5, 2007	Mount Lemmon	Mount Lemmon Survey	·	1.8 km	MPC · JPL
714505	2015 OD_{68}	—	January 1, 2009	Kitt Peak	Spacewatch	·	920 m	MPC · JPL
714506	2015 OZ_{68}	—	October 15, 2004	Mount Lemmon	Mount Lemmon Survey	·	1.1 km	MPC · JPL
714507	2015 OP_{69}	—	October 26, 2011	Haleakala	Pan-STARRS 1	·	1.3 km	MPC · JPL
714508	2015 OH_{70}	—	July 9, 2015	Haleakala	Pan-STARRS 1	·	840 m	MPC · JPL
714509	2015 OB_{71}	—	September 19, 2011	Haleakala	Pan-STARRS 1	·	1.3 km	MPC · JPL
714510	2015 OZ_{71}	—	February 28, 2014	Haleakala	Pan-STARRS 1	·	1.7 km	MPC · JPL
714511	2015 OE_{72}	—	March 24, 2014	Haleakala	Pan-STARRS 1	·	1.5 km	MPC · JPL
714512	2015 OP_{72}	—	September 4, 2011	Haleakala	Pan-STARRS 1	·	1.5 km	MPC · JPL
714513	2015 OF_{73}	—	October 23, 2011	Mount Lemmon	Mount Lemmon Survey	·	1.4 km	MPC · JPL
714514	2015 OU_{74}	—	October 6, 2002	Palomar	NEAT	JUN	930 m	MPC · JPL
714515	2015 OY_{75}	—	February 20, 2009	Kitt Peak	Spacewatch	·	1.4 km	MPC · JPL
714516	2015 OO_{81}	—	August 5, 2002	Palomar	NEAT	·	1.8 km	MPC · JPL
714517	2015 OS_{84}	—	February 11, 2004	Palomar	NEAT	(18466)	2.1 km	MPC · JPL
714518	2015 OL_{85}	—	July 24, 2015	Haleakala	Pan-STARRS 1	EUN	970 m	MPC · JPL
714519	2015 OM_{85}	—	July 25, 2015	Haleakala	Pan-STARRS 1	·	1.5 km	MPC · JPL
714520	2015 OS_{85}	—	October 27, 2011	Mount Lemmon	Mount Lemmon Survey	·	1.4 km	MPC · JPL
714521	2015 OY_{85}	—	September 25, 2006	Kitt Peak	Spacewatch	HOF	2.1 km	MPC · JPL
714522	2015 OE_{86}	—	May 8, 2014	Haleakala	Pan-STARRS 1	·	1.6 km	MPC · JPL
714523	2015 ON_{86}	—	July 25, 2015	Haleakala	Pan-STARRS 1	·	2.0 km	MPC · JPL
714524	2015 OO_{86}	—	July 26, 2015	Haleakala	Pan-STARRS 2	·	1.4 km	MPC · JPL
714525	2015 OP_{88}	—	September 16, 2010	Kitt Peak	Spacewatch	EMA	2.2 km	MPC · JPL
714526	2015 OL_{89}	—	May 7, 2014	Haleakala	Pan-STARRS 1	AGN	1.0 km	MPC · JPL
714527	2015 OO_{89}	—	January 17, 2013	Mount Lemmon	Mount Lemmon Survey	MAR	820 m	MPC · JPL
714528	2015 OP_{89}	—	September 23, 2011	Kitt Peak	Spacewatch	·	1.6 km	MPC · JPL
714529	2015 OW_{89}	—	February 16, 2013	Mount Lemmon	Mount Lemmon Survey	MAR	840 m	MPC · JPL
714530	2015 OL_{90}	—	September 29, 2011	Kitt Peak	Spacewatch	·	1.4 km	MPC · JPL
714531	2015 OW_{90}	—	May 8, 2014	Haleakala	Pan-STARRS 1	·	1.0 km	MPC · JPL
714532	2015 ON_{92}	—	July 19, 2015	Haleakala	Pan-STARRS 1	·	2.2 km	MPC · JPL
714533	2015 OQ_{92}	—	July 19, 2015	Haleakala	Pan-STARRS 1	EOS	1.3 km	MPC · JPL
714534	2015 OY_{93}	—	August 29, 2006	Kitt Peak	Spacewatch	·	1.6 km	MPC · JPL
714535	2015 OJ_{94}	—	February 3, 2013	Haleakala	Pan-STARRS 1	·	1.5 km	MPC · JPL
714536	2015 OC_{95}	—	April 9, 2014	Haleakala	Pan-STARRS 1	·	1.7 km	MPC · JPL
714537	2015 OE_{96}	—	September 23, 2006	Kitt Peak	Spacewatch	·	1.4 km	MPC · JPL
714538	2015 OY_{98}	—	May 2, 2014	Mount Lemmon	Mount Lemmon Survey	·	1.8 km	MPC · JPL
714539	2015 OA_{101}	—	February 3, 2013	Haleakala	Pan-STARRS 1	PAD	1.4 km	MPC · JPL
714540	2015 OE_{104}	—	March 22, 2014	Kitt Peak	Spacewatch	·	1.1 km	MPC · JPL
714541	2015 OQ_{104}	—	November 19, 2006	Kitt Peak	Spacewatch	KOR	1.2 km	MPC · JPL
714542	2015 OZ_{104}	—	April 10, 2014	Haleakala	Pan-STARRS 1	·	1.7 km	MPC · JPL
714543	2015 OD_{115}	—	July 18, 2015	Haleakala	Pan-STARRS 1	·	1.6 km	MPC · JPL
714544	2015 OZ_{122}	—	July 24, 2015	Haleakala	Pan-STARRS 1	·	2.7 km	MPC · JPL
714545	2015 OH_{125}	—	July 18, 2015	Haleakala	Pan-STARRS 1	·	1.2 km	MPC · JPL
714546	2015 OM_{127}	—	July 25, 2015	Haleakala	Pan-STARRS 1	·	1.5 km	MPC · JPL
714547	2015 OZ_{128}	—	July 25, 2015	Haleakala	Pan-STARRS 1	·	1.4 km	MPC · JPL
714548	2015 OT_{131}	—	July 24, 2015	Haleakala	Pan-STARRS 1	·	1.4 km	MPC · JPL
714549	2015 OB_{132}	—	July 24, 2015	Haleakala	Pan-STARRS 1	·	1.5 km	MPC · JPL
714550	2015 OH_{133}	—	July 25, 2015	Haleakala	Pan-STARRS 1	EOS	1.6 km	MPC · JPL
714551	2015 ON_{133}	—	July 19, 2015	Haleakala	Pan-STARRS 1	·	1.2 km	MPC · JPL
714552	2015 OJ_{135}	—	July 24, 2015	Haleakala	Pan-STARRS 1	·	2.0 km	MPC · JPL
714553	2015 OU_{135}	—	July 23, 2015	Haleakala	Pan-STARRS 1	·	1.3 km	MPC · JPL
714554	2015 OC_{136}	—	July 24, 2015	Haleakala	Pan-STARRS 1	PAD	1.1 km	MPC · JPL
714555	2015 OQ_{136}	—	July 25, 2015	Haleakala	Pan-STARRS 1	·	1.4 km	MPC · JPL
714556	2015 OH_{137}	—	July 28, 2015	Haleakala	Pan-STARRS 1	·	1.5 km	MPC · JPL
714557	2015 OC_{138}	—	July 23, 2015	Haleakala	Pan-STARRS 1	·	1.5 km	MPC · JPL
714558	2015 OG_{138}	—	July 25, 2015	Haleakala	Pan-STARRS 1	·	1.4 km	MPC · JPL
714559	2015 OY_{138}	—	July 25, 2015	Haleakala	Pan-STARRS 1	·	1.7 km	MPC · JPL
714560	2015 OC_{139}	—	July 19, 2015	Haleakala	Pan-STARRS 1	·	1.5 km	MPC · JPL
714561	2015 OQ_{139}	—	July 27, 2015	Haleakala	Pan-STARRS 1	·	1.5 km	MPC · JPL
714562	2015 OB_{144}	—	July 25, 2015	Haleakala	Pan-STARRS 1	·	1.4 km	MPC · JPL
714563	2015 OB_{145}	—	July 25, 2015	Haleakala	Pan-STARRS 1	·	1.5 km	MPC · JPL
714564	2015 OC_{145}	—	July 19, 2015	Haleakala	Pan-STARRS 1	·	1.4 km	MPC · JPL
714565	2015 OO_{153}	—	July 24, 2015	Haleakala	Pan-STARRS 1	·	1.9 km	MPC · JPL
714566	2015 OU_{156}	—	July 25, 2015	Haleakala	Pan-STARRS 1	·	1.8 km	MPC · JPL
714567	2015 OH_{159}	—	July 25, 2015	Haleakala	Pan-STARRS 1	·	1.6 km	MPC · JPL
714568	2015 OY_{160}	—	July 19, 2015	Haleakala	Pan-STARRS 1	·	1.3 km	MPC · JPL
714569	2015 OD_{165}	—	July 19, 2015	Haleakala	Pan-STARRS 1	·	1.2 km	MPC · JPL
714570	2015 OZ_{167}	—	November 17, 2009	Mount Lemmon	Mount Lemmon Survey	·	550 m	MPC · JPL
714571	2015 OZ_{168}	—	July 23, 2015	Haleakala	Pan-STARRS 1	·	1.6 km	MPC · JPL
714572	2015 PU	—	August 1, 2015	Haleakala	Pan-STARRS 1	·	2.1 km	MPC · JPL
714573	2015 PR_{9}	—	September 22, 2011	Kitt Peak	Spacewatch	AGN	1.2 km	MPC · JPL
714574	2015 PC_{17}	—	August 8, 2015	Haleakala	Pan-STARRS 1	EOS	1.3 km	MPC · JPL
714575	2015 PK_{17}	—	March 4, 2006	Kitt Peak	Spacewatch	·	800 m	MPC · JPL
714576	2015 PR_{17}	—	October 12, 2007	Mount Lemmon	Mount Lemmon Survey	·	1.6 km	MPC · JPL
714577	2015 PM_{18}	—	May 7, 2010	Mount Lemmon	Mount Lemmon Survey	·	1.5 km	MPC · JPL
714578	2015 PZ_{19}	—	June 15, 2015	Haleakala	Pan-STARRS 1	·	1.5 km	MPC · JPL
714579	2015 PZ_{20}	—	March 6, 2014	Oukaïmeden	C. Rinner	PHO	910 m	MPC · JPL
714580	2015 PU_{22}	—	November 24, 2011	Haleakala	Pan-STARRS 1	EOS	1.5 km	MPC · JPL
714581	2015 PF_{25}	—	July 24, 2015	Haleakala	Pan-STARRS 1	·	1.4 km	MPC · JPL
714582	2015 PK_{27}	—	September 19, 2007	Kitt Peak	Spacewatch	·	1.1 km	MPC · JPL
714583	2015 PM_{28}	—	December 23, 2012	Haleakala	Pan-STARRS 1	·	1.3 km	MPC · JPL
714584	2015 PQ_{29}	—	July 23, 2015	Haleakala	Pan-STARRS 1	·	1.4 km	MPC · JPL
714585	2015 PA_{30}	—	June 27, 2015	Haleakala	Pan-STARRS 1	·	1.9 km	MPC · JPL
714586	2015 PS_{31}	—	July 23, 2015	Haleakala	Pan-STARRS 1	·	1.8 km	MPC · JPL
714587	2015 PK_{32}	—	October 25, 2011	Haleakala	Pan-STARRS 1	MRX	930 m	MPC · JPL
714588	2015 PB_{33}	—	October 18, 2007	Kitt Peak	Spacewatch	·	1.7 km	MPC · JPL
714589	2015 PH_{33}	—	December 30, 2007	Kitt Peak	Spacewatch	TIN	1.0 km	MPC · JPL
714590	2015 PJ_{35}	—	May 10, 2005	Mount Lemmon	Mount Lemmon Survey	MRX	970 m	MPC · JPL
714591	2015 PO_{35}	—	December 3, 2008	Mount Lemmon	Mount Lemmon Survey	·	900 m	MPC · JPL
714592	2015 PA_{36}	—	February 27, 2014	Haleakala	Pan-STARRS 1	·	950 m	MPC · JPL
714593	2015 PK_{36}	—	February 24, 2014	Haleakala	Pan-STARRS 1	EUN	1.1 km	MPC · JPL
714594	2015 PD_{37}	—	March 8, 2014	Mount Lemmon	Mount Lemmon Survey	·	1.2 km	MPC · JPL
714595	2015 PQ_{37}	—	August 9, 2015	Haleakala	Pan-STARRS 1	·	1.5 km	MPC · JPL
714596	2015 PK_{39}	—	November 9, 2007	Mount Lemmon	Mount Lemmon Survey	·	1.3 km	MPC · JPL
714597	2015 PL_{39}	—	January 16, 2013	Haleakala	Pan-STARRS 1	·	1.4 km	MPC · JPL
714598	2015 PM_{39}	—	September 19, 2006	Kitt Peak	Spacewatch	NEM	2.0 km	MPC · JPL
714599	2015 PG_{41}	—	October 22, 2011	Kitt Peak	Spacewatch	·	1.7 km	MPC · JPL
714600	2015 PZ_{41}	—	December 4, 2007	Kitt Peak	Spacewatch	·	1.8 km	MPC · JPL

== 714601–714700 ==
back to top

Designation			Discovery			Properties		Ref
Permanent	Provisional	Named after	Date	Site	Discoverer(s)	Category	Diam.	Ref
714601	2015 PN_{42}	—	November 19, 2009	Mount Lemmon	Mount Lemmon Survey	·	620 m	MPC · JPL
714602	2015 PJ_{43}	—	December 23, 2012	Haleakala	Pan-STARRS 1	·	1.8 km	MPC · JPL
714603	2015 PR_{43}	—	October 20, 2011	Mount Lemmon	Mount Lemmon Survey	·	2.0 km	MPC · JPL
714604	2015 PF_{45}	—	November 9, 2007	Kitt Peak	Spacewatch	·	1.5 km	MPC · JPL
714605	2015 PT_{45}	—	January 3, 2009	Mount Lemmon	Mount Lemmon Survey	·	1.4 km	MPC · JPL
714606	2015 PA_{46}	—	June 17, 2015	Haleakala	Pan-STARRS 1	BRA	1.4 km	MPC · JPL
714607	2015 PT_{46}	—	August 9, 2015	Haleakala	Pan-STARRS 1	·	1.7 km	MPC · JPL
714608	2015 PV_{48}	—	February 9, 2013	Haleakala	Pan-STARRS 1	EUN	1.1 km	MPC · JPL
714609	2015 PG_{49}	—	June 20, 2015	Haleakala	Pan-STARRS 1	·	920 m	MPC · JPL
714610	2015 PV_{49}	—	March 16, 2005	Catalina	CSS	·	1.9 km	MPC · JPL
714611	2015 PW_{49}	—	October 24, 2011	Haleakala	Pan-STARRS 1	·	1.7 km	MPC · JPL
714612	2015 PX_{50}	—	March 13, 2014	Mount Lemmon	Mount Lemmon Survey	PHO	900 m	MPC · JPL
714613	2015 PE_{52}	—	November 15, 2007	Mount Lemmon	Mount Lemmon Survey	·	2.2 km	MPC · JPL
714614	2015 PH_{52}	—	November 22, 2006	Mount Lemmon	Mount Lemmon Survey	·	2.0 km	MPC · JPL
714615	2015 PU_{52}	—	September 24, 2011	Haleakala	Pan-STARRS 1	·	1.6 km	MPC · JPL
714616	2015 PR_{53}	—	May 7, 2014	Haleakala	Pan-STARRS 1	·	1.9 km	MPC · JPL
714617	2015 PJ_{54}	—	February 9, 2013	Haleakala	Pan-STARRS 1	WIT	810 m	MPC · JPL
714618	2015 PV_{55}	—	August 9, 2015	Haleakala	Pan-STARRS 1	·	1.7 km	MPC · JPL
714619	2015 PN_{58}	—	September 20, 2003	Palomar	NEAT	·	1.2 km	MPC · JPL
714620	2015 PJ_{60}	—	October 23, 2011	Haleakala	Pan-STARRS 1	·	1.7 km	MPC · JPL
714621	2015 PU_{60}	—	October 30, 2011	ESA OGS	ESA OGS	·	1.6 km	MPC · JPL
714622	2015 PT_{61}	—	April 29, 2006	Kitt Peak	Spacewatch	MAR	960 m	MPC · JPL
714623	2015 PC_{62}	—	June 19, 2010	Mount Lemmon	Mount Lemmon Survey	·	2.3 km	MPC · JPL
714624	2015 PB_{64}	—	June 26, 2015	Haleakala	Pan-STARRS 1	·	1.4 km	MPC · JPL
714625	2015 PC_{64}	—	July 19, 2015	Haleakala	Pan-STARRS 1	·	1.2 km	MPC · JPL
714626	2015 PG_{64}	—	June 18, 2015	Haleakala	Pan-STARRS 1	EOS	1.5 km	MPC · JPL
714627	2015 PR_{64}	—	December 23, 2012	Haleakala	Pan-STARRS 1	·	1.3 km	MPC · JPL
714628	2015 PD_{67}	—	April 2, 2006	Kitt Peak	Spacewatch	·	990 m	MPC · JPL
714629	2015 PP_{68}	—	July 19, 2015	Haleakala	Pan-STARRS 1	·	1.4 km	MPC · JPL
714630	2015 PT_{69}	—	July 14, 2015	Haleakala	Pan-STARRS 1	·	1.2 km	MPC · JPL
714631	2015 PO_{70}	—	July 28, 2011	Haleakala	Pan-STARRS 1	HNS	960 m	MPC · JPL
714632	2015 PO_{71}	—	February 3, 2013	Haleakala	Pan-STARRS 1	·	1.3 km	MPC · JPL
714633	2015 PR_{71}	—	January 25, 2014	Haleakala	Pan-STARRS 1	NYS	900 m	MPC · JPL
714634	2015 PR_{73}	—	September 18, 2006	Kitt Peak	Spacewatch	KOR	880 m	MPC · JPL
714635	2015 PM_{74}	—	October 10, 2007	Catalina	CSS	(5)	1.4 km	MPC · JPL
714636	2015 PM_{79}	—	July 19, 2015	Haleakala	Pan-STARRS 1	EOS	1.4 km	MPC · JPL
714637	2015 PO_{80}	—	January 11, 2008	Kitt Peak	Spacewatch	·	1.3 km	MPC · JPL
714638	2015 PG_{81}	—	July 14, 2015	Haleakala	Pan-STARRS 1	·	1.5 km	MPC · JPL
714639	2015 PE_{89}	—	August 29, 2011	Zelenchukskaya Station	T. V. Krjačko, B. Satovski	·	1.5 km	MPC · JPL
714640	2015 PA_{90}	—	September 25, 2011	Haleakala	Pan-STARRS 1	·	1.4 km	MPC · JPL
714641	2015 PK_{90}	—	May 12, 2011	Kitt Peak	Spacewatch	V	580 m	MPC · JPL
714642	2015 PW_{90}	—	February 20, 2014	Mount Lemmon	Mount Lemmon Survey	·	930 m	MPC · JPL
714643	2015 PU_{92}	—	August 10, 2015	Haleakala	Pan-STARRS 1	·	2.0 km	MPC · JPL
714644	2015 PL_{93}	—	November 2, 2007	Mount Lemmon	Mount Lemmon Survey	·	1.4 km	MPC · JPL
714645	2015 PS_{98}	—	August 10, 2015	Haleakala	Pan-STARRS 1	KOR	990 m	MPC · JPL
714646	2015 PA_{99}	—	September 26, 2011	Haleakala	Pan-STARRS 1	AST	1.3 km	MPC · JPL
714647	2015 PQ_{101}	—	September 25, 2006	Mount Lemmon	Mount Lemmon Survey	KOR	990 m	MPC · JPL
714648	2015 PE_{103}	—	April 7, 2006	Kitt Peak	Spacewatch	3:2	4.5 km	MPC · JPL
714649	2015 PO_{103}	—	July 25, 2015	Haleakala	Pan-STARRS 1	·	820 m	MPC · JPL
714650	2015 PX_{104}	—	November 9, 2007	Kitt Peak	Spacewatch	·	1.2 km	MPC · JPL
714651	2015 PO_{107}	—	March 25, 2007	Mount Lemmon	Mount Lemmon Survey	·	1.0 km	MPC · JPL
714652	2015 PR_{107}	—	August 15, 2004	Campo Imperatore	CINEOS	THM	2.0 km	MPC · JPL
714653	2015 PK_{108}	—	March 8, 2014	Mount Lemmon	Mount Lemmon Survey	·	1.2 km	MPC · JPL
714654	2015 PR_{108}	—	July 14, 2015	Haleakala	Pan-STARRS 1	·	1.7 km	MPC · JPL
714655	2015 PR_{109}	—	December 21, 2012	Mount Lemmon	Mount Lemmon Survey	·	1.4 km	MPC · JPL
714656	2015 PF_{111}	—	July 19, 2015	Haleakala	Pan-STARRS 1	AST	1.3 km	MPC · JPL
714657	2015 PF_{114}	—	February 5, 2013	Mount Lemmon	Mount Lemmon Survey	·	1.3 km	MPC · JPL
714658	2015 PM_{114}	—	August 10, 2015	Haleakala	Pan-STARRS 1	KOR	870 m	MPC · JPL
714659	2015 PJ_{117}	—	February 5, 2013	Mount Lemmon	Mount Lemmon Survey	·	1.3 km	MPC · JPL
714660	2015 PD_{120}	—	August 10, 2015	Haleakala	Pan-STARRS 1	·	1.5 km	MPC · JPL
714661	2015 PL_{122}	—	October 3, 2006	Mount Lemmon	Mount Lemmon Survey	KOR	1.1 km	MPC · JPL
714662	2015 PV_{126}	—	July 14, 2015	Haleakala	Pan-STARRS 1	·	2.4 km	MPC · JPL
714663	2015 PB_{127}	—	July 18, 2015	Haleakala	Pan-STARRS 1	·	1.7 km	MPC · JPL
714664	2015 PB_{129}	—	September 29, 2011	Mount Lemmon	Mount Lemmon Survey	·	1.4 km	MPC · JPL
714665	2015 PE_{130}	—	August 10, 2015	Haleakala	Pan-STARRS 1	·	1.9 km	MPC · JPL
714666	2015 PH_{130}	—	January 10, 2013	Haleakala	Pan-STARRS 1	·	1.4 km	MPC · JPL
714667	2015 PP_{135}	—	February 21, 2001	Kitt Peak	Spacewatch	·	1.3 km	MPC · JPL
714668	2015 PD_{138}	—	May 21, 2014	Haleakala	Pan-STARRS 1	AGN	870 m	MPC · JPL
714669	2015 PW_{141}	—	March 23, 2006	Mount Lemmon	Mount Lemmon Survey	·	1.2 km	MPC · JPL
714670	2015 PA_{142}	—	December 16, 2007	Kitt Peak	Spacewatch	·	1.4 km	MPC · JPL
714671	2015 PS_{142}	—	November 7, 2012	Mount Lemmon	Mount Lemmon Survey	·	790 m	MPC · JPL
714672	2015 PE_{143}	—	June 30, 2015	Haleakala	Pan-STARRS 1	·	1.5 km	MPC · JPL
714673	2015 PG_{144}	—	August 10, 2015	Haleakala	Pan-STARRS 1	GEF	950 m	MPC · JPL
714674	2015 PY_{144}	—	September 25, 2006	Kitt Peak	Spacewatch	·	1.7 km	MPC · JPL
714675	2015 PN_{145}	—	December 30, 2007	Mount Lemmon	Mount Lemmon Survey	·	1.8 km	MPC · JPL
714676	2015 PN_{153}	—	February 22, 2009	Kitt Peak	Spacewatch	·	1.8 km	MPC · JPL
714677	2015 PU_{153}	—	March 18, 2010	Kitt Peak	Spacewatch	·	1.0 km	MPC · JPL
714678	2015 PE_{156}	—	June 17, 2015	Haleakala	Pan-STARRS 1	AGN	930 m	MPC · JPL
714679	2015 PA_{157}	—	July 27, 2011	Haleakala	Pan-STARRS 1	·	1.0 km	MPC · JPL
714680	2015 PE_{158}	—	June 17, 2015	Haleakala	Pan-STARRS 1	·	1.4 km	MPC · JPL
714681	2015 PB_{160}	—	December 30, 2007	Mount Lemmon	Mount Lemmon Survey	HOF	2.2 km	MPC · JPL
714682	2015 PY_{165}	—	October 27, 2006	Mount Lemmon	Mount Lemmon Survey	KOR	860 m	MPC · JPL
714683	2015 PE_{167}	—	April 5, 2014	Haleakala	Pan-STARRS 1	·	1.2 km	MPC · JPL
714684	2015 PA_{168}	—	March 5, 2013	Mount Lemmon	Mount Lemmon Survey	EOS	1.3 km	MPC · JPL
714685	2015 PU_{171}	—	January 6, 2013	Kitt Peak	Spacewatch	·	1.5 km	MPC · JPL
714686	2015 PO_{174}	—	September 12, 2007	Mount Lemmon	Mount Lemmon Survey	MAR	900 m	MPC · JPL
714687	2015 PK_{176}	—	December 5, 2007	Kitt Peak	Spacewatch	·	1.6 km	MPC · JPL
714688	2015 PT_{176}	—	February 20, 2009	Kitt Peak	Spacewatch	·	1.7 km	MPC · JPL
714689	2015 PL_{177}	—	May 2, 2014	Mount Lemmon	Mount Lemmon Survey	·	780 m	MPC · JPL
714690	2015 PM_{180}	—	June 21, 2010	Mount Lemmon	Mount Lemmon Survey	·	1.5 km	MPC · JPL
714691	2015 PG_{182}	—	October 3, 2011	Mount Lemmon	Mount Lemmon Survey	·	1.2 km	MPC · JPL
714692	2015 PU_{182}	—	October 20, 2011	Mount Lemmon	Mount Lemmon Survey	·	1.6 km	MPC · JPL
714693	2015 PT_{183}	—	March 19, 2009	Mount Lemmon	Mount Lemmon Survey	·	1.3 km	MPC · JPL
714694	2015 PU_{183}	—	September 15, 2006	Kitt Peak	Spacewatch	·	1.4 km	MPC · JPL
714695	2015 PA_{188}	—	August 10, 2015	Haleakala	Pan-STARRS 1	WIT	780 m	MPC · JPL
714696	2015 PF_{189}	—	May 7, 2014	Haleakala	Pan-STARRS 1	·	2.0 km	MPC · JPL
714697	2015 PM_{194}	—	October 23, 2011	Kitt Peak	Spacewatch	·	1.9 km	MPC · JPL
714698	2015 PM_{196}	—	October 20, 2011	Mount Lemmon	Mount Lemmon Survey	HOF	2.4 km	MPC · JPL
714699	2015 PM_{197}	—	May 7, 2014	Haleakala	Pan-STARRS 1	·	1.4 km	MPC · JPL
714700	2015 PL_{198}	—	December 11, 2012	Kitt Peak	Spacewatch	·	1.5 km	MPC · JPL

== 714701–714800 ==
back to top

Designation			Discovery			Properties		Ref
Permanent	Provisional	Named after	Date	Site	Discoverer(s)	Category	Diam.	Ref
714701	2015 PU_{198}	—	December 18, 2007	Mount Lemmon	Mount Lemmon Survey	HOF	2.2 km	MPC · JPL
714702	2015 PQ_{199}	—	March 29, 2009	Mount Lemmon	Mount Lemmon Survey	·	1.7 km	MPC · JPL
714703	2015 PK_{201}	—	March 10, 2014	Kitt Peak	Spacewatch	·	1.3 km	MPC · JPL
714704	2015 PU_{202}	—	October 21, 2011	Piszkéstető	K. Sárneczky	·	1.6 km	MPC · JPL
714705	2015 PE_{211}	—	November 18, 2011	Mount Lemmon	Mount Lemmon Survey	·	1.6 km	MPC · JPL
714706	2015 PA_{215}	—	September 24, 2011	Catalina	CSS	EUN	1.3 km	MPC · JPL
714707	2015 PZ_{217}	—	May 5, 2010	Mount Lemmon	Mount Lemmon Survey	·	1.2 km	MPC · JPL
714708	2015 PP_{218}	—	April 25, 2014	Kitt Peak	Spacewatch	·	1.6 km	MPC · JPL
714709	2015 PA_{219}	—	August 10, 2015	Haleakala	Pan-STARRS 1	·	1.7 km	MPC · JPL
714710	2015 PO_{219}	—	October 9, 2007	Kitt Peak	Spacewatch	·	1.2 km	MPC · JPL
714711	2015 PH_{221}	—	November 17, 2007	Kitt Peak	Spacewatch	·	1.9 km	MPC · JPL
714712	2015 PL_{224}	—	September 20, 2011	Haleakala	Pan-STARRS 1	MAR	780 m	MPC · JPL
714713	2015 PM_{227}	—	April 30, 2014	Haleakala	Pan-STARRS 1	·	2.0 km	MPC · JPL
714714	2015 PL_{230}	—	September 8, 2015	XuYi	PMO NEO Survey Program	·	1.2 km	MPC · JPL
714715	2015 PR_{230}	—	June 25, 2015	Haleakala	Pan-STARRS 1	·	1.5 km	MPC · JPL
714716	2015 PU_{232}	—	February 20, 2014	Mount Lemmon	Mount Lemmon Survey	·	1.6 km	MPC · JPL
714717	2015 PN_{233}	—	June 20, 2015	Haleakala	Pan-STARRS 1	EOS	1.3 km	MPC · JPL
714718	2015 PT_{233}	—	February 10, 2008	Kitt Peak	Spacewatch	·	2.9 km	MPC · JPL
714719	2015 PS_{239}	—	August 10, 2015	Haleakala	Pan-STARRS 1	KOR	1.0 km	MPC · JPL
714720	2015 PP_{245}	—	July 12, 2015	Haleakala	Pan-STARRS 1	·	1.5 km	MPC · JPL
714721	2015 PM_{246}	—	December 18, 2009	Mount Lemmon	Mount Lemmon Survey	·	420 m	MPC · JPL
714722	2015 PM_{253}	—	January 29, 2009	Mount Lemmon	Mount Lemmon Survey	·	1.5 km	MPC · JPL
714723	2015 PP_{254}	—	October 7, 2004	Kitt Peak	Spacewatch	·	2.6 km	MPC · JPL
714724	2015 PK_{255}	—	July 25, 2011	Haleakala	Pan-STARRS 1	·	830 m	MPC · JPL
714725	2015 PU_{255}	—	March 2, 2006	Kitt Peak	Spacewatch	·	820 m	MPC · JPL
714726	2015 PG_{256}	—	June 26, 2015	Haleakala	Pan-STARRS 1	·	1.3 km	MPC · JPL
714727	2015 PJ_{256}	—	September 25, 2011	Haleakala	Pan-STARRS 1	·	1.4 km	MPC · JPL
714728	2015 PL_{256}	—	April 5, 2014	Haleakala	Pan-STARRS 1	KOR	1.0 km	MPC · JPL
714729	2015 PT_{256}	—	February 3, 2013	Haleakala	Pan-STARRS 1	·	1.2 km	MPC · JPL
714730	2015 PX_{256}	—	October 10, 2007	Mount Lemmon	Mount Lemmon Survey	(29841)	1.2 km	MPC · JPL
714731	2015 PL_{259}	—	October 11, 2007	Kitt Peak	Spacewatch	·	1.5 km	MPC · JPL
714732	2015 PP_{260}	—	March 8, 2005	Mount Lemmon	Mount Lemmon Survey	·	1.1 km	MPC · JPL
714733	2015 PD_{263}	—	December 29, 2008	Mount Lemmon	Mount Lemmon Survey	·	870 m	MPC · JPL
714734	2015 PE_{263}	—	February 12, 2008	Kitt Peak	Spacewatch	·	2.0 km	MPC · JPL
714735	2015 PS_{263}	—	July 9, 2015	Kitt Peak	Spacewatch	·	1.6 km	MPC · JPL
714736	2015 PU_{263}	—	August 5, 2015	Haleakala	Pan-STARRS 1	·	1.5 km	MPC · JPL
714737	2015 PT_{265}	—	December 5, 2008	Kitt Peak	Spacewatch	·	1.1 km	MPC · JPL
714738	2015 PU_{265}	—	June 25, 2011	Mount Lemmon	Mount Lemmon Survey	EUN	1.0 km	MPC · JPL
714739	2015 PW_{265}	—	January 10, 2013	Kitt Peak	Spacewatch	·	920 m	MPC · JPL
714740	2015 PF_{272}	—	January 20, 2008	Kitt Peak	Spacewatch	·	1.5 km	MPC · JPL
714741	2015 PX_{273}	—	November 18, 2011	Mount Lemmon	Mount Lemmon Survey	·	1.4 km	MPC · JPL
714742	2015 PM_{275}	—	March 13, 2010	Kitt Peak	Spacewatch	PHO	830 m	MPC · JPL
714743	2015 PG_{278}	—	October 20, 2011	Mount Lemmon	Mount Lemmon Survey	HOF	1.9 km	MPC · JPL
714744	2015 PH_{280}	—	May 26, 2014	Haleakala	Pan-STARRS 1	VER	1.9 km	MPC · JPL
714745	2015 PJ_{280}	—	September 9, 2008	Mount Lemmon	Mount Lemmon Survey	·	1.0 km	MPC · JPL
714746	2015 PO_{280}	—	October 25, 2011	Haleakala	Pan-STARRS 1	·	1.6 km	MPC · JPL
714747	2015 PS_{280}	—	November 24, 2003	Kitt Peak	Spacewatch	·	1.2 km	MPC · JPL
714748	2015 PV_{280}	—	March 31, 2009	Kitt Peak	Spacewatch	·	1.9 km	MPC · JPL
714749	2015 PS_{281}	—	August 28, 2006	Siding Spring	SSS	·	1.6 km	MPC · JPL
714750	2015 PF_{282}	—	December 21, 2012	Mount Lemmon	Mount Lemmon Survey	·	1.7 km	MPC · JPL
714751	2015 PV_{284}	—	January 6, 2003	Kitt Peak	Deep Lens Survey	·	1.9 km	MPC · JPL
714752	2015 PJ_{285}	—	October 26, 2011	Haleakala	Pan-STARRS 1	·	1.6 km	MPC · JPL
714753	2015 PA_{286}	—	August 20, 2006	Palomar	NEAT	EUN	1.1 km	MPC · JPL
714754	2015 PX_{288}	—	October 31, 2010	Catalina	CSS	H	520 m	MPC · JPL
714755	2015 PY_{291}	—	August 28, 2006	Catalina	CSS	MRX	1.0 km	MPC · JPL
714756	2015 PY_{292}	—	May 19, 2010	Mount Lemmon	Mount Lemmon Survey	·	1.7 km	MPC · JPL
714757	2015 PF_{301}	—	May 23, 2014	Haleakala	Pan-STARRS 1	·	3.0 km	MPC · JPL
714758	2015 PH_{301}	—	November 25, 2011	Haleakala	Pan-STARRS 1	·	1.8 km	MPC · JPL
714759	2015 PV_{301}	—	December 6, 2011	Haleakala	Pan-STARRS 1	·	1.8 km	MPC · JPL
714760	2015 PK_{302}	—	March 26, 2003	Kitt Peak	Spacewatch	·	1.2 km	MPC · JPL
714761	2015 PU_{302}	—	August 13, 2015	Haleakala	Pan-STARRS 1	·	2.6 km	MPC · JPL
714762	2015 PA_{303}	—	October 24, 2011	Haleakala	Pan-STARRS 1	·	1.6 km	MPC · JPL
714763	2015 PN_{305}	—	November 19, 2003	Kitt Peak	Spacewatch	(5)	1.1 km	MPC · JPL
714764	2015 PU_{305}	—	February 28, 2009	Kitt Peak	Spacewatch	·	1.8 km	MPC · JPL
714765	2015 PA_{308}	—	August 9, 2015	Haleakala	Pan-STARRS 1	JUN	850 m	MPC · JPL
714766	2015 PX_{308}	—	October 1, 2011	Kitt Peak	Spacewatch	·	1.4 km	MPC · JPL
714767	2015 PJ_{309}	—	June 17, 2015	Haleakala	Pan-STARRS 1	·	1.8 km	MPC · JPL
714768	2015 PZ_{309}	—	September 18, 2006	Catalina	CSS	·	1.6 km	MPC · JPL
714769	2015 PX_{311}	—	October 28, 2011	Mount Lemmon	Mount Lemmon Survey	·	1.8 km	MPC · JPL
714770	2015 PT_{314}	—	December 30, 2011	Kitt Peak	Spacewatch	·	2.1 km	MPC · JPL
714771	2015 PR_{315}	—	August 9, 2015	Haleakala	Pan-STARRS 1	·	1.5 km	MPC · JPL
714772	2015 PG_{316}	—	January 16, 2013	Mount Lemmon	Mount Lemmon Survey	·	1.5 km	MPC · JPL
714773	2015 PO_{316}	—	August 31, 2011	Piszkéstető	K. Sárneczky	EUN	1.2 km	MPC · JPL
714774	2015 PY_{318}	—	August 12, 2010	Kitt Peak	Spacewatch	·	1.3 km	MPC · JPL
714775	2015 PF_{321}	—	August 12, 2015	Haleakala	Pan-STARRS 1	BRA	1.3 km	MPC · JPL
714776	2015 PT_{321}	—	October 19, 2012	Mount Lemmon	Mount Lemmon Survey	·	920 m	MPC · JPL
714777	2015 PV_{322}	—	August 14, 2015	Haleakala	Pan-STARRS 1	KOR	1.2 km	MPC · JPL
714778	2015 PK_{334}	—	May 7, 2014	Haleakala	Pan-STARRS 1	·	1.8 km	MPC · JPL
714779	2015 PL_{334}	—	August 12, 2015	Haleakala	Pan-STARRS 1	EOS	1.4 km	MPC · JPL
714780	2015 PT_{334}	—	April 29, 2014	Haleakala	Pan-STARRS 1	·	1.4 km	MPC · JPL
714781	2015 PY_{336}	—	August 12, 2015	Haleakala	Pan-STARRS 1	·	1.7 km	MPC · JPL
714782	2015 PS_{337}	—	August 11, 2015	Haleakala	Pan-STARRS 1	·	1.4 km	MPC · JPL
714783	2015 PP_{339}	—	August 9, 2015	Haleakala	Pan-STARRS 1	·	1.7 km	MPC · JPL
714784	2015 PP_{341}	—	August 10, 2015	Haleakala	Pan-STARRS 1	·	1.6 km	MPC · JPL
714785	2015 PU_{345}	—	August 11, 2015	Haleakala	Pan-STARRS 1	EOS	1.5 km	MPC · JPL
714786	2015 PE_{346}	—	August 14, 2015	Haleakala	Pan-STARRS 1	·	1.4 km	MPC · JPL
714787	2015 PS_{348}	—	August 12, 2015	Haleakala	Pan-STARRS 1	·	1.8 km	MPC · JPL
714788	2015 PC_{349}	—	August 10, 2015	Haleakala	Pan-STARRS 1	·	1.4 km	MPC · JPL
714789	2015 PW_{367}	—	May 4, 2014	Kitt Peak	Spacewatch	·	1.3 km	MPC · JPL
714790	2015 QW_{4}	—	February 19, 2009	Kitt Peak	Spacewatch	·	1.3 km	MPC · JPL
714791	2015 QQ_{5}	—	October 23, 2011	Mount Lemmon	Mount Lemmon Survey	·	1.4 km	MPC · JPL
714792	2015 QB_{7}	—	January 18, 2013	Mount Lemmon	Mount Lemmon Survey	NYS	1.1 km	MPC · JPL
714793	2015 QM_{7}	—	April 29, 2014	Haleakala	Pan-STARRS 1	·	1.6 km	MPC · JPL
714794	2015 QL_{8}	—	July 14, 2015	Haleakala	Pan-STARRS 1	·	1.7 km	MPC · JPL
714795	2015 QK_{11}	—	October 21, 2011	Zelenchukskaya Station	T. V. Krjačko, B. Satovski	EUN	1.4 km	MPC · JPL
714796	2015 QG_{13}	—	March 5, 2008	Mount Lemmon	Mount Lemmon Survey	·	1.8 km	MPC · JPL
714797	2015 QZ_{13}	—	August 21, 2015	Haleakala	Pan-STARRS 1	·	2.3 km	MPC · JPL
714798	2015 QG_{14}	—	April 3, 2008	Mount Lemmon	Mount Lemmon Survey	·	1.9 km	MPC · JPL
714799	2015 QN_{14}	—	October 31, 2011	Mount Lemmon	Mount Lemmon Survey	HOF	2.0 km	MPC · JPL
714800	2015 QH_{15}	—	February 6, 2013	Kitt Peak	Spacewatch	AGN	1.1 km	MPC · JPL

== 714801–714900 ==
back to top

Designation			Discovery			Properties		Ref
Permanent	Provisional	Named after	Date	Site	Discoverer(s)	Category	Diam.	Ref
714801	2015 QN_{15}	—	August 19, 2015	Kitt Peak	Spacewatch	·	1.5 km	MPC · JPL
714802	2015 QY_{15}	—	February 15, 2013	Haleakala	Pan-STARRS 1	·	1.8 km	MPC · JPL
714803	2015 QT_{16}	—	August 21, 2015	Haleakala	Pan-STARRS 1	·	1.6 km	MPC · JPL
714804	2015 QA_{17}	—	August 21, 2015	Haleakala	Pan-STARRS 1	·	1.5 km	MPC · JPL
714805	2015 QS_{17}	—	November 12, 2001	Apache Point	SDSS Collaboration	·	1.9 km	MPC · JPL
714806	2015 QF_{18}	—	August 21, 2015	Haleakala	Pan-STARRS 1	·	1.9 km	MPC · JPL
714807	2015 QO_{18}	—	April 1, 2003	Apache Point	SDSS Collaboration	·	1.8 km	MPC · JPL
714808	2015 QQ_{18}	—	January 17, 2007	Kitt Peak	Spacewatch	EOS	1.7 km	MPC · JPL
714809	2015 QT_{18}	—	August 21, 2015	Haleakala	Pan-STARRS 1	·	2.5 km	MPC · JPL
714810	2015 QU_{18}	—	January 10, 2008	Mount Lemmon	Mount Lemmon Survey	·	2.0 km	MPC · JPL
714811	2015 QE_{19}	—	June 19, 2006	Mount Lemmon	Mount Lemmon Survey	·	1.9 km	MPC · JPL
714812	2015 QM_{19}	—	August 21, 2015	Haleakala	Pan-STARRS 1	·	2.3 km	MPC · JPL
714813	2015 QC_{24}	—	August 21, 2015	Haleakala	Pan-STARRS 1	·	1.4 km	MPC · JPL
714814	2015 QS_{27}	—	August 21, 2015	Haleakala	Pan-STARRS 1	EOS	1.8 km	MPC · JPL
714815	2015 QT_{27}	—	October 24, 2011	Haleakala	Pan-STARRS 1	HOF	2.2 km	MPC · JPL
714816	2015 QW_{27}	—	August 21, 2015	Haleakala	Pan-STARRS 1	HOF	2.1 km	MPC · JPL
714817	2015 QZ_{28}	—	March 5, 2013	Haleakala	Pan-STARRS 1	·	1.5 km	MPC · JPL
714818	2015 QQ_{29}	—	August 21, 2015	Haleakala	Pan-STARRS 1	HOF	1.8 km	MPC · JPL
714819	2015 QU_{29}	—	August 21, 2015	Haleakala	Pan-STARRS 1	·	1.4 km	MPC · JPL
714820	2015 QF_{34}	—	August 21, 2015	Haleakala	Pan-STARRS 1	·	1.5 km	MPC · JPL
714821	2015 QR_{34}	—	August 21, 2015	Haleakala	Pan-STARRS 1	·	1.5 km	MPC · JPL
714822	2015 QF_{38}	—	September 6, 2007	Siding Spring	SSS	EUN	1.1 km	MPC · JPL
714823	2015 QF_{39}	—	August 18, 2015	Cerro Paranal	Altmann, M., Prusti, T.	·	1.3 km	MPC · JPL
714824	2015 RU_{3}	—	July 28, 2011	Haleakala	Pan-STARRS 1	·	1.7 km	MPC · JPL
714825	2015 RE_{5}	—	August 10, 2015	Haleakala	Pan-STARRS 1	·	2.2 km	MPC · JPL
714826	2015 RC_{8}	—	September 20, 2011	Kitt Peak	Spacewatch	·	1.5 km	MPC · JPL
714827	2015 RV_{9}	—	February 26, 2014	Haleakala	Pan-STARRS 1	GEF	870 m	MPC · JPL
714828	2015 RX_{9}	—	August 19, 2006	Kitt Peak	Spacewatch	·	1.5 km	MPC · JPL
714829	2015 RN_{10}	—	November 2, 2011	Kitt Peak	Spacewatch	·	1.7 km	MPC · JPL
714830	2015 RV_{10}	—	January 18, 2013	Kitt Peak	Spacewatch	·	1.8 km	MPC · JPL
714831	2015 RZ_{11}	—	June 25, 2015	Haleakala	Pan-STARRS 1	·	1.8 km	MPC · JPL
714832	2015 RF_{13}	—	July 12, 2015	Haleakala	Pan-STARRS 1	·	880 m	MPC · JPL
714833	2015 RR_{15}	—	November 16, 2011	Kitt Peak	Spacewatch	·	1.2 km	MPC · JPL
714834	2015 RC_{17}	—	June 19, 2010	Mount Lemmon	Mount Lemmon Survey	·	1.7 km	MPC · JPL
714835	2015 RD_{17}	—	November 18, 2011	Mount Lemmon	Mount Lemmon Survey	·	1.5 km	MPC · JPL
714836	2015 RF_{18}	—	October 2, 2006	Mount Lemmon	Mount Lemmon Survey	·	1.2 km	MPC · JPL
714837	2015 RZ_{18}	—	October 19, 2006	Catalina	CSS	·	1.3 km	MPC · JPL
714838	2015 RN_{19}	—	August 5, 2002	Palomar	NEAT	·	1.2 km	MPC · JPL
714839	2015 RD_{20}	—	September 2, 2010	Mount Lemmon	Mount Lemmon Survey	·	1.5 km	MPC · JPL
714840	2015 RT_{22}	—	February 13, 2008	Kitt Peak	Spacewatch	·	880 m	MPC · JPL
714841	2015 RE_{24}	—	July 16, 2010	WISE	WISE	KON	2.1 km	MPC · JPL
714842	2015 RK_{25}	—	September 26, 2011	Catalina	CSS	·	980 m	MPC · JPL
714843	2015 RV_{27}	—	October 18, 2011	Catalina	CSS	·	1.1 km	MPC · JPL
714844	2015 RC_{31}	—	September 17, 2006	Kitt Peak	Spacewatch	·	1.7 km	MPC · JPL
714845	2015 RF_{33}	—	March 5, 2013	Haleakala	Pan-STARRS 1	·	2.0 km	MPC · JPL
714846	2015 RR_{34}	—	September 9, 2015	Haleakala	Pan-STARRS 1	·	930 m	MPC · JPL
714847	2015 RR_{40}	—	September 2, 2010	Mount Lemmon	Mount Lemmon Survey	·	1.5 km	MPC · JPL
714848	2015 RM_{41}	—	September 15, 2006	Kitt Peak	Spacewatch	·	1.5 km	MPC · JPL
714849	2015 RR_{42}	—	May 28, 2014	Haleakala	Pan-STARRS 1	WIT	770 m	MPC · JPL
714850	2015 RZ_{43}	—	February 22, 2009	Calar Alto	F. Hormuth, Datson, J. C.	·	1.1 km	MPC · JPL
714851	2015 RS_{50}	—	October 31, 1999	Kitt Peak	Spacewatch	·	2.2 km	MPC · JPL
714852	2015 RV_{50}	—	September 10, 2010	Kitt Peak	Spacewatch	·	1.5 km	MPC · JPL
714853	2015 RP_{52}	—	May 31, 2009	Cerro Burek	I. de la Cueva	·	2.1 km	MPC · JPL
714854	2015 RD_{54}	—	February 20, 2009	Kitt Peak	Spacewatch	·	1.4 km	MPC · JPL
714855	2015 RB_{55}	—	November 6, 2010	Palomar	Palomar Transient Factory	·	1.6 km	MPC · JPL
714856	2015 RG_{57}	—	September 10, 2015	Haleakala	Pan-STARRS 1	KOR	1.1 km	MPC · JPL
714857	2015 RP_{57}	—	September 11, 2010	Ka-Dar	Gerke, V.	KOR	1.1 km	MPC · JPL
714858	2015 RB_{58}	—	September 10, 2015	Haleakala	Pan-STARRS 1	WIT	600 m	MPC · JPL
714859	2015 RV_{58}	—	February 27, 2009	Kitt Peak	Spacewatch	·	1.2 km	MPC · JPL
714860	2015 RJ_{60}	—	November 5, 2010	Mount Lemmon	Mount Lemmon Survey	·	1.9 km	MPC · JPL
714861	2015 RU_{60}	—	October 13, 2006	Kitt Peak	Spacewatch	·	1.7 km	MPC · JPL
714862	2015 RY_{60}	—	September 10, 2015	Haleakala	Pan-STARRS 1	HOF	1.9 km	MPC · JPL
714863	2015 RO_{63}	—	February 5, 2013	Kitt Peak	Spacewatch	·	1.5 km	MPC · JPL
714864	2015 RB_{65}	—	March 5, 2013	Mount Lemmon	Mount Lemmon Survey	·	1.5 km	MPC · JPL
714865	2015 RW_{65}	—	September 11, 2010	Kitt Peak	Spacewatch	KOR	1.0 km	MPC · JPL
714866	2015 RQ_{67}	—	February 28, 2012	Haleakala	Pan-STARRS 1	·	2.5 km	MPC · JPL
714867	2015 RW_{69}	—	October 13, 2006	Kitt Peak	Spacewatch	HOF	2.4 km	MPC · JPL
714868	2015 RX_{71}	—	March 15, 2013	Mount Lemmon	Mount Lemmon Survey	KOR	1.1 km	MPC · JPL
714869	2015 RM_{77}	—	September 10, 2015	Haleakala	Pan-STARRS 1	·	1.4 km	MPC · JPL
714870	2015 RS_{78}	—	November 16, 2006	Kitt Peak	Spacewatch	KOR	1.2 km	MPC · JPL
714871	2015 RT_{86}	—	June 24, 2015	Haleakala	Pan-STARRS 1	NAE	2.6 km	MPC · JPL
714872	2015 RC_{92}	—	October 1, 2011	Mayhill-ISON	L. Elenin	·	1.8 km	MPC · JPL
714873	2015 RS_{96}	—	August 8, 2004	Kleť	M. Tichý, J. Tichá	THM	2.2 km	MPC · JPL
714874	2015 RK_{97}	—	August 27, 2006	Kitt Peak	Spacewatch	·	1.5 km	MPC · JPL
714875	2015 RM_{97}	—	August 21, 2008	Kitt Peak	Spacewatch	·	660 m	MPC · JPL
714876	2015 RA_{99}	—	July 23, 2015	Haleakala	Pan-STARRS 1	·	2.1 km	MPC · JPL
714877	2015 RB_{100}	—	February 21, 2007	Kitt Peak	Spacewatch	·	2.0 km	MPC · JPL
714878	2015 RK_{103}	—	July 21, 2006	Catalina	CSS	·	1.5 km	MPC · JPL
714879	2015 RE_{104}	—	May 25, 2011	Nogales	M. Schwartz, P. R. Holvorcem	·	1 km	MPC · JPL
714880	2015 RZ_{107}	—	October 22, 2006	Catalina	CSS	·	1.5 km	MPC · JPL
714881	2015 RH_{110}	—	February 28, 2014	Haleakala	Pan-STARRS 1	·	690 m	MPC · JPL
714882	2015 RG_{114}	—	March 13, 2005	Moletai	K. Černis, Zdanavicius, J.	EUN	1.0 km	MPC · JPL
714883	2015 RP_{114}	—	August 20, 2006	Palomar	NEAT	·	1.7 km	MPC · JPL
714884	2015 RF_{115}	—	February 14, 2013	Haleakala	Pan-STARRS 1	·	1.7 km	MPC · JPL
714885	2015 RE_{116}	—	April 27, 2009	Palomar	Palomar Transient Factory	H	460 m	MPC · JPL
714886	2015 RG_{116}	—	October 16, 2006	Catalina	CSS	MRX	1 km	MPC · JPL
714887	2015 RK_{118}	—	March 2, 2009	Mount Lemmon	Mount Lemmon Survey	·	1.8 km	MPC · JPL
714888	2015 RL_{121}	—	July 25, 2015	Haleakala	Pan-STARRS 1	·	1.6 km	MPC · JPL
714889	2015 RX_{121}	—	November 6, 2002	Palomar	NEAT	JUN	1.0 km	MPC · JPL
714890	2015 RP_{126}	—	September 17, 2006	Kitt Peak	Spacewatch	·	1.7 km	MPC · JPL
714891	2015 RP_{132}	—	June 8, 2011	Nogales	M. Schwartz, P. R. Holvorcem	·	1.0 km	MPC · JPL
714892	2015 RY_{133}	—	September 28, 2011	Mount Lemmon	Mount Lemmon Survey	(29841)	1.2 km	MPC · JPL
714893	2015 RZ_{133}	—	January 23, 2006	Kitt Peak	Spacewatch	MAS	580 m	MPC · JPL
714894	2015 RF_{135}	—	October 1, 2006	Kitt Peak	Spacewatch	·	1.8 km	MPC · JPL
714895	2015 RN_{138}	—	September 28, 2011	Mount Lemmon	Mount Lemmon Survey	·	1.2 km	MPC · JPL
714896	2015 RK_{140}	—	July 25, 2015	Haleakala	Pan-STARRS 1	·	1.1 km	MPC · JPL
714897	2015 RV_{141}	—	February 21, 2009	Kitt Peak	Spacewatch	·	1.5 km	MPC · JPL
714898	2015 RM_{142}	—	July 23, 2015	Haleakala	Pan-STARRS 1	·	1.5 km	MPC · JPL
714899	2015 RY_{142}	—	May 7, 2014	Haleakala	Pan-STARRS 1	HOF	2.2 km	MPC · JPL
714900	2015 RA_{151}	—	May 21, 2014	Haleakala	Pan-STARRS 1	AGN	890 m	MPC · JPL

== 714901–715000 ==
back to top

Designation			Discovery			Properties		Ref
Permanent	Provisional	Named after	Date	Site	Discoverer(s)	Category	Diam.	Ref
714901	2015 RZ_{151}	—	March 18, 2013	Mount Lemmon	Mount Lemmon Survey	·	1.7 km	MPC · JPL
714902	2015 RW_{157}	—	September 15, 2006	Kitt Peak	Spacewatch	AGN	1.0 km	MPC · JPL
714903	2015 RH_{158}	—	October 26, 2011	Haleakala	Pan-STARRS 1	·	1.5 km	MPC · JPL
714904	2015 RD_{160}	—	April 7, 2014	Kitt Peak	Spacewatch	·	1.2 km	MPC · JPL
714905	2015 RB_{161}	—	September 18, 2011	Mount Lemmon	Mount Lemmon Survey	·	1.1 km	MPC · JPL
714906	2015 RC_{164}	—	May 7, 2014	Haleakala	Pan-STARRS 1	·	1.5 km	MPC · JPL
714907	2015 RQ_{166}	—	December 31, 2007	Kitt Peak	Spacewatch	·	1.4 km	MPC · JPL
714908	2015 RM_{167}	—	January 2, 2012	Kitt Peak	Spacewatch	·	2.0 km	MPC · JPL
714909	2015 RY_{168}	—	July 25, 2015	Haleakala	Pan-STARRS 1	·	1.5 km	MPC · JPL
714910	2015 RU_{169}	—	July 25, 2015	Haleakala	Pan-STARRS 1	·	1.1 km	MPC · JPL
714911	2015 RC_{174}	—	May 10, 2014	Kitt Peak	Spacewatch	·	1.5 km	MPC · JPL
714912	2015 RJ_{176}	—	September 26, 2011	Haleakala	Pan-STARRS 1	·	1.1 km	MPC · JPL
714913	2015 RN_{179}	—	February 8, 2013	Haleakala	Pan-STARRS 1	·	1.6 km	MPC · JPL
714914	2015 RS_{179}	—	February 18, 2010	Mount Lemmon	Mount Lemmon Survey	·	830 m	MPC · JPL
714915	2015 RQ_{180}	—	October 24, 2011	Haleakala	Pan-STARRS 1	·	1.1 km	MPC · JPL
714916	2015 RY_{185}	—	September 9, 2015	Haleakala	Pan-STARRS 1	·	1.5 km	MPC · JPL
714917	2015 RH_{189}	—	June 29, 2015	Haleakala	Pan-STARRS 1	·	1.7 km	MPC · JPL
714918	2015 RN_{193}	—	February 20, 2009	Kitt Peak	Spacewatch	·	1.3 km	MPC · JPL
714919	2015 RM_{197}	—	February 17, 2013	Mount Lemmon	Mount Lemmon Survey	·	1.4 km	MPC · JPL
714920	2015 RT_{201}	—	August 12, 2015	Haleakala	Pan-STARRS 1	KOR	1.1 km	MPC · JPL
714921	2015 RW_{205}	—	March 6, 2008	Kitt Peak	Spacewatch	·	1.7 km	MPC · JPL
714922	2015 RG_{211}	—	March 8, 2014	Mount Lemmon	Mount Lemmon Survey	·	1.7 km	MPC · JPL
714923	2015 RJ_{211}	—	January 20, 2009	Mount Lemmon	Mount Lemmon Survey	·	920 m	MPC · JPL
714924	2015 RO_{212}	—	June 20, 2015	Haleakala	Pan-STARRS 1	·	1.8 km	MPC · JPL
714925	2015 RQ_{212}	—	October 18, 2011	Mount Lemmon	Mount Lemmon Survey	·	1.4 km	MPC · JPL
714926	2015 RU_{212}	—	September 6, 2015	Haleakala	Pan-STARRS 1	KOR	980 m	MPC · JPL
714927	2015 RX_{212}	—	January 5, 2013	Mount Lemmon	Mount Lemmon Survey	·	1.7 km	MPC · JPL
714928	2015 RE_{220}	—	September 11, 2015	Haleakala	Pan-STARRS 1	·	1.4 km	MPC · JPL
714929	2015 RJ_{223}	—	August 12, 2015	Haleakala	Pan-STARRS 1	KOR	1.2 km	MPC · JPL
714930	2015 RJ_{227}	—	October 9, 2010	Mount Lemmon	Mount Lemmon Survey	·	1.5 km	MPC · JPL
714931	2015 RS_{227}	—	October 3, 2006	Mount Lemmon	Mount Lemmon Survey	AGN	950 m	MPC · JPL
714932	2015 RQ_{228}	—	February 2, 2008	Mount Lemmon	Mount Lemmon Survey	·	1.3 km	MPC · JPL
714933	2015 RE_{229}	—	March 31, 2013	Mount Lemmon	Mount Lemmon Survey	KOR	1.1 km	MPC · JPL
714934	2015 RH_{229}	—	September 11, 2015	Haleakala	Pan-STARRS 1	·	2.4 km	MPC · JPL
714935	2015 RN_{231}	—	March 20, 2007	Mount Lemmon	Mount Lemmon Survey	EOS	1.4 km	MPC · JPL
714936	2015 RV_{231}	—	September 11, 2015	Haleakala	Pan-STARRS 1	·	1.5 km	MPC · JPL
714937	2015 RB_{233}	—	April 10, 2013	Haleakala	Pan-STARRS 1	KOR	1.1 km	MPC · JPL
714938	2015 RH_{236}	—	September 11, 2015	Haleakala	Pan-STARRS 1	·	2.0 km	MPC · JPL
714939	2015 RO_{238}	—	September 11, 2015	Haleakala	Pan-STARRS 1	·	1.4 km	MPC · JPL
714940	2015 RK_{240}	—	August 12, 2015	Haleakala	Pan-STARRS 1	·	1.8 km	MPC · JPL
714941	2015 RP_{240}	—	November 28, 2006	Kitt Peak	Spacewatch	·	1.9 km	MPC · JPL
714942	2015 RY_{240}	—	April 18, 2013	Mount Lemmon	Mount Lemmon Survey	·	2.0 km	MPC · JPL
714943	2015 RU_{242}	—	February 18, 2007	Bergisch Gladbach	W. Bickel	EOS	1.6 km	MPC · JPL
714944	2015 RO_{243}	—	September 11, 2010	Mount Lemmon	Mount Lemmon Survey	·	1.7 km	MPC · JPL
714945	2015 RF_{253}	—	October 1, 2005	Mount Lemmon	Mount Lemmon Survey	KOR	1.1 km	MPC · JPL
714946	2015 RU_{253}	—	October 24, 2011	Haleakala	Pan-STARRS 1	·	1.4 km	MPC · JPL
714947	2015 RS_{254}	—	January 11, 2008	Kitt Peak	Spacewatch	·	1.4 km	MPC · JPL
714948	2015 RV_{254}	—	October 27, 2006	Mount Lemmon	Mount Lemmon Survey	·	2.0 km	MPC · JPL
714949	2015 RJ_{255}	—	October 25, 2011	Haleakala	Pan-STARRS 1	MRX	860 m	MPC · JPL
714950	2015 RK_{255}	—	May 8, 2014	Haleakala	Pan-STARRS 1	MRX	760 m	MPC · JPL
714951	2015 RB_{256}	—	April 18, 2007	Mount Lemmon	Mount Lemmon Survey	·	2.6 km	MPC · JPL
714952	2015 RX_{256}	—	February 15, 2013	Haleakala	Pan-STARRS 1	·	1.9 km	MPC · JPL
714953	2015 RR_{257}	—	March 5, 2013	Mount Lemmon	Mount Lemmon Survey	HOF	2.1 km	MPC · JPL
714954	2015 RN_{258}	—	February 3, 2013	Haleakala	Pan-STARRS 1	·	1.4 km	MPC · JPL
714955	2015 RY_{258}	—	February 2, 2006	Mount Lemmon	Mount Lemmon Survey	·	2.3 km	MPC · JPL
714956	2015 RO_{259}	—	May 27, 2014	Haleakala	Pan-STARRS 1	GEF	980 m	MPC · JPL
714957	2015 RR_{259}	—	September 21, 2011	Kitt Peak	Spacewatch	·	1.1 km	MPC · JPL
714958	2015 RX_{259}	—	September 12, 2015	Haleakala	Pan-STARRS 1	·	1.5 km	MPC · JPL
714959	2015 RY_{260}	—	April 4, 2014	Haleakala	Pan-STARRS 1	·	1.4 km	MPC · JPL
714960	2015 RL_{261}	—	April 10, 2013	Haleakala	Pan-STARRS 1	EOS	1.5 km	MPC · JPL
714961	2015 RQ_{261}	—	March 5, 2013	Mount Lemmon	Mount Lemmon Survey	PAD	1.3 km	MPC · JPL
714962	2015 RN_{263}	—	September 8, 2015	Haleakala	Pan-STARRS 1	·	1.8 km	MPC · JPL
714963	2015 RR_{263}	—	September 8, 2015	Haleakala	Pan-STARRS 1	EOS	1.7 km	MPC · JPL
714964	2015 RB_{264}	—	September 9, 2015	Haleakala	Pan-STARRS 1	AGN	840 m	MPC · JPL
714965	2015 RN_{264}	—	February 5, 2013	Kitt Peak	Spacewatch	·	1.8 km	MPC · JPL
714966	2015 RR_{264}	—	May 21, 2014	Haleakala	Pan-STARRS 1	·	1.5 km	MPC · JPL
714967	2015 RQ_{265}	—	September 18, 2006	Kitt Peak	Spacewatch	·	1.3 km	MPC · JPL
714968	2015 RS_{265}	—	October 8, 2004	Kitt Peak	Spacewatch	·	2.3 km	MPC · JPL
714969	2015 RP_{266}	—	October 26, 2008	Mount Lemmon	Mount Lemmon Survey	V	410 m	MPC · JPL
714970	2015 RR_{266}	—	September 11, 2010	Kitt Peak	Spacewatch	·	1.6 km	MPC · JPL
714971	2015 RK_{267}	—	January 23, 2006	Kitt Peak	Spacewatch	·	1.8 km	MPC · JPL
714972	2015 RC_{268}	—	November 18, 2011	Mount Lemmon	Mount Lemmon Survey	(5)	1.1 km	MPC · JPL
714973	2015 RM_{268}	—	October 21, 2006	Kitt Peak	Spacewatch	WIT	810 m	MPC · JPL
714974	2015 RQ_{268}	—	March 16, 2013	Kitt Peak	Spacewatch	·	1.4 km	MPC · JPL
714975	2015 RX_{271}	—	February 26, 2008	Mount Lemmon	Mount Lemmon Survey	·	1.5 km	MPC · JPL
714976	2015 RA_{272}	—	February 18, 2013	Mount Lemmon	Mount Lemmon Survey	·	980 m	MPC · JPL
714977	2015 RL_{272}	—	September 3, 2010	Mount Lemmon	Mount Lemmon Survey	·	1.6 km	MPC · JPL
714978	2015 RK_{273}	—	May 7, 2014	Haleakala	Pan-STARRS 1	·	1.7 km	MPC · JPL
714979	2015 RY_{274}	—	September 12, 2015	Haleakala	Pan-STARRS 1	AGN	890 m	MPC · JPL
714980	2015 RJ_{275}	—	May 22, 2014	Mount Lemmon	Mount Lemmon Survey	·	1.5 km	MPC · JPL
714981	2015 RK_{276}	—	September 12, 2015	Haleakala	Pan-STARRS 1	KOR	1.1 km	MPC · JPL
714982	2015 RV_{303}	—	September 6, 2015	Haleakala	Pan-STARRS 1	·	550 m	MPC · JPL
714983	2015 RX_{303}	—	September 9, 2015	Haleakala	Pan-STARRS 1	·	1.9 km	MPC · JPL
714984	2015 RG_{304}	—	September 11, 2015	Haleakala	Pan-STARRS 1	·	1.9 km	MPC · JPL
714985	2015 RB_{310}	—	September 9, 2015	Haleakala	Pan-STARRS 1	KOR	1.0 km	MPC · JPL
714986	2015 RD_{311}	—	September 11, 2015	Haleakala	Pan-STARRS 1	·	2.1 km	MPC · JPL
714987	2015 RF_{312}	—	September 11, 2015	Haleakala	Pan-STARRS 1	KOR	1.0 km	MPC · JPL
714988	2015 RW_{315}	—	September 9, 2015	Haleakala	Pan-STARRS 1	ARM	3.3 km	MPC · JPL
714989	2015 RY_{315}	—	September 11, 2015	Haleakala	Pan-STARRS 1	·	2.0 km	MPC · JPL
714990	2015 RP_{319}	—	September 27, 2010	Kitt Peak	Spacewatch	·	1.7 km	MPC · JPL
714991	2015 RR_{319}	—	September 12, 2015	Haleakala	Pan-STARRS 1	·	1.6 km	MPC · JPL
714992	2015 RW_{320}	—	September 5, 2015	Haleakala	Pan-STARRS 1	·	1.7 km	MPC · JPL
714993	2015 RW_{322}	—	September 11, 2015	Haleakala	Pan-STARRS 1	·	1.4 km	MPC · JPL
714994	2015 RC_{324}	—	September 12, 2015	Haleakala	Pan-STARRS 1	(159)	2.1 km	MPC · JPL
714995	2015 RC_{325}	—	September 12, 2015	Haleakala	Pan-STARRS 1	·	1.6 km	MPC · JPL
714996	2015 RY_{332}	—	September 9, 2015	Haleakala	Pan-STARRS 1	·	1.6 km	MPC · JPL
714997	2015 RO_{337}	—	September 11, 2015	Haleakala	Pan-STARRS 1	AGN	900 m	MPC · JPL
714998	2015 RA_{338}	—	September 9, 2015	Haleakala	Pan-STARRS 1	·	2.1 km	MPC · JPL
714999	2015 RG_{342}	—	September 12, 2015	Haleakala	Pan-STARRS 1	·	2.2 km	MPC · JPL
715000	2015 RP_{348}	—	March 1, 2012	Mount Lemmon	Mount Lemmon Survey	VER	1.9 km	MPC · JPL

back to top

== Meaning of names ==
As minor planet discoveries are confirmed, they are given a permanent number by the IAU's Minor Planet Center (MPC), and the discoverers can then submit names for them, following the IAU's naming conventions. The list below concerns those minor planets in the specified number-range that have received names, and explains the meanings of those names.

Official naming citations of newly named small Solar System bodies are approved and published in a bulletin by IAU's Working Group for Small Bodies Nomenclature (WGSBN). Before May 2021, citations were published in MPC's Minor Planet Circulars for many decades. Recent citations can also be found on the JPL Small-Body Database (SBDB). Until his death in 2016, German astronomer Lutz D. Schmadel compiled these citations into the Dictionary of Minor Planet Names (DMP) and regularly updated the collection.

Based on Paul Herget's The Names of the Minor Planets, Schmadel also researched the unclear origin of numerous asteroids, most of which had been named prior to World War II. This article incorporates text from this source, which is in the public domain: SBDB New namings may only be added to this list below after official publication as the preannouncement of names is condemned. The WGSBN publishes a comprehensive guideline for the naming rules of non-cometary small Solar System bodies.

Named minor planet	Provisional	This minor planet was named for...	Ref · Catalog
714305 Panceri	2015 MP_{23}	Sister Luigia (Carmelita Jacinta) Panceri (1893–1982), one of the four nuns who from 1917 to 1921 catalogued the 500 000 stars in the Vatican zone of the Carte du Ciel star atlas.	IAU · 714305
714378 Char	2015 MT_{128}	Farid Char, amateur astronomer and research assistant at the University of Antofagasta, Chile.	IAU · 714378
