= List of minor planets: 609001–610000 =

The following is a partial list of minor planets, running from minor-planet number 609001 through 610000, inclusive. The primary data for this and other partial lists is based on JPL's "Small-Body Orbital Elements" and data available from the Minor Planet Center. Critical list information is also provided by the MPC, unless otherwise specified from Lowell Observatory. A detailed description of the table's columns and additional sources are given on the main page including a complete list of every page in this series, and a statistical break-up on the dynamical classification of minor planets.

Also see the summary list of all named bodies in numerical and alphabetical order, and the corresponding naming citations for the number range of this particular list. New namings may only be added to this list after official publication, as the preannouncement of names is condemned by the Working Group for Small Bodies Nomenclature of the International Astronomical Union.

Near-Earth obj.	MBA (inner)	MBA (outer)	Centaur
Mars-crosser	MBA (middle)	Jupiter trojan	Trans-Neptunian obj.
Unclassified

== 609001–609100 ==
Designation			Discovery			Properties		Ref
Permanent	Provisional	Named after	Date	Site	Discoverer(s)	Category	Diam.	Ref
609001	2004 RG_{186}	—	October 1, 2000	Anderson Mesa	LONEOS	·	1.3 km	MPC · JPL
609002	2004 RG_{187}	—	September 10, 2004	Socorro	LINEAR	·	1.2 km	MPC · JPL
609003	2004 RS_{201}	—	September 10, 2004	Kitt Peak	Spacewatch	·	510 m	MPC · JPL
609004	2004 RV_{204}	—	March 21, 2002	Kitt Peak	Spacewatch	EOS	1.9 km	MPC · JPL
609005	2004 RO_{235}	—	September 10, 2004	Socorro	LINEAR	·	590 m	MPC · JPL
609006	2004 RB_{242}	—	September 10, 2004	Kitt Peak	Spacewatch	·	670 m	MPC · JPL
609007	2004 RY_{242}	—	September 10, 2004	Kitt Peak	Spacewatch	·	570 m	MPC · JPL
609008	2004 RB_{249}	—	September 12, 2004	Socorro	LINEAR	·	2.0 km	MPC · JPL
609009	2004 RJ_{259}	—	September 10, 2004	Kitt Peak	Spacewatch	·	970 m	MPC · JPL
609010	2004 RP_{259}	—	September 10, 2004	Kitt Peak	Spacewatch	·	960 m	MPC · JPL
609011	2004 RM_{260}	—	September 10, 2004	Kitt Peak	Spacewatch	·	890 m	MPC · JPL
609012	2004 RK_{262}	—	September 10, 2004	Kitt Peak	Spacewatch	EOS	1.3 km	MPC · JPL
609013	2004 RH_{265}	—	September 10, 2004	Kitt Peak	Spacewatch	TEL	1.1 km	MPC · JPL
609014	2004 RS_{265}	—	September 10, 2004	Kitt Peak	Spacewatch	EOS	1.7 km	MPC · JPL
609015	2004 RS_{267}	—	September 11, 2004	Kitt Peak	Spacewatch	·	2.5 km	MPC · JPL
609016	2004 RH_{269}	—	September 11, 2004	Kitt Peak	Spacewatch	·	1.9 km	MPC · JPL
609017	2004 RD_{271}	—	September 11, 2004	Kitt Peak	Spacewatch	EOS	1.4 km	MPC · JPL
609018	2004 RC_{277}	—	September 13, 2004	Kitt Peak	Spacewatch	MAR	1.2 km	MPC · JPL
609019	2004 RO_{277}	—	September 13, 2004	Kitt Peak	Spacewatch	EOS	1.6 km	MPC · JPL
609020	2004 RE_{281}	—	September 15, 2004	Kitt Peak	Spacewatch	EOS	1.8 km	MPC · JPL
609021	2004 RR_{281}	—	September 15, 2004	Kitt Peak	Spacewatch	·	2.3 km	MPC · JPL
609022	2004 RJ_{286}	—	February 8, 2002	Kitt Peak	Deep Ecliptic Survey	·	940 m	MPC · JPL
609023	2004 RJ_{289}	—	August 10, 2004	Palomar	NEAT	H	640 m	MPC · JPL
609024	2004 RH_{295}	—	September 11, 2004	Kitt Peak	Spacewatch	EOS	1.3 km	MPC · JPL
609025	2004 RN_{297}	—	September 11, 2004	Kitt Peak	Spacewatch	·	1.0 km	MPC · JPL
609026	2004 RP_{299}	—	September 11, 2004	Kitt Peak	Spacewatch	·	2.0 km	MPC · JPL
609027	2004 RT_{302}	—	September 11, 2004	Kitt Peak	Spacewatch	·	2.0 km	MPC · JPL
609028	2004 RY_{302}	—	August 22, 2004	Kitt Peak	Spacewatch	·	580 m	MPC · JPL
609029	2004 RS_{326}	—	September 13, 2004	Kitt Peak	Spacewatch	·	1.4 km	MPC · JPL
609030	2004 RB_{329}	—	September 15, 2004	Kitt Peak	Spacewatch	·	1.0 km	MPC · JPL
609031	2004 RK_{337}	—	September 15, 2004	Kitt Peak	Spacewatch	·	1.5 km	MPC · JPL
609032	2004 RJ_{344}	—	September 13, 2004	Kitt Peak	Spacewatch	·	1.9 km	MPC · JPL
609033	2004 RA_{347}	—	September 18, 2004	Socorro	LINEAR	·	500 m	MPC · JPL
609034	2004 RF_{351}	—	September 12, 2004	Mauna Kea	P. A. Wiegert, S. Popa	EOS	1.5 km	MPC · JPL
609035	2004 RM_{353}	—	January 22, 2006	Mount Lemmon	Mount Lemmon Survey	·	2.0 km	MPC · JPL
609036	2004 RX_{357}	—	October 20, 2004	Catalina	CSS	(5)	1.0 km	MPC · JPL
609037	2004 RT_{358}	—	March 2, 2011	Mount Lemmon	Mount Lemmon Survey	·	950 m	MPC · JPL
609038	2004 RU_{358}	—	August 7, 2008	Kitt Peak	Spacewatch	·	900 m	MPC · JPL
609039	2004 RF_{359}	—	January 21, 2012	Kitt Peak	Spacewatch	·	2.3 km	MPC · JPL
609040	2004 RK_{359}	—	April 23, 2015	Haleakala	Pan-STARRS 1	·	910 m	MPC · JPL
609041	2004 RS_{359}	—	September 9, 2015	Haleakala	Pan-STARRS 1	EOS	1.3 km	MPC · JPL
609042	2004 RU_{359}	—	September 7, 2004	Kitt Peak	Spacewatch	·	2.0 km	MPC · JPL
609043	2004 RO_{360}	—	February 17, 2007	Kitt Peak	Spacewatch	·	1.5 km	MPC · JPL
609044	2004 RR_{361}	—	January 3, 2009	Kitt Peak	Spacewatch	·	570 m	MPC · JPL
609045	2004 RK_{362}	—	December 19, 2009	Mount Lemmon	Mount Lemmon Survey	·	1.2 km	MPC · JPL
609046	2004 RY_{363}	—	May 20, 2015	Cerro Tololo	DECam	·	960 m	MPC · JPL
609047	2004 RJ_{364}	—	August 17, 2012	Haleakala	Pan-STARRS 1	EUN	760 m	MPC · JPL
609048	2004 RZ_{364}	—	September 11, 2004	Kitt Peak	Spacewatch	·	870 m	MPC · JPL
609049	2004 RD_{366}	—	September 9, 2004	Kitt Peak	Spacewatch	3:2	4.1 km	MPC · JPL
609050	2004 SZ_{4}	—	September 16, 2004	Mauna Kea	Pittichová, J.	MAR	960 m	MPC · JPL
609051	2004 SC_{7}	—	September 17, 2004	Kitt Peak	Spacewatch	·	2.1 km	MPC · JPL
609052	2004 SD_{9}	—	September 17, 2004	Wise	Polishook, D.	·	600 m	MPC · JPL
609053	2004 SV_{15}	—	September 7, 2004	Socorro	LINEAR	·	2.7 km	MPC · JPL
609054	2004 SX_{36}	—	September 17, 2004	Kitt Peak	Spacewatch	·	1.0 km	MPC · JPL
609055	2004 SF_{52}	—	September 18, 2004	Socorro	LINEAR	·	3.0 km	MPC · JPL
609056	2004 SS_{62}	—	September 24, 2004	Kitt Peak	Spacewatch	·	1.2 km	MPC · JPL
609057	2004 SH_{64}	—	September 10, 2015	Haleakala	Pan-STARRS 1	THM	1.7 km	MPC · JPL
609058	2004 SU_{64}	—	September 17, 2004	Kitt Peak	Spacewatch	·	590 m	MPC · JPL
609059	2004 SW_{64}	—	November 30, 2005	Mount Lemmon	Mount Lemmon Survey	3:2 · SHU	4.0 km	MPC · JPL
609060	2004 SC_{65}	—	March 9, 2007	Kitt Peak	Spacewatch	EOS	1.8 km	MPC · JPL
609061	2004 SW_{65}	—	September 23, 2004	Kitt Peak	Spacewatch	·	1.8 km	MPC · JPL
609062	2004 TJ_{8}	—	October 4, 2004	Kitt Peak	Spacewatch	·	2.2 km	MPC · JPL
609063	2004 TR_{32}	—	October 4, 2004	Kitt Peak	Spacewatch	·	2.5 km	MPC · JPL
609064	2004 TJ_{33}	—	October 4, 2004	Kitt Peak	Spacewatch	·	2.3 km	MPC · JPL
609065	2004 TA_{37}	—	October 4, 2004	Kitt Peak	Spacewatch	·	2.0 km	MPC · JPL
609066	2004 TL_{40}	—	October 4, 2004	Kitt Peak	Spacewatch	·	1.8 km	MPC · JPL
609067	2004 TB_{45}	—	October 4, 2004	Kitt Peak	Spacewatch	·	2.0 km	MPC · JPL
609068	2004 TX_{47}	—	October 4, 2004	Kitt Peak	Spacewatch	·	2.7 km	MPC · JPL
609069	2004 TW_{54}	—	October 4, 2004	Kitt Peak	Spacewatch	THM	2.2 km	MPC · JPL
609070	2004 TH_{62}	—	October 5, 2004	Kitt Peak	Spacewatch	·	2.3 km	MPC · JPL
609071	2004 TL_{64}	—	October 5, 2004	Kitt Peak	Spacewatch	·	2.1 km	MPC · JPL
609072	2004 TS_{71}	—	October 6, 2004	Kitt Peak	Spacewatch	·	800 m	MPC · JPL
609073	2004 TC_{73}	—	October 6, 2004	Kitt Peak	Spacewatch	·	2.2 km	MPC · JPL
609074	2004 TN_{73}	—	October 6, 2004	Kitt Peak	Spacewatch	·	740 m	MPC · JPL
609075	2004 TF_{77}	—	October 7, 2004	Kitt Peak	Spacewatch	·	540 m	MPC · JPL
609076	2004 TY_{82}	—	October 5, 2004	Kitt Peak	Spacewatch	·	2.2 km	MPC · JPL
609077	2004 TC_{91}	—	October 5, 2004	Kitt Peak	Spacewatch	KON	1.5 km	MPC · JPL
609078	2004 TP_{94}	—	October 5, 2004	Kitt Peak	Spacewatch	·	2.0 km	MPC · JPL
609079	2004 TE_{98}	—	October 5, 2004	Kitt Peak	Spacewatch	EOS	2.2 km	MPC · JPL
609080	2004 TE_{99}	—	September 14, 2004	Socorro	LINEAR	·	2.8 km	MPC · JPL
609081	2004 TD_{100}	—	October 5, 2004	Kitt Peak	Spacewatch	·	2.3 km	MPC · JPL
609082	2004 TM_{101}	—	October 6, 2004	Kitt Peak	Spacewatch	·	1.1 km	MPC · JPL
609083	2004 TP_{107}	—	October 7, 2004	Kitt Peak	Spacewatch	EOS	1.6 km	MPC · JPL
609084	2004 TP_{112}	—	October 8, 2004	Socorro	LINEAR	·	3.3 km	MPC · JPL
609085	2004 TV_{117}	—	October 2, 1999	Kitt Peak	Spacewatch	TEL	1.9 km	MPC · JPL
609086	2004 TC_{144}	—	October 4, 2004	Kitt Peak	Spacewatch	THM	2.1 km	MPC · JPL
609087	2004 TV_{146}	—	October 6, 2004	Kitt Peak	Spacewatch	·	860 m	MPC · JPL
609088	2004 TR_{149}	—	September 23, 2004	Kitt Peak	Spacewatch	·	2.6 km	MPC · JPL
609089	2004 TB_{150}	—	September 22, 2004	Kitt Peak	Spacewatch	·	1.2 km	MPC · JPL
609090	2004 TP_{150}	—	September 10, 2004	Kitt Peak	Spacewatch	·	1.7 km	MPC · JPL
609091	2004 TF_{152}	—	September 9, 2004	Kitt Peak	Spacewatch	·	1.9 km	MPC · JPL
609092	2004 TK_{152}	—	October 6, 2004	Kitt Peak	Spacewatch	·	2.4 km	MPC · JPL
609093	2004 TA_{153}	—	September 23, 2004	Kitt Peak	Spacewatch	EOS	1.4 km	MPC · JPL
609094	2004 TG_{154}	—	October 6, 2004	Kitt Peak	Spacewatch	·	1.7 km	MPC · JPL
609095	2004 TA_{165}	—	October 7, 2004	Kitt Peak	Spacewatch	EOS	1.4 km	MPC · JPL
609096	2004 TZ_{176}	—	October 4, 2004	Kitt Peak	Spacewatch	·	1.9 km	MPC · JPL
609097	2004 TN_{182}	—	October 7, 2004	Kitt Peak	Spacewatch	EOS	1.3 km	MPC · JPL
609098	2004 TN_{184}	—	October 7, 2004	Kitt Peak	Spacewatch	·	1.8 km	MPC · JPL
609099	2004 TR_{184}	—	October 7, 2004	Kitt Peak	Spacewatch	·	2.1 km	MPC · JPL
609100	2004 TB_{186}	—	September 10, 2004	Kitt Peak	Spacewatch	·	2.3 km	MPC · JPL

== 609101–609200 ==
back to top

Designation			Discovery			Properties		Ref
Permanent	Provisional	Named after	Date	Site	Discoverer(s)	Category	Diam.	Ref
609101	2004 TP_{193}	—	October 7, 2004	Kitt Peak	Spacewatch	EOS	1.8 km	MPC · JPL
609102	2004 TP_{194}	—	October 7, 2004	Kitt Peak	Spacewatch	·	1.9 km	MPC · JPL
609103	2004 TZ_{195}	—	October 7, 2004	Kitt Peak	Spacewatch	·	2.9 km	MPC · JPL
609104	2004 TB_{196}	—	October 7, 2004	Kitt Peak	Spacewatch	·	2.1 km	MPC · JPL
609105	2004 TR_{199}	—	October 7, 2004	Kitt Peak	Spacewatch	·	2.6 km	MPC · JPL
609106	2004 TW_{199}	—	October 7, 2004	Kitt Peak	Spacewatch	·	2.3 km	MPC · JPL
609107	2004 TO_{210}	—	September 15, 2004	Kitt Peak	Spacewatch	·	2.7 km	MPC · JPL
609108	2004 TK_{212}	—	October 8, 2004	Kitt Peak	Spacewatch	EOS	1.6 km	MPC · JPL
609109	2004 TR_{219}	—	September 17, 2004	Kitt Peak	Spacewatch	·	2.6 km	MPC · JPL
609110	2004 TR_{226}	—	October 8, 2004	Socorro	LINEAR	·	2.8 km	MPC · JPL
609111	2004 TC_{228}	—	October 8, 2004	Kitt Peak	Spacewatch	·	910 m	MPC · JPL
609112	2004 TC_{230}	—	October 8, 2004	Kitt Peak	Spacewatch	·	1.5 km	MPC · JPL
609113	2004 TP_{232}	—	November 10, 1993	Kitt Peak	Spacewatch	·	2.6 km	MPC · JPL
609114	2004 TX_{234}	—	October 8, 2004	Kitt Peak	Spacewatch	·	2.3 km	MPC · JPL
609115	2004 TP_{235}	—	October 8, 2004	Kitt Peak	Spacewatch	·	1.9 km	MPC · JPL
609116	2004 TY_{236}	—	October 9, 2004	Socorro	LINEAR	·	2.7 km	MPC · JPL
609117	2004 TG_{239}	—	October 9, 2004	Kitt Peak	Spacewatch	LIX	3.0 km	MPC · JPL
609118	2004 TM_{244}	—	October 7, 2004	Kitt Peak	Spacewatch	·	830 m	MPC · JPL
609119	2004 TO_{245}	—	October 7, 2004	Kitt Peak	Spacewatch	·	1.7 km	MPC · JPL
609120	2004 TK_{254}	—	October 9, 2004	Kitt Peak	Spacewatch	·	490 m	MPC · JPL
609121	2004 TS_{254}	—	October 9, 2004	Kitt Peak	Spacewatch	EOS	1.7 km	MPC · JPL
609122	2004 TU_{256}	—	October 9, 2004	Kitt Peak	Spacewatch	·	1.2 km	MPC · JPL
609123	2004 TA_{260}	—	October 9, 2004	Kitt Peak	Spacewatch	·	2.5 km	MPC · JPL
609124	2004 TB_{261}	—	October 9, 2004	Kitt Peak	Spacewatch	·	2.4 km	MPC · JPL
609125	2004 TA_{264}	—	October 9, 2004	Kitt Peak	Spacewatch	KON	1.7 km	MPC · JPL
609126	2004 TB_{264}	—	October 9, 2004	Kitt Peak	Spacewatch	·	2.8 km	MPC · JPL
609127	2004 TN_{267}	—	October 9, 2004	Kitt Peak	Spacewatch	THM	2.2 km	MPC · JPL
609128	2004 TX_{270}	—	October 9, 2004	Kitt Peak	Spacewatch	·	2.3 km	MPC · JPL
609129	2004 TP_{273}	—	October 9, 2004	Kitt Peak	Spacewatch	·	2.5 km	MPC · JPL
609130	2004 TW_{277}	—	October 9, 2004	Kitt Peak	Spacewatch	·	2.3 km	MPC · JPL
609131	2004 TC_{282}	—	October 13, 2004	Kitt Peak	Spacewatch	·	2.5 km	MPC · JPL
609132	2004 TN_{283}	—	October 8, 2004	Kitt Peak	Spacewatch	·	2.9 km	MPC · JPL
609133	2004 TC_{290}	—	October 10, 2004	Kitt Peak	Spacewatch	·	2.4 km	MPC · JPL
609134	2004 TT_{293}	—	October 10, 2004	Kitt Peak	Spacewatch	·	2.8 km	MPC · JPL
609135	2004 TD_{298}	—	October 12, 2004	Anderson Mesa	LONEOS	·	2.4 km	MPC · JPL
609136	2004 TS_{298}	—	October 13, 2004	Kitt Peak	Spacewatch	·	2.4 km	MPC · JPL
609137	2004 TD_{301}	—	October 4, 2004	Kitt Peak	Spacewatch	·	2.2 km	MPC · JPL
609138	2004 TH_{302}	—	September 23, 2004	Kitt Peak	Spacewatch	·	1.1 km	MPC · JPL
609139	2004 TR_{303}	—	October 5, 1996	Kitt Peak	Spacewatch	(5)	950 m	MPC · JPL
609140	2004 TC_{305}	—	October 10, 2004	Kitt Peak	Spacewatch	EOS	1.4 km	MPC · JPL
609141	2004 TO_{306}	—	October 10, 2004	Socorro	LINEAR	EOS	2.9 km	MPC · JPL
609142	2004 TZ_{311}	—	October 12, 1999	Kitt Peak	Spacewatch	·	1.8 km	MPC · JPL
609143	2004 TX_{313}	—	September 10, 2004	Kitt Peak	Spacewatch	HYG	2.1 km	MPC · JPL
609144	2004 TU_{317}	—	October 11, 2004	Kitt Peak	Spacewatch	·	2.1 km	MPC · JPL
609145	2004 TW_{320}	—	October 11, 2004	Kitt Peak	Spacewatch	·	440 m	MPC · JPL
609146	2004 TZ_{325}	—	October 14, 2004	Palomar	NEAT	MAR	970 m	MPC · JPL
609147	2004 TW_{326}	—	October 14, 2004	Palomar	NEAT	·	3.1 km	MPC · JPL
609148	2004 TA_{329}	—	May 22, 2003	Kitt Peak	Spacewatch	MAR	1.1 km	MPC · JPL
609149	2004 TJ_{332}	—	October 9, 2004	Kitt Peak	Spacewatch	EOS	1.7 km	MPC · JPL
609150	2004 TL_{336}	—	October 10, 2004	Kitt Peak	Spacewatch	·	2.8 km	MPC · JPL
609151	2004 TZ_{347}	—	August 23, 2004	Kitt Peak	Spacewatch	·	1.7 km	MPC · JPL
609152	2004 TW_{353}	—	October 15, 2004	Kitt Peak	Spacewatch	·	3.0 km	MPC · JPL
609153	2004 TJ_{354}	—	October 15, 2004	Mount Lemmon	Mount Lemmon Survey	EUP	2.5 km	MPC · JPL
609154	2004 TV_{354}	—	October 15, 2004	Mount Lemmon	Mount Lemmon Survey	·	3.3 km	MPC · JPL
609155	2004 TQ_{368}	—	October 7, 2004	Kitt Peak	Spacewatch	·	1.6 km	MPC · JPL
609156	2004 TN_{371}	—	September 25, 2012	Kitt Peak	Spacewatch	3:2	4.9 km	MPC · JPL
609157	2004 TL_{372}	—	November 12, 2013	Mount Lemmon	Mount Lemmon Survey	·	1.3 km	MPC · JPL
609158	2004 TP_{372}	—	August 23, 2008	Siding Spring	SSS	·	1.3 km	MPC · JPL
609159	2004 TW_{372}	—	April 18, 2007	Mount Lemmon	Mount Lemmon Survey	·	2.2 km	MPC · JPL
609160	2004 TX_{372}	—	October 2, 2008	Kitt Peak	Spacewatch	·	830 m	MPC · JPL
609161	2004 TA_{373}	—	October 15, 2004	Kitt Peak	Deep Ecliptic Survey	·	580 m	MPC · JPL
609162	2004 TB_{373}	—	March 10, 2007	Kitt Peak	Spacewatch	·	2.5 km	MPC · JPL
609163	2004 TG_{373}	—	September 23, 2009	Mount Lemmon	Mount Lemmon Survey	HYG	2.4 km	MPC · JPL
609164	2004 TU_{373}	—	October 10, 2004	Kitt Peak	Spacewatch	·	2.8 km	MPC · JPL
609165	2004 TA_{374}	—	October 20, 2016	Mount Lemmon	Mount Lemmon Survey	EUN	1.0 km	MPC · JPL
609166	2004 TF_{375}	—	September 21, 2008	Kitt Peak	Spacewatch	·	1.1 km	MPC · JPL
609167	2004 TO_{375}	—	October 8, 2015	Haleakala	Pan-STARRS 1	EOS	1.6 km	MPC · JPL
609168	2004 TA_{376}	—	February 19, 2012	Kitt Peak	Spacewatch	·	2.3 km	MPC · JPL
609169	2004 TH_{376}	—	September 10, 2012	Črni Vrh	Matičič, S.	EUN	960 m	MPC · JPL
609170	2004 TJ_{376}	—	October 9, 2004	Kitt Peak	Spacewatch	·	2.1 km	MPC · JPL
609171	2004 TZ_{376}	—	October 2, 2015	Mount Lemmon	Mount Lemmon Survey	·	1.9 km	MPC · JPL
609172	2004 TA_{377}	—	September 4, 2008	Kitt Peak	Spacewatch	·	950 m	MPC · JPL
609173	2004 TB_{377}	—	October 24, 2015	Mount Lemmon	Mount Lemmon Survey	·	2.0 km	MPC · JPL
609174	2004 TH_{377}	—	January 10, 2014	Mount Lemmon	Mount Lemmon Survey	(5)	860 m	MPC · JPL
609175	2004 TG_{378}	—	February 25, 2015	Haleakala	Pan-STARRS 1	EUN	1.0 km	MPC · JPL
609176	2004 TH_{378}	—	October 7, 2004	Kitt Peak	Spacewatch	·	1.6 km	MPC · JPL
609177	2004 TD_{379}	—	October 15, 2004	Mount Lemmon	Mount Lemmon Survey	·	2.1 km	MPC · JPL
609178	2004 TH_{379}	—	April 10, 2013	Haleakala	Pan-STARRS 1	·	2.2 km	MPC · JPL
609179	2004 TQ_{379}	—	June 4, 2011	Mount Lemmon	Mount Lemmon Survey	·	960 m	MPC · JPL
609180	2004 TV_{379}	—	October 10, 2004	Kitt Peak	Spacewatch	LIX	3.3 km	MPC · JPL
609181	2004 TF_{381}	—	November 21, 2017	Haleakala	Pan-STARRS 1	MAR	880 m	MPC · JPL
609182	2004 TT_{382}	—	April 18, 2015	Haleakala	Pan-STARRS 1	·	890 m	MPC · JPL
609183	2004 TA_{383}	—	October 2, 2015	Kitt Peak	Spacewatch	·	2.0 km	MPC · JPL
609184	2004 TK_{383}	—	October 10, 2004	Kitt Peak	Deep Ecliptic Survey	·	2.0 km	MPC · JPL
609185	2004 TG_{385}	—	October 6, 2004	Kitt Peak	Spacewatch	·	1.8 km	MPC · JPL
609186	2004 TB_{386}	—	October 10, 2004	Kitt Peak	Spacewatch	·	2.3 km	MPC · JPL
609187	2004 UK_{5}	—	October 8, 2004	Kitt Peak	Spacewatch	·	2.0 km	MPC · JPL
609188	2004 UB_{7}	—	October 21, 2004	Socorro	LINEAR	KON	2.1 km	MPC · JPL
609189	2004 UU_{11}	—	October 8, 2015	Haleakala	Pan-STARRS 1	TIR	2.2 km	MPC · JPL
609190	2004 UW_{11}	—	October 6, 2016	Haleakala	Pan-STARRS 1	KON	1.7 km	MPC · JPL
609191	2004 VK_{1}	—	October 8, 2004	Socorro	LINEAR	EUP	3.9 km	MPC · JPL
609192	2004 VF_{4}	—	October 10, 2004	Kitt Peak	Spacewatch	·	2.3 km	MPC · JPL
609193	2004 VJ_{9}	—	November 3, 2004	Catalina	CSS	·	1.4 km	MPC · JPL
609194	2004 VY_{34}	—	October 10, 2004	Kitt Peak	Spacewatch	·	1.1 km	MPC · JPL
609195	2004 VN_{36}	—	November 4, 2004	Kitt Peak	Spacewatch	·	2.2 km	MPC · JPL
609196	2004 VL_{42}	—	October 10, 2004	Kitt Peak	Spacewatch	·	2.5 km	MPC · JPL
609197	2004 VF_{43}	—	October 15, 2004	Mount Lemmon	Mount Lemmon Survey	·	1.1 km	MPC · JPL
609198	2004 VW_{44}	—	November 4, 2004	Kitt Peak	Spacewatch	·	580 m	MPC · JPL
609199	2004 VH_{45}	—	November 4, 2004	Kitt Peak	Spacewatch	·	2.4 km	MPC · JPL
609200	2004 VN_{48}	—	November 4, 2004	Kitt Peak	Spacewatch	THB	2.2 km	MPC · JPL

== 609201–609300 ==
back to top

Designation			Discovery			Properties		Ref
Permanent	Provisional	Named after	Date	Site	Discoverer(s)	Category	Diam.	Ref
609201	2004 VP_{48}	—	November 4, 2004	Kitt Peak	Spacewatch	·	1.3 km	MPC · JPL
609202	2004 VK_{49}	—	November 4, 2004	Kitt Peak	Spacewatch	EOS	1.9 km	MPC · JPL
609203	2004 VK_{50}	—	November 4, 2004	Kitt Peak	Spacewatch	(5)	870 m	MPC · JPL
609204	2004 VS_{51}	—	November 4, 2004	Kitt Peak	Spacewatch	·	1.3 km	MPC · JPL
609205	2004 VH_{63}	—	October 15, 2004	Kitt Peak	Spacewatch	THM	1.9 km	MPC · JPL
609206	2004 VJ_{73}	—	November 5, 2004	Palomar	NEAT	T_{j} (2.93)	4.2 km	MPC · JPL
609207	2004 VG_{80}	—	November 3, 2004	Kitt Peak	Spacewatch	·	2.3 km	MPC · JPL
609208	2004 VN_{81}	—	July 14, 1999	Socorro	LINEAR	·	1.8 km	MPC · JPL
609209	2004 VZ_{83}	—	November 10, 2004	Kitt Peak	Spacewatch	EOS	1.8 km	MPC · JPL
609210	2004 VD_{84}	—	October 10, 2004	Kitt Peak	Deep Ecliptic Survey	·	550 m	MPC · JPL
609211	2004 VL_{85}	—	November 10, 2004	Kitt Peak	Spacewatch	·	2.6 km	MPC · JPL
609212	2004 VZ_{86}	—	November 11, 2004	Kitt Peak	Spacewatch	LIX	3.2 km	MPC · JPL
609213	2004 VY_{87}	—	November 11, 2004	Kitt Peak	Spacewatch	·	2.8 km	MPC · JPL
609214	2004 VN_{88}	—	November 11, 2004	Kitt Peak	Spacewatch	·	2.5 km	MPC · JPL
609215	2004 VE_{95}	—	November 10, 2004	Kitt Peak	Deep Ecliptic Survey	·	2.3 km	MPC · JPL
609216	2004 VZ_{97}	—	November 9, 2004	Mauna Kea	Veillet, C.	(5)	1.0 km	MPC · JPL
609217	2004 VH_{102}	—	November 3, 2004	Kitt Peak	Spacewatch	EOS	1.5 km	MPC · JPL
609218	2004 VL_{105}	—	November 9, 2004	Mauna Kea	Veillet, C.	·	2.1 km	MPC · JPL
609219	2004 VG_{129}	—	November 3, 2004	Kitt Peak	Spacewatch	THM	1.5 km	MPC · JPL
609220	2004 VS_{129}	—	November 11, 2004	Kitt Peak	Deep Ecliptic Survey	·	1.9 km	MPC · JPL
609221	2004 VC_{131}	—	November 9, 2004	Mauna Kea	CFHT Legacy Survey	cubewano (cold)	211 km	MPC · JPL
609222	2004 VV_{131}	—	November 9, 2004	Mauna Kea	CFHT Legacy Survey	cubewano (cold)	168 km	MPC · JPL
609223	2004 VO_{132}	—	April 18, 2007	Kitt Peak	Spacewatch	·	2.7 km	MPC · JPL
609224	2004 VQ_{132}	—	February 28, 2014	Oukaïmeden	C. Rinner	·	1.2 km	MPC · JPL
609225	2004 VT_{132}	—	October 14, 2009	Mount Lemmon	Mount Lemmon Survey	EOS	1.7 km	MPC · JPL
609226	2004 VU_{132}	—	October 25, 2008	Mount Lemmon	Mount Lemmon Survey	(5)	910 m	MPC · JPL
609227	2004 VV_{132}	—	October 22, 2008	Kitt Peak	Spacewatch	·	1.1 km	MPC · JPL
609228	2004 VM_{133}	—	September 26, 2008	Kitt Peak	Spacewatch	·	1.4 km	MPC · JPL
609229	2004 VR_{133}	—	October 17, 2012	Mount Lemmon	Mount Lemmon Survey	·	1.2 km	MPC · JPL
609230	2004 VU_{133}	—	May 16, 2013	Mount Lemmon	Mount Lemmon Survey	·	610 m	MPC · JPL
609231	2004 VH_{134}	—	November 13, 2015	Mount Lemmon	Mount Lemmon Survey	·	2.4 km	MPC · JPL
609232	2004 VU_{134}	—	November 11, 2004	Kitt Peak	Spacewatch	·	670 m	MPC · JPL
609233	2004 VG_{136}	—	February 25, 2007	Mount Lemmon	Mount Lemmon Survey	·	2.3 km	MPC · JPL
609234	2004 VM_{136}	—	January 4, 2011	Mount Lemmon	Mount Lemmon Survey	·	2.0 km	MPC · JPL
609235	2004 VT_{136}	—	November 14, 2010	Mount Lemmon	Mount Lemmon Survey	·	2.2 km	MPC · JPL
609236	2004 VF_{137}	—	October 28, 2008	Mount Lemmon	Mount Lemmon Survey	MAR	970 m	MPC · JPL
609237	2004 VO_{137}	—	April 19, 2007	Mount Lemmon	Mount Lemmon Survey	·	1.9 km	MPC · JPL
609238	2004 VA_{138}	—	October 15, 2004	Mount Lemmon	Mount Lemmon Survey	·	2.4 km	MPC · JPL
609239	2004 WO_{5}	—	November 20, 2004	Kitt Peak	Spacewatch	·	1.1 km	MPC · JPL
609240	2004 WD_{8}	—	November 10, 2004	Kitt Peak	Spacewatch	·	900 m	MPC · JPL
609241	2004 WY_{12}	—	November 20, 2004	Kitt Peak	Spacewatch	·	3.6 km	MPC · JPL
609242	2004 WB_{13}	—	October 23, 2008	Kitt Peak	Spacewatch	·	1.1 km	MPC · JPL
609243	2004 WJ_{13}	—	November 17, 2004	Campo Imperatore	CINEOS	·	2.3 km	MPC · JPL
609244	2004 WO_{13}	—	December 10, 2010	Mount Lemmon	Mount Lemmon Survey	·	2.4 km	MPC · JPL
609245	2004 WC_{14}	—	November 20, 2004	Kitt Peak	Spacewatch	VER	2.8 km	MPC · JPL
609246	2004 WD_{14}	—	November 20, 2004	Kitt Peak	Spacewatch	·	970 m	MPC · JPL
609247	2004 WF_{14}	—	November 20, 2004	Kitt Peak	Spacewatch	·	1.1 km	MPC · JPL
609248	2004 XE_{4}	—	December 5, 2004	Kleť	M. Tichý, J. Tichá	·	3.2 km	MPC · JPL
609249	2004 XF_{14}	—	December 9, 2004	Kitt Peak	Spacewatch	·	3.1 km	MPC · JPL
609250	2004 XZ_{33}	—	December 2, 2004	Palomar	NEAT	·	2.0 km	MPC · JPL
609251	2004 XN_{46}	—	December 9, 2004	Kitt Peak	Spacewatch	·	590 m	MPC · JPL
609252	2004 XZ_{52}	—	July 24, 2003	Palomar	NEAT	·	1.5 km	MPC · JPL
609253	2004 XL_{55}	—	December 10, 2004	Kitt Peak	Spacewatch	ADE	1.4 km	MPC · JPL
609254	2004 XV_{56}	—	December 10, 2004	Kitt Peak	Spacewatch	·	3.1 km	MPC · JPL
609255	2004 XA_{63}	—	December 14, 2004	Campo Imperatore	CINEOS	BAR	1 km	MPC · JPL
609256	2004 XP_{90}	—	December 11, 2004	Kitt Peak	Spacewatch	EOS	1.6 km	MPC · JPL
609257	2004 XR_{91}	—	December 11, 2004	Kitt Peak	Spacewatch	·	2.7 km	MPC · JPL
609258	2004 XE_{93}	—	December 11, 2004	Kitt Peak	Spacewatch	·	3.6 km	MPC · JPL
609259	2004 XQ_{96}	—	December 11, 2004	Kitt Peak	Spacewatch	·	2.6 km	MPC · JPL
609260	2004 XU_{96}	—	December 11, 2004	Kitt Peak	Spacewatch	(5)	1.3 km	MPC · JPL
609261	2004 XM_{97}	—	December 11, 2004	Kitt Peak	Spacewatch	·	660 m	MPC · JPL
609262	2004 XF_{99}	—	December 12, 2004	Kitt Peak	Spacewatch	·	2.5 km	MPC · JPL
609263	2004 XF_{105}	—	July 28, 2003	Palomar	NEAT	·	4.6 km	MPC · JPL
609264	2004 XW_{114}	—	December 11, 2004	Kitt Peak	Spacewatch	EUN	1.3 km	MPC · JPL
609265	2004 XJ_{115}	—	December 11, 2004	Kitt Peak	Spacewatch	·	2.9 km	MPC · JPL
609266	2004 XB_{117}	—	December 12, 2004	Kitt Peak	Spacewatch	·	1.1 km	MPC · JPL
609267	2004 XE_{120}	—	December 12, 2004	Kitt Peak	Spacewatch	·	1.5 km	MPC · JPL
609268	2004 XL_{127}	—	December 14, 2004	Socorro	LINEAR	·	1.5 km	MPC · JPL
609269	2004 XG_{135}	—	December 15, 2004	Socorro	LINEAR	·	2.0 km	MPC · JPL
609270	2004 XX_{136}	—	December 15, 2004	Socorro	LINEAR	JUN	840 m	MPC · JPL
609271	2004 XD_{138}	—	December 13, 2004	Kitt Peak	Spacewatch	·	2.9 km	MPC · JPL
609272	2004 XF_{146}	—	December 14, 2004	Kitt Peak	Spacewatch	·	2.8 km	MPC · JPL
609273	2004 XH_{150}	—	December 15, 2004	Kitt Peak	Spacewatch	·	510 m	MPC · JPL
609274	2004 XN_{150}	—	September 19, 2003	Kitt Peak	Spacewatch	(31811)	2.9 km	MPC · JPL
609275	2004 XA_{154}	—	December 15, 2004	Kitt Peak	Spacewatch	·	3.0 km	MPC · JPL
609276	2004 XK_{154}	—	December 15, 2004	Kitt Peak	Spacewatch	·	3.1 km	MPC · JPL
609277	2004 XM_{160}	—	December 14, 2004	Kitt Peak	Spacewatch	·	1.4 km	MPC · JPL
609278	2004 XY_{160}	—	December 14, 2004	Kitt Peak	Spacewatch	·	2.9 km	MPC · JPL
609279	2004 XE_{162}	—	December 11, 2004	Kitt Peak	Spacewatch	·	2.0 km	MPC · JPL
609280	2004 XE_{166}	—	December 1, 2008	Mount Lemmon	Mount Lemmon Survey	·	1.6 km	MPC · JPL
609281	2004 XV_{172}	—	December 10, 2004	Kitt Peak	Spacewatch	TIR	2.4 km	MPC · JPL
609282	2004 XY_{175}	—	December 11, 2004	Kitt Peak	Spacewatch	·	1.3 km	MPC · JPL
609283	2004 XQ_{178}	—	November 4, 2004	Kitt Peak	Spacewatch	·	2.5 km	MPC · JPL
609284	2004 XV_{183}	—	December 9, 2004	Kitt Peak	Spacewatch	·	490 m	MPC · JPL
609285	2004 XJ_{184}	—	December 10, 2004	Kitt Peak	Spacewatch	·	1.9 km	MPC · JPL
609286	2004 XL_{185}	—	December 12, 2004	Kitt Peak	Spacewatch	·	1.2 km	MPC · JPL
609287	2004 XV_{188}	—	December 15, 2004	Mauna Kea	P. A. Wiegert, D. D. Balam	·	2.2 km	MPC · JPL
609288	2004 XE_{193}	—	October 10, 2007	Mount Lemmon	Mount Lemmon Survey	·	650 m	MPC · JPL
609289	2004 XG_{193}	—	December 12, 2004	Kitt Peak	Spacewatch	·	1.5 km	MPC · JPL
609290	2004 XL_{193}	—	March 1, 2009	Kitt Peak	Spacewatch	·	570 m	MPC · JPL
609291	2004 XO_{193}	—	December 28, 2011	Mount Lemmon	Mount Lemmon Survey	·	560 m	MPC · JPL
609292	2004 XR_{193}	—	October 6, 2012	Haleakala	Pan-STARRS 1	·	1.2 km	MPC · JPL
609293	2004 XW_{193}	—	December 14, 2010	Mount Lemmon	Mount Lemmon Survey	VER	2.6 km	MPC · JPL
609294	2004 XX_{193}	—	September 27, 2008	Mount Lemmon	Mount Lemmon Survey	·	980 m	MPC · JPL
609295	2004 XE_{194}	—	February 10, 2011	Catalina	CSS	·	3.2 km	MPC · JPL
609296	2004 XG_{194}	—	April 18, 2012	Kitt Peak	Spacewatch	·	2.5 km	MPC · JPL
609297	2004 XL_{195}	—	September 30, 2008	Mount Lemmon	Mount Lemmon Survey	·	1.3 km	MPC · JPL
609298	2004 XO_{195}	—	March 31, 2014	Mount Lemmon	Mount Lemmon Survey	·	980 m	MPC · JPL
609299	2004 XS_{195}	—	December 9, 2015	Mount Lemmon	Mount Lemmon Survey	ELF	3.1 km	MPC · JPL
609300	2004 XV_{195}	—	April 12, 2015	Haleakala	Pan-STARRS 1	(194)	1.5 km	MPC · JPL

== 609301–609400 ==
back to top

Designation			Discovery			Properties		Ref
Permanent	Provisional	Named after	Date	Site	Discoverer(s)	Category	Diam.	Ref
609301	2004 XA_{196}	—	August 27, 2016	Haleakala	Pan-STARRS 1	·	940 m	MPC · JPL
609302	2004 XR_{196}	—	November 3, 2008	Mount Lemmon	Mount Lemmon Survey	·	1.3 km	MPC · JPL
609303	2004 XZ_{196}	—	August 31, 2014	Haleakala	Pan-STARRS 1	·	630 m	MPC · JPL
609304	2004 XU_{197}	—	January 29, 2012	Kitt Peak	Spacewatch	(883)	680 m	MPC · JPL
609305	2004 XL_{198}	—	November 13, 2004	Goodricke-Pigott	R. A. Tucker	·	2.4 km	MPC · JPL
609306	2004 XV_{198}	—	December 14, 2015	Haleakala	Pan-STARRS 1	EOS	1.5 km	MPC · JPL
609307	2004 XD_{199}	—	December 15, 2004	Kitt Peak	Spacewatch	·	2.4 km	MPC · JPL
609308	2004 YJ_{11}	—	October 14, 1998	Kitt Peak	Spacewatch	THM	1.9 km	MPC · JPL
609309	2004 YG_{22}	—	December 19, 2004	Mount Lemmon	Mount Lemmon Survey	·	1.3 km	MPC · JPL
609310	2004 YM_{24}	—	December 16, 2004	Kitt Peak	Spacewatch	·	1.2 km	MPC · JPL
609311	2004 YG_{26}	—	December 19, 2004	Mount Lemmon	Mount Lemmon Survey	·	3.4 km	MPC · JPL
609312	2004 YO_{26}	—	December 19, 2004	Mount Lemmon	Mount Lemmon Survey	·	2.2 km	MPC · JPL
609313	2004 YM_{29}	—	December 16, 2004	Kitt Peak	Spacewatch	·	4.6 km	MPC · JPL
609314	2004 YE_{35}	—	December 19, 2004	Kitt Peak	Spacewatch	·	1.4 km	MPC · JPL
609315	2004 YP_{37}	—	December 19, 2004	Mount Lemmon	Mount Lemmon Survey	·	3.0 km	MPC · JPL
609316	2004 YV_{37}	—	December 20, 2004	Mount Lemmon	Mount Lemmon Survey	·	1.5 km	MPC · JPL
609317	2004 YB_{38}	—	December 19, 2004	Mount Lemmon	Mount Lemmon Survey	·	540 m	MPC · JPL
609318	2004 YC_{38}	—	December 13, 2010	Mauna Kea	M. Micheli, L. Wells	·	2.9 km	MPC · JPL
609319	2004 YG_{38}	—	December 20, 2004	Mount Lemmon	Mount Lemmon Survey	·	1.7 km	MPC · JPL
609320	2004 YR_{38}	—	December 1, 2010	Mount Lemmon	Mount Lemmon Survey	·	3.6 km	MPC · JPL
609321	2004 YX_{38}	—	October 28, 2008	Kitt Peak	Spacewatch	·	870 m	MPC · JPL
609322	2004 YZ_{38}	—	August 28, 2014	Haleakala	Pan-STARRS 1	·	3.1 km	MPC · JPL
609323	2004 YR_{39}	—	October 18, 2007	Kitt Peak	Spacewatch	·	530 m	MPC · JPL
609324	2004 YS_{39}	—	November 26, 2017	Mount Lemmon	Mount Lemmon Survey	·	1.6 km	MPC · JPL
609325	2004 YZ_{39}	—	September 12, 2007	Mount Lemmon	Mount Lemmon Survey	·	560 m	MPC · JPL
609326	2004 YR_{40}	—	January 30, 2017	Haleakala	Pan-STARRS 1	·	3.3 km	MPC · JPL
609327	2004 YV_{40}	—	November 1, 2015	Mount Lemmon	Mount Lemmon Survey	·	3.1 km	MPC · JPL
609328	2004 YG_{41}	—	August 28, 2014	Haleakala	Pan-STARRS 1	EOS	1.6 km	MPC · JPL
609329	2004 YQ_{41}	—	December 20, 2004	Mount Lemmon	Mount Lemmon Survey	·	2.9 km	MPC · JPL
609330	2005 AQ_{4}	—	January 6, 2005	Catalina	CSS	TIR	2.9 km	MPC · JPL
609331	2005 AP_{8}	—	January 6, 2005	Catalina	CSS	·	1.4 km	MPC · JPL
609332	2005 AC_{19}	—	December 19, 2004	Kitt Peak	Spacewatch	BAR	1.0 km	MPC · JPL
609333	2005 AM_{28}	—	January 6, 2005	Catalina	CSS	·	1.4 km	MPC · JPL
609334	2005 AO_{37}	—	January 13, 2005	Kitt Peak	Spacewatch	EOS	2.4 km	MPC · JPL
609335	2005 AU_{37}	—	October 21, 2003	Kitt Peak	Spacewatch	HYG	3.1 km	MPC · JPL
609336	2005 AS_{39}	—	January 13, 2005	Kitt Peak	Spacewatch	·	4.5 km	MPC · JPL
609337	2005 AY_{52}	—	January 13, 2005	Kitt Peak	Spacewatch	·	1.8 km	MPC · JPL
609338	2005 AP_{58}	—	January 15, 2005	Socorro	LINEAR	·	1.7 km	MPC · JPL
609339	2005 AD_{61}	—	January 15, 2005	Kitt Peak	Spacewatch	·	1.3 km	MPC · JPL
609340	2005 AH_{61}	—	January 15, 2005	Kitt Peak	Spacewatch	·	1.7 km	MPC · JPL
609341	2005 AL_{64}	—	January 13, 2005	Kitt Peak	Spacewatch	VER	3.1 km	MPC · JPL
609342	2005 AB_{66}	—	December 20, 2004	Mount Lemmon	Mount Lemmon Survey	·	3.0 km	MPC · JPL
609343	2005 AO_{66}	—	January 13, 2005	Kitt Peak	Spacewatch	·	2.5 km	MPC · JPL
609344	2005 AW_{66}	—	January 13, 2005	Kitt Peak	Spacewatch	·	2.8 km	MPC · JPL
609345	2005 AW_{72}	—	January 15, 2005	Kitt Peak	Spacewatch	L5	8.2 km	MPC · JPL
609346	2005 AG_{76}	—	January 15, 2005	Kitt Peak	Spacewatch	·	1.5 km	MPC · JPL
609347	2005 AO_{76}	—	January 15, 2005	Kitt Peak	Spacewatch	·	650 m	MPC · JPL
609348	2005 AC_{78}	—	January 15, 2005	Kitt Peak	Spacewatch	(194)	1.8 km	MPC · JPL
609349	2005 AG_{78}	—	January 15, 2005	Kitt Peak	Spacewatch	·	1.1 km	MPC · JPL
609350	2005 AG_{79}	—	January 15, 2005	Kitt Peak	Spacewatch	·	640 m	MPC · JPL
609351	2005 AZ_{82}	—	January 8, 2005	Campo Imperatore	CINEOS	·	2.1 km	MPC · JPL
609352	2005 AE_{83}	—	January 13, 2005	Kitt Peak	Spacewatch	·	4.1 km	MPC · JPL
609353	2005 AJ_{83}	—	November 6, 2012	Nogales	M. Schwartz, P. R. Holvorcem	·	1.4 km	MPC · JPL
609354	2005 AO_{83}	—	October 25, 2012	Mount Lemmon	Mount Lemmon Survey	·	1.4 km	MPC · JPL
609355	2005 AR_{83}	—	January 6, 2005	Catalina	CSS	·	1.8 km	MPC · JPL
609356	2005 AU_{83}	—	January 13, 2005	Kitt Peak	Spacewatch	RAF	710 m	MPC · JPL
609357	2005 AA_{84}	—	January 13, 2005	Kitt Peak	Spacewatch	·	440 m	MPC · JPL
609358	2005 AB_{84}	—	March 31, 2012	Mount Lemmon	Mount Lemmon Survey	URS	3.1 km	MPC · JPL
609359	2005 AV_{84}	—	November 22, 2008	Socorro	LINEAR	·	1.4 km	MPC · JPL
609360	2005 AZ_{84}	—	December 20, 2004	Mount Lemmon	Mount Lemmon Survey	·	1.1 km	MPC · JPL
609361	2005 AL_{85}	—	August 24, 2003	Cerro Tololo	Deep Ecliptic Survey	·	1.4 km	MPC · JPL
609362	2005 BY	—	January 16, 2005	Kitt Peak	Spacewatch	HNS	1.2 km	MPC · JPL
609363 Sinelo	2005 BB_{1}	Sinelo	January 16, 2005	Uccle	P. De Cat	H	600 m	MPC · JPL
609364	2005 BT_{6}	—	January 16, 2005	Socorro	LINEAR	·	1.5 km	MPC · JPL
609365	2005 BW_{11}	—	January 17, 2005	Kitt Peak	Spacewatch	·	2.0 km	MPC · JPL
609366	2005 BC_{12}	—	January 17, 2005	Kitt Peak	Spacewatch	·	2.6 km	MPC · JPL
609367	2005 BY_{27}	—	January 5, 2002	Palomar	NEAT	H	650 m	MPC · JPL
609368	2005 BQ_{30}	—	January 16, 2005	Mauna Kea	Veillet, C.	·	3.7 km	MPC · JPL
609369	2005 BT_{30}	—	January 18, 2005	Kitt Peak	Spacewatch	·	620 m	MPC · JPL
609370	2005 BE_{34}	—	March 10, 2005	Mount Lemmon	Mount Lemmon Survey	THM	2.2 km	MPC · JPL
609371	2005 BV_{34}	—	January 15, 2005	Kitt Peak	Spacewatch	MAR	1.2 km	MPC · JPL
609372	2005 BG_{35}	—	January 16, 2005	Mauna Kea	Veillet, C.	THM	1.8 km	MPC · JPL
609373	2005 BR_{36}	—	January 16, 2005	Mauna Kea	Veillet, C.	·	1.3 km	MPC · JPL
609374	2005 BT_{36}	—	January 16, 2005	Mauna Kea	Veillet, C.	·	1.6 km	MPC · JPL
609375	2005 BL_{40}	—	January 15, 2005	Kitt Peak	Spacewatch	·	530 m	MPC · JPL
609376	2005 BO_{42}	—	January 16, 2005	Mauna Kea	Veillet, C.	·	1.1 km	MPC · JPL
609377	2005 BN_{43}	—	January 16, 2005	Mauna Kea	Veillet, C.	·	1.2 km	MPC · JPL
609378	2005 BT_{43}	—	January 16, 2005	Kitt Peak	Spacewatch	·	790 m	MPC · JPL
609379	2005 BY_{43}	—	January 16, 2005	Mauna Kea	Veillet, C.	·	2.6 km	MPC · JPL
609380	2005 BR_{45}	—	January 16, 2005	Mauna Kea	Veillet, C.	·	1.2 km	MPC · JPL
609381	2005 BU_{49}	—	January 8, 2011	Mount Lemmon	Mount Lemmon Survey	·	2.5 km	MPC · JPL
609382	2005 BN_{50}	—	August 28, 2006	Kitt Peak	Spacewatch	·	650 m	MPC · JPL
609383	2005 BO_{50}	—	October 17, 2007	Mount Lemmon	Mount Lemmon Survey	·	620 m	MPC · JPL
609384	2005 BW_{50}	—	October 15, 2009	Kitt Peak	Spacewatch	HYG	2.5 km	MPC · JPL
609385	2005 BX_{50}	—	December 14, 2015	Haleakala	Pan-STARRS 1	·	4.0 km	MPC · JPL
609386	2005 BN_{51}	—	January 16, 2005	Kitt Peak	Spacewatch	·	1.4 km	MPC · JPL
609387	2005 BO_{51}	—	December 1, 2008	Mount Lemmon	Mount Lemmon Survey	·	1.1 km	MPC · JPL
609388	2005 BT_{51}	—	January 19, 2005	Kitt Peak	Spacewatch	·	3.3 km	MPC · JPL
609389	2005 BU_{51}	—	November 26, 2014	Haleakala	Pan-STARRS 1	·	560 m	MPC · JPL
609390	2005 BV_{51}	—	January 19, 2005	Catalina	CSS	·	1.4 km	MPC · JPL
609391	2005 BW_{51}	—	April 30, 2012	Kitt Peak	Spacewatch	VER	2.3 km	MPC · JPL
609392	2005 BB_{52}	—	April 21, 2009	Mount Lemmon	Mount Lemmon Survey	·	550 m	MPC · JPL
609393	2005 BF_{52}	—	February 25, 2011	Mount Lemmon	Mount Lemmon Survey	VER	2.2 km	MPC · JPL
609394	2005 BL_{52}	—	February 27, 2014	Nogales	M. Schwartz, P. R. Holvorcem	·	1.3 km	MPC · JPL
609395	2005 BN_{52}	—	July 11, 2016	Haleakala	Pan-STARRS 1	EUN	930 m	MPC · JPL
609396	2005 BP_{52}	—	August 24, 2012	Kitt Peak	Spacewatch	(1547)	1.4 km	MPC · JPL
609397	2005 BU_{52}	—	January 17, 2005	Kitt Peak	Spacewatch	·	1.1 km	MPC · JPL
609398	2005 BX_{52}	—	April 5, 2014	Haleakala	Pan-STARRS 1	·	1.3 km	MPC · JPL
609399	2005 BZ_{52}	—	September 3, 2016	Mount Lemmon	Mount Lemmon Survey	HNS	1.1 km	MPC · JPL
609400	2005 BK_{53}	—	March 4, 2012	Mount Lemmon	Mount Lemmon Survey	·	640 m	MPC · JPL

== 609401–609500 ==
back to top

Designation			Discovery			Properties		Ref
Permanent	Provisional	Named after	Date	Site	Discoverer(s)	Category	Diam.	Ref
609401	2005 BN_{53}	—	January 18, 2012	Mount Lemmon	Mount Lemmon Survey	·	570 m	MPC · JPL
609402	2005 BV_{53}	—	February 24, 2014	Haleakala	Pan-STARRS 1	EUN	880 m	MPC · JPL
609403	2005 BZ_{53}	—	January 17, 2005	Kitt Peak	Spacewatch	·	1.3 km	MPC · JPL
609404	2005 BL_{54}	—	August 1, 2016	Haleakala	Pan-STARRS 1	·	1.2 km	MPC · JPL
609405	2005 BR_{54}	—	January 15, 2018	Mount Lemmon	Mount Lemmon Survey	EUN	910 m	MPC · JPL
609406	2005 BX_{54}	—	March 7, 2017	Mount Lemmon	Mount Lemmon Survey	·	2.4 km	MPC · JPL
609407	2005 BB_{55}	—	February 26, 2014	Haleakala	Pan-STARRS 1	MIS	2.0 km	MPC · JPL
609408	2005 BK_{55}	—	January 18, 2005	Kitt Peak	Spacewatch	·	880 m	MPC · JPL
609409	2005 BU_{55}	—	November 19, 2008	Mount Lemmon	Mount Lemmon Survey	·	880 m	MPC · JPL
609410	2005 BZ_{55}	—	January 17, 2005	Kitt Peak	Spacewatch	·	1.3 km	MPC · JPL
609411	2005 BK_{56}	—	January 17, 2005	Kitt Peak	Spacewatch	·	1.6 km	MPC · JPL
609412	2005 CM_{1}	—	January 15, 2005	Kitt Peak	Spacewatch	(194)	1.5 km	MPC · JPL
609413	2005 CR_{5}	—	February 1, 2005	Palomar	NEAT	·	1.4 km	MPC · JPL
609414	2005 CC_{7}	—	January 13, 2005	Kitt Peak	Spacewatch	JUN	970 m	MPC · JPL
609415	2005 CE_{8}	—	January 6, 2005	Catalina	CSS	·	2.3 km	MPC · JPL
609416	2005 CG_{27}	—	February 2, 2005	Kitt Peak	Spacewatch	T_{j} (2.98) · EUP	3.2 km	MPC · JPL
609417	2005 CE_{28}	—	February 1, 2005	Kitt Peak	Spacewatch	·	1.3 km	MPC · JPL
609418	2005 CS_{30}	—	February 1, 2005	Kitt Peak	Spacewatch	·	1.4 km	MPC · JPL
609419	2005 CL_{32}	—	February 1, 2005	Kitt Peak	Spacewatch	·	460 m	MPC · JPL
609420	2005 CX_{32}	—	January 16, 2005	Kitt Peak	Spacewatch	HYG	2.3 km	MPC · JPL
609421	2005 CO_{35}	—	February 2, 2005	Socorro	LINEAR	·	1.7 km	MPC · JPL
609422	2005 CG_{37}	—	December 20, 2004	Mount Lemmon	Mount Lemmon Survey	·	1.3 km	MPC · JPL
609423	2005 CG_{38}	—	January 13, 2005	Kitt Peak	Spacewatch	·	950 m	MPC · JPL
609424	2005 CN_{56}	—	February 9, 2005	Kitt Peak	Spacewatch	·	1.5 km	MPC · JPL
609425	2005 CA_{61}	—	February 9, 2005	Mount Lemmon	Mount Lemmon Survey	·	1.4 km	MPC · JPL
609426	2005 CA_{69}	—	January 26, 2001	Kitt Peak	Spacewatch	·	650 m	MPC · JPL
609427	2005 CC_{73}	—	February 1, 2005	Kitt Peak	Spacewatch	·	940 m	MPC · JPL
609428	2005 CQ_{74}	—	February 2, 2005	Kitt Peak	Spacewatch	(2076)	550 m	MPC · JPL
609429	2005 CU_{76}	—	February 4, 2005	Mount Lemmon	Mount Lemmon Survey	·	1.4 km	MPC · JPL
609430	2005 CY_{77}	—	March 13, 2011	Mount Lemmon	Mount Lemmon Survey	TIR	2.3 km	MPC · JPL
609431	2005 CY_{81}	—	February 2, 2005	Catalina	CSS	·	1.3 km	MPC · JPL
609432	2005 CG_{82}	—	February 2, 2005	Kitt Peak	Spacewatch	·	670 m	MPC · JPL
609433	2005 CH_{82}	—	February 9, 2005	Kitt Peak	Spacewatch	HNS	1.1 km	MPC · JPL
609434	2005 CU_{82}	—	February 26, 2014	Mount Lemmon	Mount Lemmon Survey	·	1.7 km	MPC · JPL
609435	2005 CG_{83}	—	July 10, 2016	Mount Lemmon	Mount Lemmon Survey	JUN	940 m	MPC · JPL
609436	2005 CJ_{83}	—	August 3, 2013	Haleakala	Pan-STARRS 1	·	3.0 km	MPC · JPL
609437	2005 CL_{83}	—	August 27, 2016	Haleakala	Pan-STARRS 1	·	1.3 km	MPC · JPL
609438	2005 CU_{83}	—	February 14, 2005	Kitt Peak	Spacewatch	HNS	1.0 km	MPC · JPL
609439	2005 CW_{83}	—	October 10, 2016	Haleakala	Pan-STARRS 1	HNS	960 m	MPC · JPL
609440	2005 CY_{83}	—	February 4, 2005	Kitt Peak	Spacewatch	·	2.4 km	MPC · JPL
609441	2005 CP_{84}	—	April 5, 2011	Catalina	CSS	·	2.4 km	MPC · JPL
609442	2005 CQ_{84}	—	February 4, 2005	Kitt Peak	Spacewatch	EUN	700 m	MPC · JPL
609443	2005 CS_{84}	—	January 2, 2009	Mount Lemmon	Mount Lemmon Survey	·	1.6 km	MPC · JPL
609444	2005 CW_{84}	—	October 9, 2016	Haleakala	Pan-STARRS 1	·	1.4 km	MPC · JPL
609445	2005 CA_{85}	—	February 9, 2005	Mount Lemmon	Mount Lemmon Survey	·	2.7 km	MPC · JPL
609446	2005 CE_{85}	—	January 1, 2009	Kitt Peak	Spacewatch	·	1.2 km	MPC · JPL
609447	2005 CN_{85}	—	January 4, 2017	Haleakala	Pan-STARRS 1	·	3.2 km	MPC · JPL
609448	2005 CT_{85}	—	January 28, 2014	Kitt Peak	Spacewatch	AEO	980 m	MPC · JPL
609449	2005 CR_{86}	—	January 19, 2012	Haleakala	Pan-STARRS 1	(2076)	860 m	MPC · JPL
609450	2005 CB_{87}	—	November 8, 2007	Mount Lemmon	Mount Lemmon Survey	·	650 m	MPC · JPL
609451	2005 CK_{87}	—	January 27, 2017	Haleakala	Pan-STARRS 1	·	2.5 km	MPC · JPL
609452	2005 CS_{87}	—	December 21, 2008	Mount Lemmon	Mount Lemmon Survey	·	1.4 km	MPC · JPL
609453	2005 CA_{88}	—	December 21, 2008	Mount Lemmon	Mount Lemmon Survey	·	1.1 km	MPC · JPL
609454	2005 CO_{88}	—	December 20, 2004	Mount Lemmon	Mount Lemmon Survey	·	1.3 km	MPC · JPL
609455	2005 CG_{89}	—	February 14, 2005	Kitt Peak	Spacewatch	·	2.6 km	MPC · JPL
609456	2005 CO_{89}	—	February 9, 2005	Mount Lemmon	Mount Lemmon Survey	·	690 m	MPC · JPL
609457	2005 DA_{4}	—	January 9, 2016	Haleakala	Pan-STARRS 1	·	3.1 km	MPC · JPL
609458	2005 DH_{4}	—	February 4, 2005	Mount Lemmon	Mount Lemmon Survey	(116763)	1.6 km	MPC · JPL
609459	2005 DJ_{4}	—	July 19, 2015	Haleakala	Pan-STARRS 1	·	1.3 km	MPC · JPL
609460	2005 EV_{1}	—	March 1, 2005	Kitt Peak	Spacewatch	·	1.9 km	MPC · JPL
609461	2005 EX_{15}	—	March 3, 2005	Kitt Peak	Spacewatch	·	2.5 km	MPC · JPL
609462	2005 ET_{23}	—	March 3, 2005	Catalina	CSS	·	1.4 km	MPC · JPL
609463	2005 EZ_{23}	—	March 3, 2005	Catalina	CSS	·	540 m	MPC · JPL
609464	2005 ET_{45}	—	March 3, 2005	Catalina	CSS	·	650 m	MPC · JPL
609465	2005 EV_{52}	—	March 4, 2005	Kitt Peak	Spacewatch	·	1.7 km	MPC · JPL
609466	2005 EB_{58}	—	February 1, 2005	Kitt Peak	Spacewatch	·	740 m	MPC · JPL
609467	2005 EE_{61}	—	March 4, 2005	Catalina	CSS	·	1.7 km	MPC · JPL
609468	2005 EE_{64}	—	March 4, 2005	Mount Lemmon	Mount Lemmon Survey	·	710 m	MPC · JPL
609469	2005 EN_{64}	—	March 4, 2005	Mount Lemmon	Mount Lemmon Survey	·	3.1 km	MPC · JPL
609470	2005 EZ_{66}	—	March 4, 2005	Mount Lemmon	Mount Lemmon Survey	·	1.7 km	MPC · JPL
609471	2005 EE_{94}	—	March 3, 2005	Kitt Peak	Spacewatch	H	300 m	MPC · JPL
609472	2005 EX_{98}	—	March 3, 2005	Catalina	CSS	·	820 m	MPC · JPL
609473	2005 EA_{103}	—	March 4, 2005	Kitt Peak	Spacewatch	·	1.2 km	MPC · JPL
609474	2005 EZ_{107}	—	February 2, 2005	Kitt Peak	Spacewatch	·	1.4 km	MPC · JPL
609475	2005 EU_{108}	—	March 4, 2005	Catalina	CSS	·	1.7 km	MPC · JPL
609476	2005 EQ_{109}	—	February 9, 2005	Mount Lemmon	Mount Lemmon Survey	·	2.3 km	MPC · JPL
609477	2005 EB_{114}	—	March 4, 2005	Mount Lemmon	Mount Lemmon Survey	·	1.5 km	MPC · JPL
609478	2005 EC_{126}	—	March 8, 2005	Mount Lemmon	Mount Lemmon Survey	·	570 m	MPC · JPL
609479	2005 EK_{127}	—	March 4, 2005	Mount Lemmon	Mount Lemmon Survey	EUN	1.0 km	MPC · JPL
609480	2005 ER_{127}	—	March 9, 2005	Kitt Peak	Spacewatch	·	3.2 km	MPC · JPL
609481	2005 EB_{135}	—	March 9, 2005	Mount Lemmon	Mount Lemmon Survey	(13314)	1.8 km	MPC · JPL
609482	2005 ES_{135}	—	March 9, 2005	Mount Lemmon	Mount Lemmon Survey	·	1.6 km	MPC · JPL
609483	2005 EG_{144}	—	March 10, 2005	Mount Lemmon	Mount Lemmon Survey	HNS	1.0 km	MPC · JPL
609484	2005 EK_{145}	—	March 10, 2005	Mount Lemmon	Mount Lemmon Survey	·	1.7 km	MPC · JPL
609485	2005 EO_{150}	—	March 10, 2005	Kitt Peak	Spacewatch	·	970 m	MPC · JPL
609486	2005 EM_{154}	—	March 8, 2005	Mount Lemmon	Mount Lemmon Survey	·	420 m	MPC · JPL
609487	2005 ET_{174}	—	March 8, 2005	Kitt Peak	Spacewatch	·	1.5 km	MPC · JPL
609488	2005 EJ_{175}	—	March 8, 2005	Kitt Peak	Spacewatch	·	3.0 km	MPC · JPL
609489	2005 EC_{186}	—	March 10, 2005	Catalina	CSS	·	1.6 km	MPC · JPL
609490	2005 EW_{190}	—	March 11, 2005	Mount Lemmon	Mount Lemmon Survey	HYG	2.5 km	MPC · JPL
609491	2005 EJ_{191}	—	February 16, 2005	La Silla	A. Boattini	·	530 m	MPC · JPL
609492	2005 EB_{205}	—	March 11, 2005	Kitt Peak	Spacewatch	·	1.6 km	MPC · JPL
609493	2005 EY_{207}	—	January 17, 2005	Kitt Peak	Spacewatch	·	1.4 km	MPC · JPL
609494	2005 EM_{209}	—	March 4, 2005	Catalina	CSS	EUN	1.4 km	MPC · JPL
609495	2005 EE_{210}	—	March 4, 2005	Kitt Peak	Spacewatch	·	1.7 km	MPC · JPL
609496	2005 EN_{217}	—	March 9, 2005	Socorro	LINEAR	·	660 m	MPC · JPL
609497	2005 EL_{220}	—	March 11, 2005	Mount Lemmon	Mount Lemmon Survey	·	1.5 km	MPC · JPL
609498	2005 EO_{223}	—	March 11, 2005	Kitt Peak	Spacewatch	·	1.4 km	MPC · JPL
609499	2005 EC_{229}	—	February 1, 2005	Kitt Peak	Spacewatch	·	1.4 km	MPC · JPL
609500	2005 EA_{230}	—	March 10, 2005	Mount Lemmon	Mount Lemmon Survey	·	520 m	MPC · JPL

== 609501–609600 ==
back to top

Designation			Discovery			Properties		Ref
Permanent	Provisional	Named after	Date	Site	Discoverer(s)	Category	Diam.	Ref
609501	2005 EW_{231}	—	October 29, 2003	Kitt Peak	Spacewatch	(12739)	1.4 km	MPC · JPL
609502	2005 EK_{234}	—	March 10, 2005	Mount Lemmon	Mount Lemmon Survey	·	1.4 km	MPC · JPL
609503	2005 EA_{244}	—	March 11, 2005	Catalina	CSS	·	930 m	MPC · JPL
609504	2005 ET_{244}	—	March 11, 2005	Mount Lemmon	Mount Lemmon Survey	·	3.1 km	MPC · JPL
609505	2005 EY_{244}	—	March 11, 2005	Mount Lemmon	Mount Lemmon Survey	·	1.2 km	MPC · JPL
609506	2005 EB_{245}	—	March 11, 2005	Mount Lemmon	Mount Lemmon Survey	·	1.8 km	MPC · JPL
609507	2005 EF_{249}	—	March 13, 2005	Kitt Peak	Spacewatch	NEM	1.8 km	MPC · JPL
609508	2005 EA_{251}	—	March 2, 2005	Catalina	CSS	·	3.8 km	MPC · JPL
609509	2005 EZ_{258}	—	March 11, 2005	Mount Lemmon	Mount Lemmon Survey	LEO	1.4 km	MPC · JPL
609510	2005 EK_{265}	—	March 13, 2005	Kitt Peak	Spacewatch	·	1.7 km	MPC · JPL
609511	2005 EH_{274}	—	September 11, 2007	Mount Lemmon	Mount Lemmon Survey	·	1.3 km	MPC · JPL
609512	2005 EV_{291}	—	April 10, 2010	Kitt Peak	Spacewatch	·	1.6 km	MPC · JPL
609513	2005 EP_{304}	—	March 11, 2005	Kitt Peak	Deep Ecliptic Survey	·	2.6 km	MPC · JPL
609514	2005 ES_{324}	—	March 10, 2005	Mount Lemmon	Mount Lemmon Survey	·	1.2 km	MPC · JPL
609515	2005 EK_{326}	—	November 20, 2003	Kitt Peak	Spacewatch	·	3.4 km	MPC · JPL
609516	2005 EO_{331}	—	September 23, 2008	Kitt Peak	Spacewatch	·	2.3 km	MPC · JPL
609517	2005 EB_{334}	—	March 1, 2005	Catalina	CSS	·	1.4 km	MPC · JPL
609518	2005 EZ_{334}	—	January 21, 2012	Kitt Peak	Spacewatch	·	940 m	MPC · JPL
609519	2005 EC_{335}	—	March 13, 2005	Moletai	K. Černis, Zdanavicius, J.	HNS	1.2 km	MPC · JPL
609520	2005 EV_{335}	—	March 30, 2011	Haleakala	Pan-STARRS 1	·	2.8 km	MPC · JPL
609521	2005 ED_{336}	—	August 27, 2011	Haleakala	Pan-STARRS 1	AGN	910 m	MPC · JPL
609522	2005 EK_{336}	—	March 12, 2014	Haleakala	Pan-STARRS 1	·	1.4 km	MPC · JPL
609523	2005 EN_{336}	—	February 3, 2012	Haleakala	Pan-STARRS 1	·	760 m	MPC · JPL
609524	2005 ES_{336}	—	November 20, 2009	Kitt Peak	Spacewatch	THM	2.2 km	MPC · JPL
609525	2005 EX_{336}	—	April 1, 2016	Haleakala	Pan-STARRS 1	V	560 m	MPC · JPL
609526	2005 EA_{337}	—	February 1, 2009	Mount Lemmon	Mount Lemmon Survey	·	1.5 km	MPC · JPL
609527	2005 EE_{338}	—	March 9, 2011	Mount Lemmon	Mount Lemmon Survey	·	2.6 km	MPC · JPL
609528	2005 EC_{339}	—	March 3, 2005	Kitt Peak	Spacewatch	RAF	810 m	MPC · JPL
609529	2005 EE_{339}	—	January 10, 2014	Mount Lemmon	Mount Lemmon Survey	HNS	960 m	MPC · JPL
609530	2005 EL_{339}	—	February 27, 2014	Haleakala	Pan-STARRS 1	GEF	860 m	MPC · JPL
609531	2005 ER_{339}	—	July 15, 2013	Haleakala	Pan-STARRS 1	V	400 m	MPC · JPL
609532	2005 ET_{339}	—	September 19, 2014	Haleakala	Pan-STARRS 1	·	2.4 km	MPC · JPL
609533	2005 EM_{340}	—	July 21, 2006	Mount Lemmon	Mount Lemmon Survey	·	690 m	MPC · JPL
609534	2005 EZ_{340}	—	March 8, 2005	Mount Lemmon	Mount Lemmon Survey	·	570 m	MPC · JPL
609535	2005 EB_{341}	—	September 3, 2010	Mount Lemmon	Mount Lemmon Survey	·	800 m	MPC · JPL
609536	2005 EF_{342}	—	February 26, 2012	Haleakala	Pan-STARRS 1	·	700 m	MPC · JPL
609537	2005 EN_{342}	—	January 10, 2016	Haleakala	Pan-STARRS 1	H	450 m	MPC · JPL
609538	2005 EZ_{343}	—	October 30, 2007	Mount Lemmon	Mount Lemmon Survey	AST	1.4 km	MPC · JPL
609539	2005 EF_{344}	—	August 10, 2016	Haleakala	Pan-STARRS 1	PAD	1.3 km	MPC · JPL
609540	2005 ER_{344}	—	September 15, 2007	Kitt Peak	Spacewatch	·	1.4 km	MPC · JPL
609541	2005 EA_{346}	—	December 9, 2015	Haleakala	Pan-STARRS 1	·	1.1 km	MPC · JPL
609542	2005 EB_{346}	—	August 27, 2011	Haleakala	Pan-STARRS 1	NEM	2.1 km	MPC · JPL
609543	2005 EY_{346}	—	July 14, 2013	Haleakala	Pan-STARRS 1	·	2.7 km	MPC · JPL
609544	2005 EF_{347}	—	December 18, 2007	Kitt Peak	Spacewatch	V	500 m	MPC · JPL
609545	2005 EJ_{347}	—	April 26, 2009	Kitt Peak	Spacewatch	NYS	690 m	MPC · JPL
609546	2005 ER_{348}	—	March 8, 2005	Mount Lemmon	Mount Lemmon Survey	NYS	730 m	MPC · JPL
609547	2005 FM_{3}	—	January 30, 2009	Mount Lemmon	Mount Lemmon Survey	·	1.3 km	MPC · JPL
609548	2005 FG_{7}	—	March 1, 2005	Kitt Peak	Spacewatch	·	1.4 km	MPC · JPL
609549	2005 FJ_{8}	—	March 10, 2005	Mount Lemmon	Mount Lemmon Survey	·	1.5 km	MPC · JPL
609550	2005 FC_{17}	—	September 15, 2006	Kitt Peak	Spacewatch	·	950 m	MPC · JPL
609551	2005 FP_{17}	—	October 4, 2007	Kitt Peak	Spacewatch	·	1.5 km	MPC · JPL
609552	2005 FF_{18}	—	November 4, 2007	Kitt Peak	Spacewatch	·	540 m	MPC · JPL
609553	2005 FP_{18}	—	January 29, 2012	Kitt Peak	Spacewatch	·	840 m	MPC · JPL
609554	2005 FQ_{18}	—	March 16, 2012	Haleakala	Pan-STARRS 1	·	840 m	MPC · JPL
609555	2005 FY_{18}	—	March 6, 2014	Kitt Peak	Spacewatch	·	1.2 km	MPC · JPL
609556	2005 GC_{4}	—	April 1, 2005	Kitt Peak	Spacewatch	NYS	930 m	MPC · JPL
609557	2005 GO_{16}	—	November 20, 2003	Kitt Peak	Spacewatch	·	2.6 km	MPC · JPL
609558	2005 GU_{17}	—	March 13, 2005	Kitt Peak	Spacewatch	·	2.6 km	MPC · JPL
609559	2005 GV_{36}	—	April 2, 2005	Mount Lemmon	Mount Lemmon Survey	·	640 m	MPC · JPL
609560	2005 GJ_{46}	—	April 5, 2005	Mount Lemmon	Mount Lemmon Survey	·	1.9 km	MPC · JPL
609561	2005 GH_{53}	—	April 2, 2005	Mount Lemmon	Mount Lemmon Survey	·	750 m	MPC · JPL
609562	2005 GC_{57}	—	April 6, 2005	Mount Lemmon	Mount Lemmon Survey	·	1.7 km	MPC · JPL
609563	2005 GE_{57}	—	April 6, 2005	Mount Lemmon	Mount Lemmon Survey	EUN	890 m	MPC · JPL
609564	2005 GA_{60}	—	April 6, 2005	Kitt Peak	Spacewatch	·	550 m	MPC · JPL
609565	2005 GR_{63}	—	March 15, 2005	Catalina	CSS	·	1.5 km	MPC · JPL
609566	2005 GJ_{67}	—	April 2, 2005	Mount Lemmon	Mount Lemmon Survey	·	1.5 km	MPC · JPL
609567	2005 GQ_{86}	—	April 4, 2005	Mount Lemmon	Mount Lemmon Survey	GEF	1.0 km	MPC · JPL
609568	2005 GY_{87}	—	March 11, 2005	Mount Lemmon	Mount Lemmon Survey	·	930 m	MPC · JPL
609569	2005 GK_{90}	—	April 6, 2005	Kitt Peak	Spacewatch	·	1.7 km	MPC · JPL
609570	2005 GA_{100}	—	March 16, 2005	Catalina	CSS	·	1.3 km	MPC · JPL
609571	2005 GR_{103}	—	April 2, 2005	Mount Lemmon	Mount Lemmon Survey	·	1.2 km	MPC · JPL
609572	2005 GB_{112}	—	March 18, 2005	Catalina	CSS	H	480 m	MPC · JPL
609573	2005 GG_{118}	—	March 9, 2005	Mount Lemmon	Mount Lemmon Survey	·	660 m	MPC · JPL
609574	2005 GF_{121}	—	September 14, 2007	Mount Lemmon	Mount Lemmon Survey	NEM	2.0 km	MPC · JPL
609575	2005 GT_{125}	—	March 11, 2005	Mount Lemmon	Mount Lemmon Survey	NYS	1.1 km	MPC · JPL
609576	2005 GO_{132}	—	April 2, 2005	Kitt Peak	Spacewatch	·	1.8 km	MPC · JPL
609577	2005 GO_{134}	—	April 10, 2005	Mount Lemmon	Mount Lemmon Survey	·	1.4 km	MPC · JPL
609578	2005 GH_{138}	—	April 12, 2005	Kitt Peak	Spacewatch	AEO	800 m	MPC · JPL
609579	2005 GV_{143}	—	April 10, 2005	Kitt Peak	Spacewatch	WIT	1.0 km	MPC · JPL
609580	2005 GG_{145}	—	August 18, 2002	Palomar	NEAT	·	1.5 km	MPC · JPL
609581	2005 GJ_{159}	—	April 12, 2005	Anderson Mesa	LONEOS	·	1.4 km	MPC · JPL
609582	2005 GY_{159}	—	April 12, 2005	Kitt Peak	Spacewatch	·	2.3 km	MPC · JPL
609583	2005 GH_{170}	—	April 12, 2005	Kitt Peak	Spacewatch	·	1.8 km	MPC · JPL
609584	2005 GC_{171}	—	April 12, 2005	Mount Lemmon	Mount Lemmon Survey	·	1.7 km	MPC · JPL
609585	2005 GO_{177}	—	April 5, 2005	Mount Lemmon	Mount Lemmon Survey	·	1.6 km	MPC · JPL
609586	2005 GS_{182}	—	April 1, 2005	Kitt Peak	Spacewatch	·	590 m	MPC · JPL
609587	2005 GV_{182}	—	April 12, 2005	Kitt Peak	Spacewatch	·	940 m	MPC · JPL
609588	2005 GA_{183}	—	March 4, 2005	Mount Lemmon	Mount Lemmon Survey	·	1.3 km	MPC · JPL
609589	2005 GN_{187}	—	March 8, 2005	Mount Lemmon	Mount Lemmon Survey	·	520 m	MPC · JPL
609590	2005 GX_{188}	—	March 16, 2005	Mount Lemmon	Mount Lemmon Survey	·	570 m	MPC · JPL
609591	2005 GS_{192}	—	March 8, 2005	Mount Lemmon	Mount Lemmon Survey	·	1.5 km	MPC · JPL
609592	2005 GQ_{198}	—	April 10, 2005	Kitt Peak	Deep Ecliptic Survey	NYS	900 m	MPC · JPL
609593	2005 GQ_{199}	—	April 10, 2005	Kitt Peak	Deep Ecliptic Survey	·	1.5 km	MPC · JPL
609594	2005 GU_{199}	—	April 10, 2005	Kitt Peak	Deep Ecliptic Survey	AST	1.3 km	MPC · JPL
609595	2005 GX_{200}	—	March 16, 2005	Kitt Peak	Spacewatch	HNS	1.1 km	MPC · JPL
609596	2005 GG_{201}	—	April 4, 2005	Mount Lemmon	Mount Lemmon Survey	·	1.4 km	MPC · JPL
609597	2005 GM_{201}	—	April 4, 2005	Mount Lemmon	Mount Lemmon Survey	AGN	950 m	MPC · JPL
609598	2005 GE_{203}	—	April 6, 2005	Mount Lemmon	Mount Lemmon Survey	MAS	480 m	MPC · JPL
609599	2005 GG_{215}	—	April 2, 2005	Kitt Peak	Spacewatch	·	1.2 km	MPC · JPL
609600	2005 GD_{226}	—	January 1, 2009	Kitt Peak	Spacewatch	·	1.4 km	MPC · JPL

== 609601–609700 ==
back to top

Designation			Discovery			Properties		Ref
Permanent	Provisional	Named after	Date	Site	Discoverer(s)	Category	Diam.	Ref
609601	2005 GH_{227}	—	April 5, 2005	Mount Lemmon	Mount Lemmon Survey	·	640 m	MPC · JPL
609602	2005 GH_{230}	—	April 1, 2005	Anderson Mesa	LONEOS	PHO	720 m	MPC · JPL
609603	2005 GQ_{230}	—	January 28, 2014	Mayhill-ISON	L. Elenin	·	1.9 km	MPC · JPL
609604	2005 GR_{230}	—	April 6, 2005	Kitt Peak	Spacewatch	MAS	640 m	MPC · JPL
609605	2005 GT_{230}	—	January 17, 2009	Kitt Peak	Spacewatch	·	1.3 km	MPC · JPL
609606	2005 GV_{230}	—	October 20, 2008	Mount Lemmon	Mount Lemmon Survey	·	2.5 km	MPC · JPL
609607	2005 GE_{231}	—	September 25, 2011	Haleakala	Pan-STARRS 1	·	1.9 km	MPC · JPL
609608	2005 GN_{231}	—	February 25, 2012	Kitt Peak	Spacewatch	·	700 m	MPC · JPL
609609	2005 GU_{231}	—	February 4, 2009	Mount Lemmon	Mount Lemmon Survey	NEM	2.0 km	MPC · JPL
609610	2005 GX_{231}	—	October 29, 2010	Mauna Kea	George, T., M. Micheli	·	850 m	MPC · JPL
609611	2005 GD_{232}	—	March 11, 2005	Mount Lemmon	Mount Lemmon Survey	·	960 m	MPC · JPL
609612	2005 GJ_{232}	—	November 20, 2008	Kitt Peak	Spacewatch	·	3.1 km	MPC · JPL
609613	2005 GM_{232}	—	April 6, 2005	Kitt Peak	Spacewatch	·	970 m	MPC · JPL
609614	2005 GP_{232}	—	April 2, 2014	Mount Lemmon	Mount Lemmon Survey	·	1.5 km	MPC · JPL
609615	2005 GQ_{232}	—	March 15, 2016	Haleakala	Pan-STARRS 1	·	940 m	MPC · JPL
609616	2005 GA_{233}	—	October 10, 2016	Mount Lemmon	Mount Lemmon Survey	·	1.5 km	MPC · JPL
609617	2005 GV_{233}	—	September 30, 2011	Kitt Peak	Spacewatch	BAR	1.0 km	MPC · JPL
609618	2005 GX_{233}	—	April 2, 2005	Kitt Peak	Spacewatch	·	1.9 km	MPC · JPL
609619	2005 GB_{234}	—	April 1, 2005	Kitt Peak	Spacewatch	·	790 m	MPC · JPL
609620	2005 GE_{234}	—	November 28, 2014	Haleakala	Pan-STARRS 1	V	490 m	MPC · JPL
609621	2005 GW_{234}	—	March 10, 2005	Mount Lemmon	Mount Lemmon Survey	·	660 m	MPC · JPL
609622	2005 GO_{236}	—	December 31, 2008	Kitt Peak	Spacewatch	·	1.2 km	MPC · JPL
609623	2005 GP_{236}	—	August 30, 2011	Haleakala	Pan-STARRS 1	·	1.7 km	MPC · JPL
609624	2005 GW_{238}	—	April 2, 2005	Catalina	CSS	JUN	920 m	MPC · JPL
609625	2005 GY_{238}	—	April 4, 2005	Mount Lemmon	Mount Lemmon Survey	·	1.5 km	MPC · JPL
609626	2005 HX_{10}	—	October 21, 2012	Haleakala	Pan-STARRS 1	·	1.6 km	MPC · JPL
609627	2005 HL_{11}	—	April 16, 2005	Kitt Peak	Spacewatch	·	1.7 km	MPC · JPL
609628	2005 HW_{11}	—	April 17, 2005	Kitt Peak	Spacewatch	·	1.6 km	MPC · JPL
609629	2005 HB_{12}	—	April 17, 2005	Kitt Peak	Spacewatch	·	860 m	MPC · JPL
609630	2005 HD_{12}	—	January 12, 2018	Haleakala	Pan-STARRS 1	·	1.1 km	MPC · JPL
609631	2005 HE_{12}	—	November 2, 2010	Mount Lemmon	Mount Lemmon Survey	·	770 m	MPC · JPL
609632	2005 HH_{12}	—	October 7, 2016	Mount Lemmon	Mount Lemmon Survey	·	1.6 km	MPC · JPL
609633	2005 JZ_{5}	—	May 4, 2005	Mauna Kea	Veillet, C.	·	1.5 km	MPC · JPL
609634	2005 JU_{8}	—	April 17, 2005	Kitt Peak	Spacewatch	·	1.4 km	MPC · JPL
609635	2005 JW_{11}	—	April 11, 2005	Mount Lemmon	Mount Lemmon Survey	·	620 m	MPC · JPL
609636	2005 JN_{13}	—	May 4, 2005	Mauna Kea	Veillet, C.	·	810 m	MPC · JPL
609637	2005 JX_{19}	—	May 4, 2005	Mount Lemmon	Mount Lemmon Survey	AGN	1.2 km	MPC · JPL
609638	2005 JZ_{39}	—	April 11, 2005	Mount Lemmon	Mount Lemmon Survey	AGN	1.1 km	MPC · JPL
609639	2005 JP_{47}	—	May 3, 2005	Kitt Peak	Spacewatch	·	840 m	MPC · JPL
609640	2005 JQ_{47}	—	May 3, 2005	Kitt Peak	Spacewatch	H	410 m	MPC · JPL
609641	2005 JE_{50}	—	May 4, 2005	Kitt Peak	Spacewatch	AGN	1.2 km	MPC · JPL
609642	2005 JW_{60}	—	May 8, 2005	Mount Lemmon	Mount Lemmon Survey	·	1.6 km	MPC · JPL
609643	2005 JA_{62}	—	April 4, 2005	Catalina	CSS	EUN	1.3 km	MPC · JPL
609644	2005 JC_{73}	—	May 8, 2005	Kitt Peak	Spacewatch	·	1.3 km	MPC · JPL
609645	2005 JK_{76}	—	May 9, 2005	Mount Lemmon	Mount Lemmon Survey	·	1.4 km	MPC · JPL
609646	2005 JW_{95}	—	May 8, 2005	Kitt Peak	Spacewatch	AST	1.4 km	MPC · JPL
609647	2005 JO_{101}	—	May 9, 2005	Mount Lemmon	Mount Lemmon Survey	·	930 m	MPC · JPL
609648	2005 JF_{115}	—	May 10, 2005	Mount Lemmon	Mount Lemmon Survey	·	1.6 km	MPC · JPL
609649	2005 JM_{115}	—	March 1, 2009	Kitt Peak	Spacewatch	·	1.7 km	MPC · JPL
609650	2005 JV_{124}	—	May 11, 2005	Mount Lemmon	Mount Lemmon Survey	·	1.1 km	MPC · JPL
609651	2005 JT_{128}	—	May 13, 2005	Kitt Peak	Spacewatch	·	930 m	MPC · JPL
609652	2005 JA_{129}	—	May 13, 2005	Kitt Peak	Spacewatch	·	1.7 km	MPC · JPL
609653	2005 JU_{152}	—	May 4, 2005	Kitt Peak	Spacewatch	MAS	630 m	MPC · JPL
609654	2005 JQ_{174}	—	April 10, 2005	Mount Lemmon	Mount Lemmon Survey	·	850 m	MPC · JPL
609655	2005 JK_{177}	—	April 9, 2005	Mount Lemmon	Mount Lemmon Survey	·	1.2 km	MPC · JPL
609656	2005 JL_{187}	—	May 8, 2005	Mount Lemmon	Mount Lemmon Survey	MAS	800 m	MPC · JPL
609657	2005 JM_{187}	—	March 15, 2012	Mount Lemmon	Mount Lemmon Survey	·	980 m	MPC · JPL
609658	2005 JA_{188}	—	October 29, 2010	Mount Lemmon	Mount Lemmon Survey	PHO	820 m	MPC · JPL
609659	2005 JC_{188}	—	May 10, 2005	Mount Lemmon	Mount Lemmon Survey	MAS	670 m	MPC · JPL
609660	2005 JF_{188}	—	May 18, 2014	Mount Lemmon	Mount Lemmon Survey	·	1.7 km	MPC · JPL
609661	2005 JG_{188}	—	March 8, 2016	Haleakala	Pan-STARRS 1	PHO	770 m	MPC · JPL
609662	2005 JZ_{188}	—	August 27, 2013	Haleakala	Pan-STARRS 1	·	1.1 km	MPC · JPL
609663	2005 JD_{189}	—	September 24, 2011	Haleakala	Pan-STARRS 1	·	1.6 km	MPC · JPL
609664	2005 JJ_{190}	—	January 11, 2008	Kitt Peak	Spacewatch	·	850 m	MPC · JPL
609665	2005 JR_{191}	—	May 11, 2005	Mount Lemmon	Mount Lemmon Survey	·	1.6 km	MPC · JPL
609666	2005 JA_{192}	—	February 9, 2008	Mount Lemmon	Mount Lemmon Survey	NYS	750 m	MPC · JPL
609667	2005 JH_{193}	—	October 17, 2007	Mount Lemmon	Mount Lemmon Survey	·	1.4 km	MPC · JPL
609668	2005 JM_{193}	—	November 26, 2014	Haleakala	Pan-STARRS 1	·	3.1 km	MPC · JPL
609669	2005 JB_{195}	—	May 15, 2005	Mount Lemmon	Mount Lemmon Survey	·	770 m	MPC · JPL
609670	2005 KC_{15}	—	May 17, 2005	Mount Lemmon	Mount Lemmon Survey	·	1.4 km	MPC · JPL
609671	2005 KG_{15}	—	February 20, 2009	Kitt Peak	Spacewatch	·	1.5 km	MPC · JPL
609672	2005 KM_{15}	—	May 15, 2005	Mount Lemmon	Mount Lemmon Survey	·	930 m	MPC · JPL
609673	2005 KW_{15}	—	September 4, 2011	Haleakala	Pan-STARRS 1	·	1.5 km	MPC · JPL
609674	2005 LX_{2}	—	June 2, 2005	Catalina	CSS	·	1.1 km	MPC · JPL
609675	2005 LW_{11}	—	June 3, 2005	Kitt Peak	Spacewatch	·	1.8 km	MPC · JPL
609676	2005 LD_{15}	—	June 8, 2005	Kitt Peak	Spacewatch	V	560 m	MPC · JPL
609677	2005 LP_{31}	—	June 8, 2005	Kitt Peak	Spacewatch	·	1.7 km	MPC · JPL
609678	2005 LK_{36}	—	May 10, 2005	Mount Lemmon	Mount Lemmon Survey	·	1.6 km	MPC · JPL
609679	2005 LQ_{36}	—	June 3, 2005	Catalina	CSS	·	840 m	MPC · JPL
609680	2005 LM_{37}	—	April 30, 2005	Kitt Peak	Spacewatch	·	1.0 km	MPC · JPL
609681	2005 LO_{37}	—	June 11, 2005	Kitt Peak	Spacewatch	·	2.2 km	MPC · JPL
609682	2005 LX_{43}	—	June 11, 2005	Kitt Peak	Spacewatch	·	2.2 km	MPC · JPL
609683	2005 LF_{44}	—	June 3, 2005	Kitt Peak	Spacewatch	(32418)	2.2 km	MPC · JPL
609684	2005 LN_{54}	—	October 21, 2006	Mount Lemmon	Mount Lemmon Survey	NYS	1.1 km	MPC · JPL
609685	2005 LU_{54}	—	March 16, 2012	Mount Lemmon	Mount Lemmon Survey	·	1.0 km	MPC · JPL
609686	2005 LX_{54}	—	June 11, 2005	Kitt Peak	Spacewatch	·	1 km	MPC · JPL
609687	2005 LY_{54}	—	November 11, 2006	Kitt Peak	Spacewatch	NYS	700 m	MPC · JPL
609688	2005 LA_{55}	—	January 22, 2013	Catalina	CSS	·	2.2 km	MPC · JPL
609689	2005 LM_{55}	—	April 18, 2012	Mount Lemmon	Mount Lemmon Survey	·	1.2 km	MPC · JPL
609690	2005 LO_{55}	—	February 22, 2012	Catalina	CSS	·	1.1 km	MPC · JPL
609691	2005 LV_{55}	—	February 12, 2008	Mount Lemmon	Mount Lemmon Survey	·	1.1 km	MPC · JPL
609692	2005 LM_{58}	—	June 13, 2005	Mount Lemmon	Mount Lemmon Survey	ERI	1.5 km	MPC · JPL
609693	2005 LZ_{58}	—	June 13, 2005	Mount Lemmon	Mount Lemmon Survey	NYS	850 m	MPC · JPL
609694	2005 MP_{2}	—	June 3, 2005	Kitt Peak	Spacewatch	·	890 m	MPC · JPL
609695	2005 ML_{3}	—	June 24, 2005	Palomar	NEAT	PHO	850 m	MPC · JPL
609696	2005 MS_{7}	—	June 27, 2005	Mount Lemmon	Mount Lemmon Survey	·	1.2 km	MPC · JPL
609697	2005 MQ_{24}	—	June 29, 2005	Palomar	NEAT	·	1.2 km	MPC · JPL
609698	2005 MR_{24}	—	May 19, 2005	Mount Lemmon	Mount Lemmon Survey	·	1.1 km	MPC · JPL
609699	2005 MU_{26}	—	June 29, 2005	Kitt Peak	Spacewatch	GAL	1.4 km	MPC · JPL
609700	2005 MN_{31}	—	June 30, 2005	Palomar	NEAT	·	2.6 km	MPC · JPL

== 609701–609800 ==
back to top

Designation			Discovery			Properties		Ref
Permanent	Provisional	Named after	Date	Site	Discoverer(s)	Category	Diam.	Ref
609701	2005 MK_{35}	—	June 30, 2005	Kitt Peak	Spacewatch	·	810 m	MPC · JPL
609702	2005 MU_{48}	—	June 29, 2005	Kitt Peak	Spacewatch	·	1.3 km	MPC · JPL
609703	2005 ML_{49}	—	June 30, 2005	Kitt Peak	Spacewatch	PHO	770 m	MPC · JPL
609704	2005 MD_{50}	—	June 30, 2005	Kitt Peak	Spacewatch	·	1.8 km	MPC · JPL
609705	2005 NW_{12}	—	March 16, 2004	Kitt Peak	Spacewatch	·	2.0 km	MPC · JPL
609706	2005 NN_{24}	—	July 4, 2005	Kitt Peak	Spacewatch	·	1.8 km	MPC · JPL
609707	2005 NO_{32}	—	July 5, 2005	Kitt Peak	Spacewatch	·	830 m	MPC · JPL
609708	2005 NU_{39}	—	July 1, 2005	Kitt Peak	Spacewatch	PHO	810 m	MPC · JPL
609709	2005 NL_{56}	—	July 5, 2005	Kitt Peak	Spacewatch	·	1.4 km	MPC · JPL
609710	2005 NS_{72}	—	July 7, 2005	Kitt Peak	Spacewatch	NYS	870 m	MPC · JPL
609711	2005 NC_{75}	—	July 10, 2005	Kitt Peak	Spacewatch	·	950 m	MPC · JPL
609712	2005 NN_{79}	—	July 6, 2005	Siding Spring	SSS	·	1.4 km	MPC · JPL
609713	2005 NK_{82}	—	July 5, 2005	Kitt Peak	Spacewatch	·	1.6 km	MPC · JPL
609714	2005 NT_{89}	—	March 11, 2008	Kitt Peak	Spacewatch	·	830 m	MPC · JPL
609715	2005 NS_{91}	—	July 5, 2005	Mount Lemmon	Mount Lemmon Survey	·	1.9 km	MPC · JPL
609716	2005 NB_{92}	—	July 5, 2005	Mount Lemmon	Mount Lemmon Survey	·	2.0 km	MPC · JPL
609717	2005 NE_{92}	—	July 5, 2005	Mount Lemmon	Mount Lemmon Survey	KOR	1.4 km	MPC · JPL
609718	2005 NY_{110}	—	July 7, 2005	Mauna Kea	Veillet, C.	·	1.5 km	MPC · JPL
609719	2005 NM_{114}	—	July 15, 2005	Mount Lemmon	Mount Lemmon Survey	MAS	690 m	MPC · JPL
609720	2005 NU_{114}	—	July 15, 2005	Mount Lemmon	Mount Lemmon Survey	BRA	1.3 km	MPC · JPL
609721	2005 NL_{115}	—	July 7, 2005	Mauna Kea	Veillet, C.	·	1.5 km	MPC · JPL
609722	2005 NL_{116}	—	July 7, 2005	Mauna Kea	Veillet, C.	·	870 m	MPC · JPL
609723	2005 NX_{124}	—	January 29, 2011	Mount Lemmon	Mount Lemmon Survey	·	1.3 km	MPC · JPL
609724	2005 NW_{125}	—	December 30, 2007	Kitt Peak	Spacewatch	AGN	1.4 km	MPC · JPL
609725	2005 NU_{126}	—	July 4, 2005	Mount Lemmon	Mount Lemmon Survey	V	560 m	MPC · JPL
609726	2005 NJ_{127}	—	July 5, 2005	Mount Lemmon	Mount Lemmon Survey	·	1.2 km	MPC · JPL
609727	2005 NS_{127}	—	February 10, 2008	Kitt Peak	Spacewatch	KOR	1.3 km	MPC · JPL
609728	2005 NX_{127}	—	June 29, 2015	Haleakala	Pan-STARRS 1	·	1.8 km	MPC · JPL
609729	2005 NM_{128}	—	March 31, 2009	Kitt Peak	Spacewatch	·	1.5 km	MPC · JPL
609730	2005 NQ_{128}	—	February 26, 2008	Mount Lemmon	Mount Lemmon Survey	NYS	1.2 km	MPC · JPL
609731	2005 NT_{128}	—	July 15, 2005	Kitt Peak	Spacewatch	·	1.1 km	MPC · JPL
609732	2005 NU_{128}	—	June 14, 2005	Mount Lemmon	Mount Lemmon Survey	·	1.1 km	MPC · JPL
609733	2005 NE_{129}	—	July 15, 2005	Mount Lemmon	Mount Lemmon Survey	·	800 m	MPC · JPL
609734	2005 NU_{129}	—	October 21, 2006	Kitt Peak	Spacewatch	·	1.6 km	MPC · JPL
609735	2005 NR_{130}	—	January 11, 2008	Kitt Peak	Spacewatch	·	1.5 km	MPC · JPL
609736	2005 NH_{131}	—	July 5, 2005	Mount Lemmon	Mount Lemmon Survey	·	1.9 km	MPC · JPL
609737	2005 NL_{131}	—	September 25, 2006	Mount Lemmon	Mount Lemmon Survey	KOR	1.1 km	MPC · JPL
609738	2005 NM_{131}	—	September 12, 2015	Haleakala	Pan-STARRS 1	·	1.7 km	MPC · JPL
609739	2005 NH_{132}	—	October 24, 2011	Kitt Peak	Spacewatch	NAE	1.8 km	MPC · JPL
609740	2005 NP_{132}	—	July 8, 2005	Kitt Peak	Spacewatch	·	1.1 km	MPC · JPL
609741	2005 NQ_{132}	—	July 5, 2005	Mount Lemmon	Mount Lemmon Survey	·	1.8 km	MPC · JPL
609742	2005 NS_{132}	—	July 3, 2005	Mount Lemmon	Mount Lemmon Survey	·	1.7 km	MPC · JPL
609743	2005 OA_{10}	—	July 4, 2005	Mount Lemmon	Mount Lemmon Survey	·	1.1 km	MPC · JPL
609744	2005 OG_{23}	—	July 30, 2005	Palomar	NEAT	·	2.1 km	MPC · JPL
609745	2005 OW_{30}	—	July 31, 2005	Mauna Kea	P. A. Wiegert, D. D. Balam	·	1.7 km	MPC · JPL
609746	2005 OK_{32}	—	July 28, 2005	Palomar	NEAT	NYS	1.1 km	MPC · JPL
609747	2005 OJ_{34}	—	June 21, 2014	Haleakala	Pan-STARRS 1	·	2.5 km	MPC · JPL
609748	2005 ON_{34}	—	November 1, 2013	Kitt Peak	Spacewatch	V	600 m	MPC · JPL
609749	2005 OB_{35}	—	July 30, 2005	Campo Imperatore	CINEOS	·	1.2 km	MPC · JPL
609750	2005 PM_{10}	—	August 4, 2005	Palomar	NEAT	·	1.6 km	MPC · JPL
609751	2005 PN_{17}	—	August 6, 2005	Siding Spring	SSS	·	2.7 km	MPC · JPL
609752	2005 PK_{29}	—	February 24, 2012	Mount Lemmon	Mount Lemmon Survey	MAS	800 m	MPC · JPL
609753	2005 PY_{29}	—	July 12, 2005	Mount Lemmon	Mount Lemmon Survey	·	820 m	MPC · JPL
609754	2005 PO_{32}	—	August 9, 2005	Cerro Tololo	Deep Ecliptic Survey	KOR	950 m	MPC · JPL
609755 Thelmazina	2005 QS_{11}	Thelmazina	August 27, 2005	Saint-Sulpice	B. Christophe	·	1.9 km	MPC · JPL
609756	2005 QT_{15}	—	August 25, 2005	Palomar	NEAT	H	390 m	MPC · JPL
609757	2005 QB_{17}	—	August 25, 2005	Palomar	NEAT	·	1.2 km	MPC · JPL
609758	2005 QV_{19}	—	August 25, 2005	Campo Imperatore	CINEOS	·	1.6 km	MPC · JPL
609759	2005 QU_{22}	—	August 27, 2005	Kitt Peak	Spacewatch	·	1.3 km	MPC · JPL
609760	2005 QS_{30}	—	August 28, 2005	St. Véran	St. Veran	·	910 m	MPC · JPL
609761	2005 QR_{58}	—	August 25, 2005	Palomar	NEAT	·	1.8 km	MPC · JPL
609762	2005 QF_{80}	—	August 28, 2005	Kitt Peak	Spacewatch	·	1.3 km	MPC · JPL
609763	2005 QN_{99}	—	August 30, 2005	Kitt Peak	Spacewatch	·	1.3 km	MPC · JPL
609764	2005 QN_{104}	—	August 31, 2005	Kitt Peak	Spacewatch	·	1.8 km	MPC · JPL
609765	2005 QB_{126}	—	August 28, 2005	Kitt Peak	Spacewatch	·	1.6 km	MPC · JPL
609766	2005 QW_{127}	—	August 28, 2005	Kitt Peak	Spacewatch	KOR	1.2 km	MPC · JPL
609767	2005 QZ_{132}	—	August 28, 2005	Kitt Peak	Spacewatch	·	1.8 km	MPC · JPL
609768	2005 QO_{138}	—	August 28, 2005	Kitt Peak	Spacewatch	KOR	1.5 km	MPC · JPL
609769	2005 QB_{144}	—	August 26, 2005	Palomar	NEAT	·	1.2 km	MPC · JPL
609770	2005 QV_{158}	—	August 27, 2005	Palomar	NEAT	·	1.6 km	MPC · JPL
609771	2005 QL_{159}	—	July 30, 2005	Palomar	NEAT	·	1.6 km	MPC · JPL
609772	2005 QL_{165}	—	September 3, 2005	Palomar	NEAT	·	1.1 km	MPC · JPL
609773	2005 QR_{170}	—	August 31, 2005	Anderson Mesa	LONEOS	H	510 m	MPC · JPL
609774	2005 QU_{179}	—	August 26, 2005	Palomar	NEAT	·	860 m	MPC · JPL
609775	2005 QM_{193}	—	August 28, 2005	Kitt Peak	Spacewatch	·	970 m	MPC · JPL
609776	2005 QG_{195}	—	February 16, 2015	Haleakala	Pan-STARRS 1	·	920 m	MPC · JPL
609777	2005 QE_{198}	—	March 1, 2008	Mount Lemmon	Mount Lemmon Survey	·	1.8 km	MPC · JPL
609778	2005 QK_{199}	—	August 31, 2005	Kitt Peak	Spacewatch	·	930 m	MPC · JPL
609779	2005 QR_{202}	—	January 30, 2017	Haleakala	Pan-STARRS 1	H	380 m	MPC · JPL
609780	2005 QN_{204}	—	August 27, 2005	Kitt Peak	Spacewatch	·	1.3 km	MPC · JPL
609781	2005 QN_{205}	—	August 27, 2005	Palomar	NEAT	·	1.8 km	MPC · JPL
609782	2005 QR_{205}	—	August 31, 2005	Kitt Peak	Spacewatch	·	1.8 km	MPC · JPL
609783	2005 QR_{206}	—	August 30, 2005	Kitt Peak	Spacewatch	·	740 m	MPC · JPL
609784	2005 RF_{16}	—	September 1, 2005	Kitt Peak	Spacewatch	KOR	1.2 km	MPC · JPL
609785	2005 RZ_{27}	—	July 12, 2005	Kitt Peak	Spacewatch	NYS	1.0 km	MPC · JPL
609786	2005 RU_{34}	—	September 3, 2005	Mauna Kea	Veillet, C.	·	1.5 km	MPC · JPL
609787	2005 RV_{51}	—	September 1, 2005	Kitt Peak	Spacewatch	·	1.0 km	MPC · JPL
609788	2005 RB_{53}	—	April 4, 2008	Mount Lemmon	Mount Lemmon Survey	V	590 m	MPC · JPL
609789	2005 RP_{53}	—	September 12, 2005	Kitt Peak	Spacewatch	·	1.2 km	MPC · JPL
609790	2005 RU_{57}	—	September 14, 2005	Kitt Peak	Spacewatch	·	620 m	MPC · JPL
609791	2005 RM_{58}	—	November 22, 2006	Kitt Peak	Spacewatch	KOR	1.4 km	MPC · JPL
609792	2005 RJ_{60}	—	September 13, 2005	Kitt Peak	Spacewatch	·	1.4 km	MPC · JPL
609793	2005 RK_{60}	—	September 14, 2005	Kitt Peak	Spacewatch	·	1.5 km	MPC · JPL
609794	2005 RM_{60}	—	September 1, 2005	Kitt Peak	Spacewatch	·	900 m	MPC · JPL
609795	2005 RW_{60}	—	September 13, 2005	Kitt Peak	Spacewatch	NYS	940 m	MPC · JPL
609796	2005 RH_{62}	—	September 13, 2005	Kitt Peak	Spacewatch	·	1.5 km	MPC · JPL
609797	2005 SA	—	September 16, 2005	Wrightwood	J. W. Young	H	490 m	MPC · JPL
609798	2005 SV_{34}	—	September 23, 2005	Kitt Peak	Spacewatch	·	1.2 km	MPC · JPL
609799	2005 SB_{40}	—	September 24, 2005	Kitt Peak	Spacewatch	·	1.4 km	MPC · JPL
609800	2005 SB_{61}	—	September 26, 2005	Kitt Peak	Spacewatch	·	1.3 km	MPC · JPL

== 609801–609900 ==
back to top

Designation			Discovery			Properties		Ref
Permanent	Provisional	Named after	Date	Site	Discoverer(s)	Category	Diam.	Ref
609801	2005 SC_{84}	—	September 24, 2005	Kitt Peak	Spacewatch	KOR	1.1 km	MPC · JPL
609802	2005 SP_{91}	—	September 24, 2005	Kitt Peak	Spacewatch	·	1.7 km	MPC · JPL
609803	2005 SX_{99}	—	September 25, 2005	Kitt Peak	Spacewatch	·	610 m	MPC · JPL
609804	2005 SR_{125}	—	September 29, 2005	Mount Lemmon	Mount Lemmon Survey	·	1.5 km	MPC · JPL
609805	2005 SQ_{127}	—	September 29, 2005	Mount Lemmon	Mount Lemmon Survey	KOR	1.2 km	MPC · JPL
609806	2005 SB_{128}	—	September 29, 2005	Mount Lemmon	Mount Lemmon Survey	NYS	960 m	MPC · JPL
609807	2005 SP_{136}	—	September 24, 2005	Kitt Peak	Spacewatch	·	1.3 km	MPC · JPL
609808	2005 SD_{186}	—	September 29, 2005	Mount Lemmon	Mount Lemmon Survey	·	800 m	MPC · JPL
609809	2005 SR_{196}	—	September 12, 2005	Kitt Peak	Spacewatch	KOR	1.1 km	MPC · JPL
609810	2005 SO_{197}	—	September 13, 2005	Kitt Peak	Spacewatch	·	1.4 km	MPC · JPL
609811	2005 SE_{203}	—	September 30, 2005	Mount Lemmon	Mount Lemmon Survey	·	860 m	MPC · JPL
609812	2005 SU_{208}	—	September 30, 2005	Mount Lemmon	Mount Lemmon Survey	·	1.4 km	MPC · JPL
609813	2005 ST_{224}	—	September 29, 2005	Mount Lemmon	Mount Lemmon Survey	·	730 m	MPC · JPL
609814	2005 SF_{277}	—	September 30, 2005	Kitt Peak	Spacewatch	·	840 m	MPC · JPL
609815	2005 SH_{283}	—	September 27, 2005	Apache Point	SDSS Collaboration	·	1.6 km	MPC · JPL
609816	2005 SG_{284}	—	September 27, 2005	Apache Point	SDSS Collaboration	·	1.5 km	MPC · JPL
609817	2005 SO_{286}	—	October 25, 2005	Apache Point	SDSS Collaboration	·	1.6 km	MPC · JPL
609818	2005 SB_{294}	—	September 30, 2005	Mauna Kea	A. Boattini	(5)	890 m	MPC · JPL
609819	2005 SO_{296}	—	December 26, 2011	Kitt Peak	Spacewatch	·	1.4 km	MPC · JPL
609820	2005 SN_{297}	—	February 22, 2012	Charleston	R. Holmes	·	2.0 km	MPC · JPL
609821	2005 SZ_{298}	—	October 12, 2016	Haleakala	Pan-STARRS 1	·	1.2 km	MPC · JPL
609822	2005 SO_{299}	—	September 29, 2005	Kitt Peak	Spacewatch	·	680 m	MPC · JPL
609823	2005 SX_{299}	—	September 30, 2005	Mauna Kea	A. Boattini	T_{j} (2.99) · 3:2 · (6124)	4.2 km	MPC · JPL
609824	2005 SV_{302}	—	September 30, 2005	Mount Lemmon	Mount Lemmon Survey	·	1.2 km	MPC · JPL
609825	2005 TQ_{7}	—	October 1, 2005	Kitt Peak	Spacewatch	·	1.5 km	MPC · JPL
609826	2005 TD_{8}	—	October 1, 2005	Kitt Peak	Spacewatch	KOR	1.0 km	MPC · JPL
609827	2005 TH_{14}	—	August 29, 2005	Palomar	NEAT	·	1.4 km	MPC · JPL
609828	2005 TR_{14}	—	August 27, 2005	Palomar	NEAT	·	1.3 km	MPC · JPL
609829	2005 TZ_{35}	—	October 1, 2005	Kitt Peak	Spacewatch	·	1.4 km	MPC · JPL
609830	2005 TH_{57}	—	October 1, 2005	Mount Lemmon	Mount Lemmon Survey	·	1.1 km	MPC · JPL
609831	2005 TO_{59}	—	October 2, 2005	Mount Lemmon	Mount Lemmon Survey	KOR	1.2 km	MPC · JPL
609832	2005 TX_{62}	—	October 4, 2005	Mount Lemmon	Mount Lemmon Survey	·	1.7 km	MPC · JPL
609833	2005 TR_{82}	—	October 3, 2005	Kitt Peak	Spacewatch	·	1.7 km	MPC · JPL
609834	2005 TS_{93}	—	October 6, 2005	Kitt Peak	Spacewatch	·	910 m	MPC · JPL
609835	2005 TC_{95}	—	September 25, 2005	Kitt Peak	Spacewatch	·	1.7 km	MPC · JPL
609836	2005 TO_{109}	—	October 7, 2005	Kitt Peak	Spacewatch	·	1.2 km	MPC · JPL
609837	2005 TY_{111}	—	September 27, 2005	Kitt Peak	Spacewatch	·	480 m	MPC · JPL
609838	2005 TG_{123}	—	April 26, 2000	Kitt Peak	Spacewatch	·	1.3 km	MPC · JPL
609839	2005 TO_{127}	—	October 7, 2005	Kitt Peak	Spacewatch	·	1.0 km	MPC · JPL
609840	2005 TL_{130}	—	October 7, 2005	Kitt Peak	Spacewatch	·	1.7 km	MPC · JPL
609841	2005 TQ_{142}	—	October 8, 2005	Kitt Peak	Spacewatch	NYS	1.3 km	MPC · JPL
609842	2005 TA_{144}	—	September 29, 2005	Kitt Peak	Spacewatch	KOR	1.6 km	MPC · JPL
609843	2005 TB_{149}	—	October 8, 2005	Kitt Peak	Spacewatch	EOS	1.3 km	MPC · JPL
609844	2005 TG_{184}	—	October 1, 2005	Mount Lemmon	Mount Lemmon Survey	·	1.4 km	MPC · JPL
609845	2005 TU_{186}	—	October 3, 2005	Kitt Peak	Spacewatch	·	1.8 km	MPC · JPL
609846	2005 TG_{198}	—	October 2, 2005	Mount Lemmon	Mount Lemmon Survey	3:2	4.5 km	MPC · JPL
609847	2005 TH_{198}	—	October 6, 2005	Mount Lemmon	Mount Lemmon Survey	3:2	3.9 km	MPC · JPL
609848	2005 TH_{199}	—	October 1, 2005	Mount Lemmon	Mount Lemmon Survey	·	1.7 km	MPC · JPL
609849	2005 TR_{199}	—	October 4, 2005	Mount Lemmon	Mount Lemmon Survey	·	1.7 km	MPC · JPL
609850	2005 TL_{200}	—	October 1, 2005	Kitt Peak	Spacewatch	·	940 m	MPC · JPL
609851	2005 TX_{201}	—	October 1, 2005	Kitt Peak	Spacewatch	·	1.9 km	MPC · JPL
609852	2005 TT_{202}	—	September 20, 2015	Mount Lemmon	Mount Lemmon Survey	·	1.9 km	MPC · JPL
609853	2005 TP_{203}	—	November 23, 2016	Mount Lemmon	Mount Lemmon Survey	·	1.7 km	MPC · JPL
609854	2005 TB_{205}	—	March 11, 2007	Anderson Mesa	LONEOS	·	1.2 km	MPC · JPL
609855	2005 TC_{206}	—	October 11, 2005	Kitt Peak	Spacewatch	·	1.4 km	MPC · JPL
609856	2005 TU_{207}	—	September 18, 2015	Mount Lemmon	Mount Lemmon Survey	EOS	1.4 km	MPC · JPL
609857	2005 TY_{207}	—	February 20, 2015	Haleakala	Pan-STARRS 1	·	1.1 km	MPC · JPL
609858	2005 TQ_{210}	—	October 5, 2013	Haleakala	Pan-STARRS 1	T_{j} (2.97)	2.9 km	MPC · JPL
609859	2005 TB_{211}	—	February 23, 2011	Kitt Peak	Spacewatch	·	1.1 km	MPC · JPL
609860	2005 TN_{212}	—	March 7, 2013	Mount Lemmon	Mount Lemmon Survey	EOS	1.5 km	MPC · JPL
609861	2005 TR_{214}	—	October 1, 2005	Mount Lemmon	Mount Lemmon Survey	3:2	3.8 km	MPC · JPL
609862	2005 TW_{214}	—	October 9, 2005	Kitt Peak	Spacewatch	·	1.3 km	MPC · JPL
609863	2005 TX_{215}	—	October 12, 2005	Kitt Peak	Spacewatch	·	1.3 km	MPC · JPL
609864	2005 TA_{216}	—	October 1, 2005	Mount Lemmon	Mount Lemmon Survey	·	1.5 km	MPC · JPL
609865	2005 TE_{217}	—	October 7, 2005	Mauna Kea	A. Boattini	VER	2.5 km	MPC · JPL
609866	2005 TJ_{219}	—	October 6, 2005	Mount Lemmon	Mount Lemmon Survey	·	1.7 km	MPC · JPL
609867	2005 TX_{220}	—	October 11, 2005	Kitt Peak	Spacewatch	·	1.8 km	MPC · JPL
609868	2005 TM_{221}	—	October 6, 2005	Mount Lemmon	Mount Lemmon Survey	·	1.9 km	MPC · JPL
609869	2005 UL_{7}	—	October 7, 2005	Catalina	CSS	H	570 m	MPC · JPL
609870	2005 UH_{11}	—	October 22, 2005	Kitt Peak	Spacewatch	EOS	1.5 km	MPC · JPL
609871	2005 UJ_{17}	—	October 3, 2005	Palomar	NEAT	·	2.7 km	MPC · JPL
609872	2005 UE_{26}	—	October 23, 2005	Kitt Peak	Spacewatch	·	2.2 km	MPC · JPL
609873	2005 US_{31}	—	October 24, 2005	Kitt Peak	Spacewatch	·	1.6 km	MPC · JPL
609874	2005 UC_{89}	—	October 22, 2005	Kitt Peak	Spacewatch	·	1.5 km	MPC · JPL
609875	2005 UV_{98}	—	October 22, 2005	Kitt Peak	Spacewatch	·	1.0 km	MPC · JPL
609876	2005 UT_{116}	—	October 23, 2005	Kitt Peak	Spacewatch	·	1.8 km	MPC · JPL
609877	2005 UF_{118}	—	October 24, 2005	Kitt Peak	Spacewatch	·	1.5 km	MPC · JPL
609878	2005 UH_{119}	—	October 24, 2005	Kitt Peak	Spacewatch	·	1.2 km	MPC · JPL
609879	2005 UY_{128}	—	October 24, 2005	Kitt Peak	Spacewatch	·	1.6 km	MPC · JPL
609880	2005 UR_{129}	—	October 24, 2005	Kitt Peak	Spacewatch	EOS	1.7 km	MPC · JPL
609881	2005 US_{138}	—	October 25, 2005	Kitt Peak	Spacewatch	·	1.7 km	MPC · JPL
609882	2005 UV_{184}	—	October 25, 2005	Mount Lemmon	Mount Lemmon Survey	·	630 m	MPC · JPL
609883	2005 UG_{201}	—	October 1, 2005	Mount Lemmon	Mount Lemmon Survey	EOS	1.4 km	MPC · JPL
609884	2005 UV_{201}	—	October 25, 2005	Kitt Peak	Spacewatch	·	1.7 km	MPC · JPL
609885	2005 UP_{203}	—	October 25, 2005	Mount Lemmon	Mount Lemmon Survey	EOS	1.4 km	MPC · JPL
609886	2005 UQ_{221}	—	October 25, 2005	Kitt Peak	Spacewatch	·	2.2 km	MPC · JPL
609887	2005 UY_{227}	—	October 25, 2005	Kitt Peak	Spacewatch	·	770 m	MPC · JPL
609888	2005 UY_{232}	—	October 25, 2005	Kitt Peak	Spacewatch	·	1.8 km	MPC · JPL
609889	2005 UM_{242}	—	October 25, 2005	Kitt Peak	Spacewatch	PHO	900 m	MPC · JPL
609890	2005 UA_{243}	—	October 25, 2005	Kitt Peak	Spacewatch	·	1.2 km	MPC · JPL
609891	2005 UJ_{244}	—	October 25, 2005	Kitt Peak	Spacewatch	·	2.4 km	MPC · JPL
609892	2005 UN_{244}	—	October 25, 2005	Kitt Peak	Spacewatch	·	1.4 km	MPC · JPL
609893	2005 UR_{244}	—	October 25, 2005	Kitt Peak	Spacewatch	·	1.1 km	MPC · JPL
609894	2005 UB_{259}	—	October 25, 2005	Kitt Peak	Spacewatch	V	590 m	MPC · JPL
609895	2005 UF_{269}	—	October 6, 2005	Mount Lemmon	Mount Lemmon Survey	·	1.6 km	MPC · JPL
609896	2005 UP_{271}	—	October 28, 2005	Mount Lemmon	Mount Lemmon Survey	·	2.0 km	MPC · JPL
609897	2005 UJ_{272}	—	October 28, 2005	Kitt Peak	Spacewatch	·	2.0 km	MPC · JPL
609898	2005 UX_{276}	—	October 24, 2005	Kitt Peak	Spacewatch	·	2.2 km	MPC · JPL
609899	2005 UU_{277}	—	October 24, 2005	Kitt Peak	Spacewatch	·	1.5 km	MPC · JPL
609900	2005 UT_{283}	—	October 26, 2005	Kitt Peak	Spacewatch	·	790 m	MPC · JPL

== 609901–610000 ==
back to top

Designation			Discovery			Properties		Ref
Permanent	Provisional	Named after	Date	Site	Discoverer(s)	Category	Diam.	Ref
609901	2005 UT_{290}	—	October 26, 2005	Kitt Peak	Spacewatch	3:2	4.5 km	MPC · JPL
609902	2005 UU_{293}	—	October 26, 2005	Kitt Peak	Spacewatch	·	940 m	MPC · JPL
609903	2005 UF_{297}	—	October 26, 2005	Kitt Peak	Spacewatch	KOR	1.2 km	MPC · JPL
609904	2005 UB_{304}	—	October 26, 2005	Kitt Peak	Spacewatch	·	1.6 km	MPC · JPL
609905	2005 UM_{312}	—	October 10, 2005	Catalina	CSS	·	300 m	MPC · JPL
609906	2005 US_{316}	—	October 26, 2005	Kitt Peak	Spacewatch	·	900 m	MPC · JPL
609907	2005 UX_{321}	—	October 27, 2005	Kitt Peak	Spacewatch	·	1.4 km	MPC · JPL
609908	2005 UB_{322}	—	October 27, 2005	Kitt Peak	Spacewatch	·	1.4 km	MPC · JPL
609909	2005 UW_{326}	—	October 1, 2005	Kitt Peak	Spacewatch	·	620 m	MPC · JPL
609910	2005 UZ_{330}	—	October 28, 2005	Kitt Peak	Spacewatch	EOS	1.3 km	MPC · JPL
609911	2005 UQ_{331}	—	October 29, 2005	Kitt Peak	Spacewatch	·	1.6 km	MPC · JPL
609912	2005 UX_{339}	—	October 31, 2005	Kitt Peak	Spacewatch	EOS	1.1 km	MPC · JPL
609913	2005 UE_{341}	—	October 31, 2005	Kitt Peak	Spacewatch	·	1.9 km	MPC · JPL
609914	2005 UL_{341}	—	October 31, 2005	Kitt Peak	Spacewatch	·	1.6 km	MPC · JPL
609915	2005 UM_{341}	—	October 31, 2005	Kitt Peak	Spacewatch	KOR	1.4 km	MPC · JPL
609916	2005 UM_{346}	—	October 26, 2005	Kitt Peak	Spacewatch	·	1.2 km	MPC · JPL
609917	2005 UX_{365}	—	October 27, 2005	Kitt Peak	Spacewatch	·	1.8 km	MPC · JPL
609918	2005 US_{372}	—	October 27, 2005	Mount Lemmon	Mount Lemmon Survey	·	1.5 km	MPC · JPL
609919	2005 UF_{378}	—	October 28, 2005	Mount Lemmon	Mount Lemmon Survey	·	1.1 km	MPC · JPL
609920	2005 UC_{386}	—	October 29, 2005	Mount Lemmon	Mount Lemmon Survey	·	1.3 km	MPC · JPL
609921	2005 UN_{387}	—	October 14, 2001	Kitt Peak	Spacewatch	·	1.0 km	MPC · JPL
609922	2005 UE_{401}	—	October 27, 2005	Kitt Peak	Spacewatch	·	1.5 km	MPC · JPL
609923	2005 UL_{401}	—	October 22, 2005	Kitt Peak	Spacewatch	·	1.6 km	MPC · JPL
609924	2005 US_{403}	—	October 29, 2005	Mount Lemmon	Mount Lemmon Survey	KOR	1.2 km	MPC · JPL
609925	2005 UT_{418}	—	October 25, 2005	Kitt Peak	Spacewatch	·	1.4 km	MPC · JPL
609926	2005 UW_{422}	—	September 30, 2005	Mount Lemmon	Mount Lemmon Survey	·	2.0 km	MPC · JPL
609927	2005 UL_{426}	—	October 28, 2005	Kitt Peak	Spacewatch	EOS	1.2 km	MPC · JPL
609928	2005 UT_{427}	—	October 28, 2005	Kitt Peak	Spacewatch	·	1.7 km	MPC · JPL
609929	2005 UZ_{428}	—	October 1, 2005	Mount Lemmon	Mount Lemmon Survey	·	1.5 km	MPC · JPL
609930	2005 UU_{453}	—	September 30, 2005	Mount Lemmon	Mount Lemmon Survey	·	650 m	MPC · JPL
609931	2005 UW_{453}	—	October 30, 2005	Mount Lemmon	Mount Lemmon Survey	·	1.4 km	MPC · JPL
609932	2005 UN_{473}	—	September 30, 2005	Mount Lemmon	Mount Lemmon Survey	·	1.1 km	MPC · JPL
609933	2005 UT_{473}	—	October 31, 2005	Mount Lemmon	Mount Lemmon Survey	EOS	1.2 km	MPC · JPL
609934	2005 UJ_{486}	—	October 23, 2005	Palomar	NEAT	·	2.3 km	MPC · JPL
609935	2005 UG_{506}	—	October 24, 2005	Mauna Kea	A. Boattini	VER	2.9 km	MPC · JPL
609936	2005 UQ_{507}	—	February 10, 2010	Kitt Peak	Spacewatch	MAR	1.0 km	MPC · JPL
609937	2005 UZ_{512}	—	October 25, 2005	Mount Lemmon	Mount Lemmon Survey	3:2	4.2 km	MPC · JPL
609938	2005 UG_{517}	—	October 30, 2005	Apache Point	SDSS Collaboration	EOS	1.2 km	MPC · JPL
609939	2005 UG_{520}	—	October 30, 2005	Apache Point	SDSS Collaboration	·	1.8 km	MPC · JPL
609940	2005 UR_{520}	—	October 27, 2005	Apache Point	SDSS Collaboration	3:2	4.9 km	MPC · JPL
609941	2005 UU_{520}	—	October 27, 2005	Apache Point	SDSS Collaboration	EOS	1.1 km	MPC · JPL
609942	2005 UG_{521}	—	November 1, 2005	Mount Lemmon	Mount Lemmon Survey	·	1.6 km	MPC · JPL
609943	2005 UP_{521}	—	October 30, 2005	Apache Point	SDSS Collaboration	·	1.2 km	MPC · JPL
609944	2005 UV_{523}	—	October 25, 2005	Apache Point	SDSS Collaboration	·	1.7 km	MPC · JPL
609945	2005 UK_{530}	—	October 25, 2005	Mount Lemmon	Mount Lemmon Survey	·	1.9 km	MPC · JPL
609946	2005 UK_{532}	—	January 24, 2015	Haleakala	Pan-STARRS 1	3:2 · SHU	3.6 km	MPC · JPL
609947	2005 UL_{536}	—	December 31, 2011	Mount Lemmon	Mount Lemmon Survey	·	1.6 km	MPC · JPL
609948	2005 UR_{536}	—	October 30, 2005	Kitt Peak	Spacewatch	·	660 m	MPC · JPL
609949	2005 US_{537}	—	October 24, 2005	Mauna Kea	A. Boattini	·	2.7 km	MPC · JPL
609950	2005 UW_{538}	—	February 17, 2007	Mount Lemmon	Mount Lemmon Survey	·	1.2 km	MPC · JPL
609951	2005 UO_{541}	—	March 18, 2013	Mount Lemmon	Mount Lemmon Survey	·	1.5 km	MPC · JPL
609952	2005 UE_{544}	—	October 23, 2005	Kitt Peak	Spacewatch	EOS	1.4 km	MPC · JPL
609953	2005 UJ_{546}	—	November 6, 2010	Kitt Peak	Spacewatch	NAE	1.7 km	MPC · JPL
609954	2005 UZ_{547}	—	October 31, 2005	Mauna Kea	A. Boattini	THM	2.0 km	MPC · JPL
609955	2005 UG_{549}	—	October 27, 2005	Mount Lemmon	Mount Lemmon Survey	·	980 m	MPC · JPL
609956	2005 UM_{549}	—	October 29, 2005	Catalina	CSS	·	1.8 km	MPC · JPL
609957	2005 UF_{550}	—	October 25, 2005	Kitt Peak	Spacewatch	·	1.9 km	MPC · JPL
609958	2005 UO_{550}	—	October 31, 2005	Kitt Peak	Spacewatch	EOS	1.6 km	MPC · JPL
609959	2005 UP_{550}	—	October 28, 2005	Mount Lemmon	Mount Lemmon Survey	·	1.5 km	MPC · JPL
609960	2005 UQ_{550}	—	October 27, 2005	Kitt Peak	Spacewatch	·	1.7 km	MPC · JPL
609961	2005 UX_{552}	—	October 26, 2005	Kitt Peak	Spacewatch	·	1.5 km	MPC · JPL
609962	2005 VC_{11}	—	November 3, 2005	Kitt Peak	Spacewatch	·	1.8 km	MPC · JPL
609963	2005 VZ_{12}	—	October 27, 2005	Kitt Peak	Spacewatch	·	1.8 km	MPC · JPL
609964	2005 VA_{14}	—	October 27, 2005	Catalina	CSS	EOS	2.0 km	MPC · JPL
609965	2005 VT_{26}	—	November 1, 2005	Kitt Peak	Spacewatch	EOS	1.5 km	MPC · JPL
609966	2005 VY_{27}	—	November 1, 2005	Kitt Peak	Spacewatch	·	1.5 km	MPC · JPL
609967	2005 VN_{30}	—	October 29, 2005	Mount Lemmon	Mount Lemmon Survey	·	2.3 km	MPC · JPL
609968	2005 VL_{38}	—	November 3, 2005	Mount Lemmon	Mount Lemmon Survey	·	1.4 km	MPC · JPL
609969	2005 VV_{40}	—	November 4, 2005	Mount Lemmon	Mount Lemmon Survey	TEL	1.0 km	MPC · JPL
609970	2005 VT_{47}	—	November 5, 2005	Kitt Peak	Spacewatch	·	1.7 km	MPC · JPL
609971	2005 VX_{48}	—	November 5, 2005	Mount Lemmon	Mount Lemmon Survey	·	1 km	MPC · JPL
609972	2005 VL_{55}	—	April 19, 2002	Kitt Peak	Spacewatch	·	2.1 km	MPC · JPL
609973	2005 VL_{56}	—	November 4, 2005	Kitt Peak	Spacewatch	·	560 m	MPC · JPL
609974	2005 VW_{62}	—	August 31, 2005	Kitt Peak	Spacewatch	·	1.2 km	MPC · JPL
609975	2005 VT_{63}	—	November 3, 2005	Kitt Peak	Spacewatch	·	1.4 km	MPC · JPL
609976	2005 VK_{64}	—	November 3, 2005	Kitt Peak	Spacewatch	·	1.7 km	MPC · JPL
609977	2005 VU_{64}	—	November 4, 2005	Kitt Peak	Spacewatch	·	1.7 km	MPC · JPL
609978	2005 VF_{67}	—	September 30, 2005	Mount Lemmon	Mount Lemmon Survey	·	1.8 km	MPC · JPL
609979	2005 VA_{72}	—	November 2, 2005	Mount Lemmon	Mount Lemmon Survey	·	2.2 km	MPC · JPL
609980	2005 VD_{73}	—	November 5, 2005	Kitt Peak	Spacewatch	·	1.0 km	MPC · JPL
609981	2005 VY_{82}	—	November 3, 2005	Mount Lemmon	Mount Lemmon Survey	·	850 m	MPC · JPL
609982	2005 VO_{83}	—	November 3, 2005	Mount Lemmon	Mount Lemmon Survey	·	1.5 km	MPC · JPL
609983	2005 VS_{83}	—	October 25, 2005	Kitt Peak	Spacewatch	·	1.6 km	MPC · JPL
609984	2005 VO_{86}	—	November 5, 2005	Kitt Peak	Spacewatch	·	1.6 km	MPC · JPL
609985	2005 VP_{89}	—	October 29, 2005	Kitt Peak	Spacewatch	·	2.2 km	MPC · JPL
609986	2005 VV_{90}	—	November 6, 2005	Kitt Peak	Spacewatch	·	1.7 km	MPC · JPL
609987	2005 VL_{105}	—	November 3, 2005	Mount Lemmon	Mount Lemmon Survey	·	520 m	MPC · JPL
609988	2005 VX_{105}	—	April 5, 2003	Kitt Peak	Spacewatch	·	2.6 km	MPC · JPL
609989	2005 VC_{116}	—	November 11, 2005	Kitt Peak	Spacewatch	EOS	1.6 km	MPC · JPL
609990	2005 VP_{120}	—	November 1, 2005	Catalina	CSS	PHO	960 m	MPC · JPL
609991	2005 VG_{123}	—	November 5, 2005	Mount Lemmon	Mount Lemmon Survey	·	1.8 km	MPC · JPL
609992	2005 VA_{129}	—	October 27, 2005	Kitt Peak	Spacewatch	EOS	1.8 km	MPC · JPL
609993	2005 VS_{129}	—	October 27, 2005	Apache Point	SDSS Collaboration	·	1.3 km	MPC · JPL
609994	2005 VM_{131}	—	October 30, 2005	Apache Point	SDSS Collaboration	·	1.2 km	MPC · JPL
609995	2005 VZ_{132}	—	October 30, 2005	Apache Point	SDSS Collaboration	EOS	1.1 km	MPC · JPL
609996	2005 VN_{137}	—	March 28, 2008	Mount Lemmon	Mount Lemmon Survey	3:2 · SHU	4.5 km	MPC · JPL
609997	2005 VY_{137}	—	November 1, 2005	Mount Lemmon	Mount Lemmon Survey	·	1.8 km	MPC · JPL
609998	2005 VF_{139}	—	November 6, 2005	Kitt Peak	Spacewatch	·	1.7 km	MPC · JPL
609999	2005 VH_{139}	—	October 10, 2012	Haleakala	Pan-STARRS 1	·	1.2 km	MPC · JPL
610000	2005 VW_{139}	—	November 1, 2005	Mount Lemmon	Mount Lemmon Survey	·	2.3 km	MPC · JPL

back to top

== Meaning of names ==
As minor planet discoveries are confirmed, they are given a permanent number by the IAU's Minor Planet Center (MPC), and the discoverers can then submit names for them, following the IAU's naming conventions. The list below concerns those minor planets in the specified number-range that have received names, and explains the meanings of those names.

Official naming citations of newly named small Solar System bodies are approved and published in a bulletin by IAU's Working Group for Small Bodies Nomenclature (WGSBN). Before May 2021, citations were published in MPC's Minor Planet Circulars for many decades. Recent citations can also be found on the JPL Small-Body Database (SBDB). Until his death in 2016, German astronomer Lutz D. Schmadel compiled these citations into the Dictionary of Minor Planet Names (DMP) and regularly updated the collection.

Based on Paul Herget's The Names of the Minor Planets, Schmadel also researched the unclear origin of numerous asteroids, most of which had been named prior to World War II. This article incorporates text from this source, which is in the public domain: SBDB New namings may only be added to this list below after official publication as the preannouncement of names is condemned. The WGSBN publishes a comprehensive guideline for the naming rules of non-cometary small Solar System bodies.

Named minor planet	Provisional	This minor planet was named for...	Ref · Catalog
609363 Sinelo	2005 BB_{1}	The name Sinelo is formed from the first letters of Sien (b. 2004), Nele (b. 2007), and Lore (b. 2007) De Cat, daughters of the discoverer and Titia Phalet.	IAU · 609363
609755 Thelmazina	2005 QS_{11}	Thelma Zina Christophe (b. 2013) is a granddaughter of the discoverer.	IAU · 609755
