= List of minor planets: 617001–618000 =

The following is a partial list of minor planets, running from minor-planet number 617001 through 618000, inclusive. The primary data for this and other partial lists is based on JPL's "Small-Body Orbital Elements" and data available from the Minor Planet Center. Critical list information is also provided by the MPC, unless otherwise specified from Lowell Observatory. A detailed description of the table's columns and additional sources are given on the main page including a complete list of every page in this series, and a statistical break-up on the dynamical classification of minor planets.

Also see the summary list of all named bodies in numerical and alphabetical order, and the corresponding naming citations for the number range of this particular list. New namings may only be added to this list after official publication, as the preannouncement of names is condemned by the Working Group for Small Bodies Nomenclature of the International Astronomical Union.

Near-Earth obj.	MBA (inner)	MBA (outer)	Centaur
Mars-crosser	MBA (middle)	Jupiter trojan	Trans-Neptunian obj.
Unclassified

== 617001–617100 ==
Designation			Discovery			Properties		Ref
Permanent	Provisional	Named after	Date	Site	Discoverer(s)	Category	Diam.	Ref
617001	2002 QG_{53}	—	August 29, 2002	Palomar	NEAT	·	940 m	MPC · JPL
617002	2002 QH_{71}	—	August 30, 2002	Palomar	NEAT	·	600 m	MPC · JPL
617003	2002 QA_{81}	—	August 19, 2002	Palomar	NEAT	·	950 m	MPC · JPL
617004	2002 QW_{94}	—	August 18, 2002	Palomar	NEAT	·	700 m	MPC · JPL
617005	2002 QJ_{98}	—	August 18, 2002	Palomar	NEAT	·	740 m	MPC · JPL
617006	2002 QE_{104}	—	August 26, 2002	Palomar	NEAT	·	460 m	MPC · JPL
617007	2002 QK_{105}	—	August 12, 2002	Cerro Tololo	Deep Ecliptic Survey	·	1.1 km	MPC · JPL
617008	2002 QL_{120}	—	August 30, 2002	Palomar	NEAT	·	1.9 km	MPC · JPL
617009	2002 QU_{125}	—	August 29, 2002	Palomar	NEAT	(5)	1.0 km	MPC · JPL
617010	2002 QW_{126}	—	August 30, 2002	Palomar	NEAT	·	760 m	MPC · JPL
617011	2002 QS_{135}	—	August 30, 2002	Palomar	NEAT	·	580 m	MPC · JPL
617012	2002 QZ_{141}	—	September 14, 2006	Kitt Peak	Spacewatch	·	900 m	MPC · JPL
617013	2002 QZ_{142}	—	October 30, 2002	Apache Point	SDSS Collaboration	EOS	1.9 km	MPC · JPL
617014	2002 QW_{145}	—	September 11, 2007	Kitt Peak	Spacewatch	KOR	1.5 km	MPC · JPL
617015	2002 QR_{148}	—	August 29, 2002	Palomar	NEAT	·	1.3 km	MPC · JPL
617016	2002 QU_{148}	—	August 30, 2002	Palomar	NEAT	·	870 m	MPC · JPL
617017	2002 QL_{151}	—	August 28, 2002	Palomar	NEAT	·	930 m	MPC · JPL
617018	2002 QQ_{151}	—	November 10, 2009	Kitt Peak	Spacewatch	·	550 m	MPC · JPL
617019	2002 QO_{152}	—	August 30, 2002	Palomar	NEAT	·	1 km	MPC · JPL
617020	2002 QE_{153}	—	October 23, 2009	Kitt Peak	Spacewatch	·	640 m	MPC · JPL
617021	2002 QB_{154}	—	February 17, 2010	Kitt Peak	Spacewatch	·	2.7 km	MPC · JPL
617022	2002 QP_{157}	—	November 19, 2009	Mount Lemmon	Mount Lemmon Survey	·	550 m	MPC · JPL
617023	2002 QJ_{158}	—	April 3, 2016	Haleakala	Pan-STARRS 1	·	1.6 km	MPC · JPL
617024	2002 RJ_{72}	—	September 5, 2002	Socorro	LINEAR	·	1.2 km	MPC · JPL
617025	2002 RS_{164}	—	September 12, 2002	Palomar	NEAT	·	1.2 km	MPC · JPL
617026	2002 RF_{195}	—	September 12, 2002	Palomar	NEAT	·	1.0 km	MPC · JPL
617027	2002 RG_{197}	—	September 13, 2002	Palomar	NEAT	(5)	1.2 km	MPC · JPL
617028	2002 RH_{254}	—	March 11, 2005	Mount Lemmon	Mount Lemmon Survey	KOR	1.2 km	MPC · JPL
617029	2002 RU_{274}	—	November 23, 2006	Kitt Peak	Spacewatch	·	620 m	MPC · JPL
617030	2002 RM_{275}	—	September 12, 2002	Palomar	NEAT	·	770 m	MPC · JPL
617031	2002 RB_{284}	—	September 10, 2007	Mount Lemmon	Mount Lemmon Survey	·	1.8 km	MPC · JPL
617032	2002 RE_{290}	—	September 4, 2002	Palomar	NEAT	·	2.1 km	MPC · JPL
617033	2002 RH_{298}	—	August 17, 2006	Palomar	NEAT	·	1.6 km	MPC · JPL
617034	2002 SN_{59}	—	September 3, 2002	Campo Imperatore	CINEOS	·	1.9 km	MPC · JPL
617035	2002 SM_{63}	—	September 27, 2002	Palomar	NEAT	·	600 m	MPC · JPL
617036	2002 SU_{75}	—	September 12, 2007	Kitt Peak	Spacewatch	·	1.7 km	MPC · JPL
617037	2002 TH_{61}	—	October 3, 2002	Campo Imperatore	CINEOS	·	1.8 km	MPC · JPL
617038	2002 TA_{93}	—	October 2, 2002	Socorro	LINEAR	·	1.6 km	MPC · JPL
617039	2002 TO_{116}	—	October 3, 2002	Palomar	NEAT	·	2.3 km	MPC · JPL
617040	2002 TM_{140}	—	October 5, 2002	Palomar	NEAT	·	1.9 km	MPC · JPL
617041	2002 TM_{147}	—	October 4, 2002	Palomar	NEAT	·	660 m	MPC · JPL
617042	2002 TJ_{150}	—	October 5, 2002	Palomar	NEAT	·	2.2 km	MPC · JPL
617043	2002 TR_{152}	—	October 5, 2002	Palomar	NEAT	·	1.4 km	MPC · JPL
617044	2002 TX_{155}	—	October 5, 2002	Kitt Peak	Spacewatch	·	980 m	MPC · JPL
617045	2002 TF_{162}	—	October 5, 2002	Palomar	NEAT	·	1.9 km	MPC · JPL
617046	2002 TX_{204}	—	October 4, 2002	Socorro	LINEAR	(5)	1.2 km	MPC · JPL
617047	2002 TP_{377}	—	October 4, 2002	Palomar	NEAT	·	1.1 km	MPC · JPL
617048	2002 TB_{380}	—	October 6, 2002	Palomar	NEAT	·	570 m	MPC · JPL
617049	2002 TF_{387}	—	March 19, 2009	Mount Lemmon	Mount Lemmon Survey	H	510 m	MPC · JPL
617050	2002 TT_{391}	—	January 2, 2012	Kitt Peak	Spacewatch	EUN	1.1 km	MPC · JPL
617051	2002 TX_{391}	—	January 6, 2010	Kitt Peak	Spacewatch	·	3.2 km	MPC · JPL
617052	2002 TZ_{391}	—	September 18, 2009	Mount Lemmon	Mount Lemmon Survey	·	690 m	MPC · JPL
617053	2002 TA_{392}	—	October 23, 2009	Mount Lemmon	Mount Lemmon Survey	·	480 m	MPC · JPL
617054	2002 UO_{1}	—	September 6, 2002	Campo Imperatore	CINEOS	·	1.2 km	MPC · JPL
617055	2002 UU_{14}	—	October 15, 2002	Palomar	NEAT	(1547)	1.3 km	MPC · JPL
617056	2002 UY_{29}	—	October 30, 2002	Kitt Peak	Spacewatch	·	1 km	MPC · JPL
617057	2002 UF_{80}	—	September 17, 2006	Catalina	CSS	(5)	970 m	MPC · JPL
617058	2002 UW_{80}	—	December 27, 2006	Mount Lemmon	Mount Lemmon Survey	V	600 m	MPC · JPL
617059	2002 UA_{81}	—	September 2, 2010	Mount Lemmon	Mount Lemmon Survey	KON	2.1 km	MPC · JPL
617060	2002 UM_{81}	—	August 29, 2006	Kitt Peak	Spacewatch	(5)	970 m	MPC · JPL
617061	2002 VG_{65}	—	November 2, 2002	Haleakala	NEAT	·	540 m	MPC · JPL
617062	2002 VP_{123}	—	November 14, 2002	Palomar	NEAT	·	2.1 km	MPC · JPL
617063	2002 VA_{145}	—	November 4, 2002	Palomar	NEAT	·	1.2 km	MPC · JPL
617064	2002 VJ_{150}	—	March 27, 2004	Anderson Mesa	LONEOS	·	910 m	MPC · JPL
617065	2002 VQ_{151}	—	January 2, 2012	Mount Lemmon	Mount Lemmon Survey	EUN	1.0 km	MPC · JPL
617066	2002 VY_{153}	—	April 6, 2008	Kitt Peak	Spacewatch	L5	7.6 km	MPC · JPL
617067	2002 WV_{22}	—	November 24, 2002	Palomar	NEAT	·	1.4 km	MPC · JPL
617068	2002 WN_{28}	—	November 16, 2002	Palomar	NEAT	·	1.7 km	MPC · JPL
617069	2002 WO_{28}	—	November 24, 2002	Palomar	NEAT	·	2.5 km	MPC · JPL
617070	2002 WQ_{31}	—	November 23, 2002	Palomar	NEAT	·	1.5 km	MPC · JPL
617071	2002 WH_{32}	—	July 19, 2007	Siding Spring	SSS	T_{j} (2.96)	2.9 km	MPC · JPL
617072	2002 WT_{32}	—	December 9, 2015	Haleakala	Pan-STARRS 1	H	540 m	MPC · JPL
617073	2002 XA_{46}	—	December 6, 2002	Socorro	LINEAR	H	690 m	MPC · JPL
617074	2002 XO_{53}	—	December 10, 2002	Palomar	NEAT	·	2.6 km	MPC · JPL
617075	2002 XH_{109}	—	November 24, 2002	Palomar	NEAT	·	1.3 km	MPC · JPL
617076	2002 XE_{117}	—	December 10, 2002	Palomar	NEAT	·	840 m	MPC · JPL
617077	2002 XV_{121}	—	March 13, 2011	Mount Lemmon	Mount Lemmon Survey	·	760 m	MPC · JPL
617078	2002 XP_{122}	—	October 17, 2012	Mount Lemmon	Mount Lemmon Survey	EOS	1.6 km	MPC · JPL
617079	2002 XG_{124}	—	December 29, 2011	Mount Lemmon	Mount Lemmon Survey	·	1.2 km	MPC · JPL
617080 Nögel	2002 YH_{36}	Nögel	January 1, 2003	La Silla	F. Hormuth	·	2.2 km	MPC · JPL
617081	2003 AH_{51}	—	January 5, 2003	Socorro	LINEAR	·	3.7 km	MPC · JPL
617082	2003 BQ_{42}	—	January 28, 2003	Haleakala	NEAT	·	1.8 km	MPC · JPL
617083	2003 BC_{47}	—	January 29, 2003	Palomar	NEAT	·	2.4 km	MPC · JPL
617084	2003 BG_{72}	—	January 28, 2003	Palomar	NEAT	JUN	1.1 km	MPC · JPL
617085	2003 BR_{86}	—	January 26, 2003	Anderson Mesa	LONEOS	ADE	2.4 km	MPC · JPL
617086	2003 BR_{95}	—	July 19, 2005	Palomar	NEAT	·	2.0 km	MPC · JPL
617087	2003 BY_{95}	—	January 30, 2014	Kitt Peak	Spacewatch	·	2.6 km	MPC · JPL
617088	2003 BD_{97}	—	January 9, 2014	Haleakala	Pan-STARRS 1	·	2.4 km	MPC · JPL
617089	2003 BK_{98}	—	September 15, 2006	Kitt Peak	Spacewatch	·	2.1 km	MPC · JPL
617090	2003 BB_{100}	—	July 25, 2015	Haleakala	Pan-STARRS 1	·	960 m	MPC · JPL
617091	2003 BG_{100}	—	March 20, 2007	Mount Lemmon	Mount Lemmon Survey	·	850 m	MPC · JPL
617092	2003 BJ_{100}	—	January 26, 2012	Mount Lemmon	Mount Lemmon Survey	MRX	770 m	MPC · JPL
617093	2003 BX_{100}	—	December 4, 2015	Mount Lemmon	Mount Lemmon Survey	·	1.2 km	MPC · JPL
617094	2003 BO_{101}	—	November 10, 2016	Mount Lemmon	Mount Lemmon Survey	V	500 m	MPC · JPL
617095	2003 BF_{102}	—	November 13, 2010	Mount Lemmon	Mount Lemmon Survey	·	1.3 km	MPC · JPL
617096	2003 EN_{38}	—	February 7, 2003	Palomar	NEAT	·	2.9 km	MPC · JPL
617097	2003 EV_{42}	—	March 10, 2003	Kitt Peak	Spacewatch	·	400 m	MPC · JPL
617098	2003 EH_{62}	—	March 7, 2003	Anderson Mesa	LONEOS	EUN	1.3 km	MPC · JPL
617099	2003 EN_{64}	—	March 12, 2003	Kitt Peak	Spacewatch	·	980 m	MPC · JPL
617100	2003 FV_{15}	—	March 23, 2003	Palomar	NEAT	H	570 m	MPC · JPL

== 617101–617200 ==
back to top

Designation			Discovery			Properties		Ref
Permanent	Provisional	Named after	Date	Site	Discoverer(s)	Category	Diam.	Ref
617101	2003 FY_{17}	—	March 24, 2003	Kitt Peak	Spacewatch	·	1.6 km	MPC · JPL
617102	2003 FJ_{53}	—	March 25, 2003	Palomar	NEAT	·	2.6 km	MPC · JPL
617103	2003 FM_{129}	—	March 31, 2003	Cerro Tololo	Deep Lens Survey	SDO	198 km	MPC · JPL
617104	2003 FY_{134}	—	March 26, 2003	Kitt Peak	Spacewatch	NYS	1.0 km	MPC · JPL
617105	2003 GY_{6}	—	April 3, 2003	Anderson Mesa	LONEOS	NYS	1.1 km	MPC · JPL
617106	2003 GC_{26}	—	April 4, 2003	Kitt Peak	Spacewatch	MAS	660 m	MPC · JPL
617107	2003 GG_{58}	—	April 5, 2003	Kitt Peak	Spacewatch	·	1.1 km	MPC · JPL
617108	2003 GK_{59}	—	April 5, 2003	Kitt Peak	Spacewatch	MAS	620 m	MPC · JPL
617109	2003 GY_{59}	—	February 26, 2014	Haleakala	Pan-STARRS 1	·	980 m	MPC · JPL
617110	2003 GH_{60}	—	January 18, 2008	Kitt Peak	Spacewatch	·	2.7 km	MPC · JPL
617111	2003 GT_{62}	—	February 16, 2012	Haleakala	Pan-STARRS 1	·	1.8 km	MPC · JPL
617112	2003 GS_{64}	—	January 6, 2010	Kitt Peak	Spacewatch	V	510 m	MPC · JPL
617113	2003 GO_{65}	—	April 1, 2003	Apache Point	SDSS Collaboration	·	2.1 km	MPC · JPL
617114	2003 HC_{7}	—	April 24, 2003	Kitt Peak	Spacewatch	NYS	1.0 km	MPC · JPL
617115	2003 HH_{23}	—	March 27, 2003	Palomar	NEAT	·	910 m	MPC · JPL
617116	2003 HS_{44}	—	April 28, 2003	Kitt Peak	Spacewatch	·	1 km	MPC · JPL
617117	2003 HZ_{52}	—	April 4, 2003	Kitt Peak	Spacewatch	·	1.0 km	MPC · JPL
617118	2003 HB_{62}	—	February 25, 2012	Mayhill-ISON	L. Elenin	·	1.7 km	MPC · JPL
617119	2003 HY_{62}	—	September 5, 2010	Mount Lemmon	Mount Lemmon Survey	·	1.7 km	MPC · JPL
617120	2003 HB_{63}	—	June 2, 2003	Kitt Peak	Spacewatch	PHO	970 m	MPC · JPL
617121	2003 HG_{65}	—	December 3, 2010	Mount Lemmon	Mount Lemmon Survey	·	1.5 km	MPC · JPL
617122	2003 JA_{19}	—	December 28, 2005	Kitt Peak	Spacewatch	·	1.3 km	MPC · JPL
617123	2003 JY_{19}	—	May 1, 2003	Kitt Peak	Spacewatch	·	1.0 km	MPC · JPL
617124	2003 JE_{20}	—	February 28, 2014	Haleakala	Pan-STARRS 1	MAS	530 m	MPC · JPL
617125	2003 JR_{20}	—	May 11, 2003	Kitt Peak	Spacewatch	NYS	1 km	MPC · JPL
617126	2003 KB_{1}	—	May 22, 2003	Kitt Peak	Spacewatch	·	1.3 km	MPC · JPL
617127	2003 KB_{7}	—	May 23, 2003	Kitt Peak	Spacewatch	·	1.7 km	MPC · JPL
617128	2003 KK_{30}	—	March 31, 2003	Kitt Peak	Spacewatch	·	1.2 km	MPC · JPL
617129	2003 KV_{31}	—	May 26, 2003	Kitt Peak	Spacewatch	·	1.7 km	MPC · JPL
617130	2003 KE_{39}	—	September 25, 2011	Haleakala	Pan-STARRS 1	·	930 m	MPC · JPL
617131	2003 LK_{10}	—	September 12, 2015	Haleakala	Pan-STARRS 1	·	1.0 km	MPC · JPL
617132	2003 ND_{14}	—	April 15, 2012	Haleakala	Pan-STARRS 1	·	640 m	MPC · JPL
617133	2003 PL_{4}	—	July 8, 2003	Palomar	NEAT	·	610 m	MPC · JPL
617134	2003 PG_{13}	—	September 14, 2013	Haleakala	Pan-STARRS 1	·	2.0 km	MPC · JPL
617135	2003 QK_{120}	—	August 22, 2003	Palomar	NEAT	·	380 m	MPC · JPL
617136	2003 QO_{122}	—	December 22, 2008	Mount Lemmon	Mount Lemmon Survey	·	820 m	MPC · JPL
617137	2003 SN_{78}	—	September 19, 2003	Kitt Peak	Spacewatch	·	720 m	MPC · JPL
617138	2003 SC_{239}	—	September 27, 2003	Kitt Peak	Spacewatch	NYS	800 m	MPC · JPL
617139	2003 SY_{241}	—	September 18, 2003	Kitt Peak	Spacewatch	·	510 m	MPC · JPL
617140	2003 SG_{269}	—	September 17, 2003	Palomar	NEAT	·	570 m	MPC · JPL
617141	2003 SZ_{302}	—	September 19, 2003	Anderson Mesa	LONEOS	·	700 m	MPC · JPL
617142	2003 SJ_{340}	—	October 2, 2003	Kitt Peak	Spacewatch	·	670 m	MPC · JPL
617143	2003 SY_{352}	—	September 20, 2003	Kitt Peak	Spacewatch	·	1.3 km	MPC · JPL
617144	2003 SF_{371}	—	September 29, 2003	Kitt Peak	Spacewatch	KOR	1.1 km	MPC · JPL
617145	2003 SF_{392}	—	September 26, 2003	Apache Point	SDSS Collaboration	EOS	1.3 km	MPC · JPL
617146	2003 SX_{392}	—	October 16, 2003	Palomar	NEAT	·	440 m	MPC · JPL
617147	2003 SY_{392}	—	September 26, 2003	Apache Point	SDSS Collaboration	EOS	1.4 km	MPC · JPL
617148	2003 SX_{394}	—	September 26, 2003	Apache Point	SDSS Collaboration	·	1.6 km	MPC · JPL
617149	2003 SS_{406}	—	September 27, 2003	Apache Point	SDSS Collaboration	·	1.7 km	MPC · JPL
617150	2003 SU_{435}	—	September 25, 2003	Palomar	NEAT	·	570 m	MPC · JPL
617151	2003 SV_{435}	—	September 27, 2003	Anderson Mesa	LONEOS	·	1.2 km	MPC · JPL
617152	2003 SF_{439}	—	September 30, 2003	Kitt Peak	Spacewatch	·	720 m	MPC · JPL
617153	2003 SG_{439}	—	September 18, 2003	Kitt Peak	Spacewatch	·	830 m	MPC · JPL
617154	2003 SH_{439}	—	September 18, 2003	Kitt Peak	Spacewatch	·	580 m	MPC · JPL
617155	2003 SK_{441}	—	September 18, 2003	Kitt Peak	Spacewatch	TEL	1.2 km	MPC · JPL
617156	2003 SL_{442}	—	October 5, 2013	Haleakala	Pan-STARRS 1	·	560 m	MPC · JPL
617157	2003 SJ_{445}	—	October 30, 2013	Haleakala	Pan-STARRS 1	·	530 m	MPC · JPL
617158	2003 SG_{450}	—	November 23, 2016	Mount Lemmon	Mount Lemmon Survey	·	650 m	MPC · JPL
617159	2003 SC_{453}	—	October 1, 2015	Mount Lemmon	Mount Lemmon Survey	·	690 m	MPC · JPL
617160	2003 SN_{453}	—	September 16, 2003	Kitt Peak	Spacewatch	·	430 m	MPC · JPL
617161	2003 SS_{457}	—	September 27, 2003	Kitt Peak	Spacewatch	EOS	1.3 km	MPC · JPL
617162	2003 SX_{460}	—	September 4, 2008	Kitt Peak	Spacewatch	·	1.7 km	MPC · JPL
617163	2003 SL_{461}	—	September 26, 2003	Apache Point	SDSS Collaboration	EOS	1.2 km	MPC · JPL
617164	2003 SS_{463}	—	September 25, 1998	Kitt Peak	Spacewatch	·	1.2 km	MPC · JPL
617165	2003 SN_{471}	—	September 16, 2003	Kitt Peak	Spacewatch	BRA	1.1 km	MPC · JPL
617166	2003 SQ_{475}	—	September 21, 2003	Kitt Peak	Spacewatch	·	1.5 km	MPC · JPL
617167	2003 TO_{60}	—	January 17, 2005	Kitt Peak	Spacewatch	·	670 m	MPC · JPL
617168	2003 TS_{61}	—	October 14, 2010	Mount Lemmon	Mount Lemmon Survey	·	570 m	MPC · JPL
617169	2003 TN_{64}	—	January 31, 2017	Haleakala	Pan-STARRS 1	·	850 m	MPC · JPL
617170	2003 TR_{64}	—	September 3, 2013	Haleakala	Pan-STARRS 1	EOS	1.5 km	MPC · JPL
617171	2003 UN_{224}	—	October 3, 2003	Kitt Peak	Spacewatch	·	1.3 km	MPC · JPL
617172	2003 UR_{240}	—	October 24, 2003	Kitt Peak	Spacewatch	·	650 m	MPC · JPL
617173	2003 UA_{316}	—	October 21, 2003	Palomar	NEAT	·	730 m	MPC · JPL
617174	2003 UV_{321}	—	October 16, 2003	Kitt Peak	Spacewatch	·	1.2 km	MPC · JPL
617175	2003 UJ_{364}	—	October 20, 2003	Kitt Peak	Spacewatch	·	1.3 km	MPC · JPL
617176	2003 UO_{367}	—	October 21, 2003	Kitt Peak	Spacewatch	MAR	820 m	MPC · JPL
617177	2003 UM_{386}	—	October 22, 2003	Apache Point	SDSS Collaboration	·	890 m	MPC · JPL
617178	2003 UQ_{395}	—	May 20, 2001	Cerro Tololo	Deep Ecliptic Survey	·	820 m	MPC · JPL
617179	2003 UW_{409}	—	October 23, 2003	Apache Point	SDSS Collaboration	·	1.9 km	MPC · JPL
617180	2003 UA_{416}	—	April 26, 2006	Kitt Peak	Spacewatch	·	1.8 km	MPC · JPL
617181	2003 UH_{419}	—	October 18, 2003	Palomar	NEAT	H	430 m	MPC · JPL
617182	2003 UD_{420}	—	September 26, 2008	Kitt Peak	Spacewatch	·	2.0 km	MPC · JPL
617183	2003 UL_{420}	—	October 26, 2008	Kitt Peak	Spacewatch	·	2.7 km	MPC · JPL
617184	2003 UW_{421}	—	January 9, 2013	Kitt Peak	Spacewatch	·	1.2 km	MPC · JPL
617185	2003 UL_{422}	—	September 10, 2013	Haleakala	Pan-STARRS 1	·	610 m	MPC · JPL
617186	2003 UE_{428}	—	January 22, 2015	Haleakala	Pan-STARRS 1	·	1.6 km	MPC · JPL
617187	2003 UH_{432}	—	October 29, 2003	Kitt Peak	Spacewatch	·	550 m	MPC · JPL
617188	2003 UE_{435}	—	August 20, 2006	Palomar	NEAT	·	500 m	MPC · JPL
617189	2003 UH_{441}	—	May 20, 2012	Mount Lemmon	Mount Lemmon Survey	·	460 m	MPC · JPL
617190	2003 VH_{7}	—	November 15, 2003	Kitt Peak	Spacewatch	·	880 m	MPC · JPL
617191	2003 VG_{13}	—	November 4, 2003	Ondřejov	Ondřejov, Observatoř	BAR	1.0 km	MPC · JPL
617192	2003 WV_{4}	—	October 27, 2003	Kitt Peak	Spacewatch	·	770 m	MPC · JPL
617193	2003 WB_{46}	—	October 16, 2003	Kitt Peak	Spacewatch	·	520 m	MPC · JPL
617194	2003 WE_{50}	—	November 14, 2003	Palomar	NEAT	·	720 m	MPC · JPL
617195	2003 WU_{60}	—	November 19, 2003	Kitt Peak	Spacewatch	·	2.4 km	MPC · JPL
617196	2003 WB_{88}	—	November 24, 2003	Nogales	P. R. Holvorcem, M. Schwartz	H	580 m	MPC · JPL
617197	2003 WU_{144}	—	November 20, 2003	Socorro	LINEAR	·	1.1 km	MPC · JPL
617198	2003 WO_{154}	—	November 26, 2003	Kitt Peak	Spacewatch	·	1.2 km	MPC · JPL
617199	2003 WD_{160}	—	November 19, 2003	Kitt Peak	Spacewatch	·	2.2 km	MPC · JPL
617200	2003 WP_{168}	—	November 19, 2003	Catalina	CSS	·	1.5 km	MPC · JPL

== 617201–617300 ==
back to top

Designation			Discovery			Properties		Ref
Permanent	Provisional	Named after	Date	Site	Discoverer(s)	Category	Diam.	Ref
617201	2003 WN_{196}	—	April 24, 2009	Mount Lemmon	Mount Lemmon Survey	L5	10 km	MPC · JPL
617202	2003 WN_{197}	—	October 20, 2017	Mount Lemmon	Mount Lemmon Survey	H	380 m	MPC · JPL
617203	2003 WP_{200}	—	December 13, 2010	Mauna Kea	M. Micheli, L. Wells	·	570 m	MPC · JPL
617204	2003 WS_{201}	—	August 26, 2011	Kitt Peak	Spacewatch	BRG	1.2 km	MPC · JPL
617205	2003 WB_{203}	—	March 21, 2015	Haleakala	Pan-STARRS 1	·	480 m	MPC · JPL
617206	2003 WG_{203}	—	March 2, 2009	Kitt Peak	Spacewatch	·	980 m	MPC · JPL
617207	2003 WN_{203}	—	October 5, 2015	Haleakala	Pan-STARRS 1	ADE	1.4 km	MPC · JPL
617208	2003 WX_{204}	—	November 3, 2011	Mount Lemmon	Mount Lemmon Survey	MAR	820 m	MPC · JPL
617209	2003 WB_{205}	—	July 2, 2014	Haleakala	Pan-STARRS 1	·	1.4 km	MPC · JPL
617210	2003 WZ_{205}	—	December 11, 2014	Mount Lemmon	Mount Lemmon Survey	EOS	1.6 km	MPC · JPL
617211	2003 WE_{206}	—	September 2, 2008	Kitt Peak	Spacewatch	·	1.7 km	MPC · JPL
617212	2003 WM_{206}	—	November 17, 2011	Kitt Peak	Spacewatch	·	900 m	MPC · JPL
617213	2003 WY_{206}	—	November 24, 2011	Mount Lemmon	Mount Lemmon Survey	·	910 m	MPC · JPL
617214	2003 WK_{208}	—	October 9, 2008	Mount Lemmon	Mount Lemmon Survey	EOS	1.4 km	MPC · JPL
617215	2003 WD_{213}	—	September 14, 2013	Haleakala	Pan-STARRS 1	·	1.7 km	MPC · JPL
617216	2003 XP_{45}	—	October 16, 2006	Catalina	CSS	·	520 m	MPC · JPL
617217	2003 YS_{42}	—	December 19, 2003	Kitt Peak	Spacewatch	·	660 m	MPC · JPL
617218	2003 YX_{92}	—	November 20, 2003	Kitt Peak	Deep Ecliptic Survey	JUN	1.1 km	MPC · JPL
617219	2003 YC_{108}	—	December 26, 2003	Piszkéstető	K. Sárneczky	·	1.7 km	MPC · JPL
617220	2003 YV_{110}	—	December 26, 2003	Piszkéstető	K. Sárneczky	KON	2.0 km	MPC · JPL
617221	2003 YP_{185}	—	December 9, 2015	Haleakala	Pan-STARRS 1	·	1.4 km	MPC · JPL
617222	2003 YZ_{186}	—	February 29, 2016	Haleakala	Pan-STARRS 1	·	2.4 km	MPC · JPL
617223	2003 YD_{187}	—	August 16, 2017	Haleakala	Pan-STARRS 1	·	1.7 km	MPC · JPL
617224	2003 YQ_{187}	—	November 19, 2008	Mount Lemmon	Mount Lemmon Survey	·	1.8 km	MPC · JPL
617225	2003 YJ_{188}	—	January 25, 2015	Haleakala	Pan-STARRS 1	·	2.3 km	MPC · JPL
617226	2003 YQ_{188}	—	February 8, 2011	Mount Lemmon	Mount Lemmon Survey	·	650 m	MPC · JPL
617227	2003 YT_{189}	—	September 24, 2011	Haleakala	Pan-STARRS 1	·	1.2 km	MPC · JPL
617228	2003 YV_{189}	—	October 8, 2008	Mount Lemmon	Mount Lemmon Survey	·	1.7 km	MPC · JPL
617229	2004 AV_{18}	—	January 15, 2004	Kitt Peak	Spacewatch	·	490 m	MPC · JPL
617230	2004 AG_{20}	—	January 15, 2004	Kitt Peak	Spacewatch	·	990 m	MPC · JPL
617231	2004 AR_{21}	—	January 15, 2004	Kitt Peak	Spacewatch	·	1.2 km	MPC · JPL
617232	2004 AC_{22}	—	January 15, 2004	Kitt Peak	Spacewatch	·	590 m	MPC · JPL
617233	2004 AQ_{22}	—	January 15, 2004	Kitt Peak	Spacewatch	·	1.8 km	MPC · JPL
617234	2004 BC	—	December 29, 2003	Kitt Peak	Spacewatch	PHO	900 m	MPC · JPL
617235	2004 BL_{124}	—	December 22, 2003	Kitt Peak	Spacewatch	·	630 m	MPC · JPL
617236	2004 BV_{124}	—	January 16, 2004	Kitt Peak	Spacewatch	·	2.6 km	MPC · JPL
617237	2004 BB_{133}	—	January 17, 2004	Kitt Peak	Spacewatch	·	660 m	MPC · JPL
617238	2004 BT_{138}	—	January 19, 2004	Kitt Peak	Spacewatch	·	580 m	MPC · JPL
617239	2004 BR_{163}	—	November 8, 2007	Kitt Peak	Spacewatch	·	910 m	MPC · JPL
617240	2004 BC_{164}	—	January 17, 2004	Palomar	NEAT	PHO	780 m	MPC · JPL
617241	2004 BE_{166}	—	December 14, 2015	Haleakala	Pan-STARRS 1	EUN	890 m	MPC · JPL
617242	2004 BM_{167}	—	January 30, 2004	Kitt Peak	Spacewatch	·	1.1 km	MPC · JPL
617243	2004 BZ_{169}	—	February 22, 2017	Haleakala	Pan-STARRS 1	·	970 m	MPC · JPL
617244	2004 BC_{170}	—	December 3, 2008	Mount Lemmon	Mount Lemmon Survey	EOS	1.6 km	MPC · JPL
617245	2004 BO_{172}	—	January 17, 2015	Haleakala	Pan-STARRS 1	·	2.2 km	MPC · JPL
617246	2004 CJ_{5}	—	February 11, 2004	Palomar	NEAT	·	1.7 km	MPC · JPL
617247	2004 CD_{19}	—	January 28, 2004	Kitt Peak	Spacewatch	·	1.4 km	MPC · JPL
617248	2004 CS_{86}	—	February 15, 2004	Socorro	LINEAR	·	1.4 km	MPC · JPL
617249	2004 CH_{90}	—	February 12, 2004	Kitt Peak	Spacewatch	·	600 m	MPC · JPL
617250	2004 CO_{111}	—	February 14, 2004	Kitt Peak	Spacewatch	·	700 m	MPC · JPL
617251	2004 CU_{132}	—	February 22, 2011	Kitt Peak	Spacewatch	·	630 m	MPC · JPL
617252	2004 CA_{134}	—	January 2, 2017	Haleakala	Pan-STARRS 1	·	1.2 km	MPC · JPL
617253	2004 CW_{134}	—	July 4, 2017	Haleakala	Pan-STARRS 1	·	2.2 km	MPC · JPL
617254	2004 DT_{64}	—	February 17, 2004	Kitt Peak	Spacewatch	·	2.2 km	MPC · JPL
617255	2004 DT_{74}	—	February 17, 2004	Kitt Peak	Spacewatch	·	1.3 km	MPC · JPL
617256	2004 DT_{80}	—	October 19, 2006	Kitt Peak	Spacewatch	·	780 m	MPC · JPL
617257	2004 DD_{81}	—	March 30, 2008	Kitt Peak	Spacewatch	·	770 m	MPC · JPL
617258	2004 DN_{81}	—	July 30, 2014	Kitt Peak	Spacewatch	·	910 m	MPC · JPL
617259	2004 DY_{81}	—	December 6, 2013	Haleakala	Pan-STARRS 1	·	700 m	MPC · JPL
617260	2004 DJ_{82}	—	December 31, 2008	Kitt Peak	Spacewatch	·	2.0 km	MPC · JPL
617261	2004 DM_{82}	—	August 21, 2006	Kitt Peak	Spacewatch	EOS	2.0 km	MPC · JPL
617262	2004 DV_{82}	—	February 26, 2004	Kitt Peak	Deep Ecliptic Survey	·	2.5 km	MPC · JPL
617263	2004 DW_{82}	—	February 26, 2011	Mount Lemmon	Mount Lemmon Survey	·	670 m	MPC · JPL
617264	2004 DA_{83}	—	December 22, 2008	Mount Lemmon	Mount Lemmon Survey	·	2.5 km	MPC · JPL
617265	2004 DU_{84}	—	January 14, 2018	Haleakala	Pan-STARRS 1	·	630 m	MPC · JPL
617266	2004 DA_{87}	—	January 31, 2017	Mount Lemmon	Mount Lemmon Survey	EUN	880 m	MPC · JPL
617267	2004 EG_{51}	—	September 14, 1998	Kitt Peak	Spacewatch	·	690 m	MPC · JPL
617268	2004 ES_{89}	—	March 14, 2004	Kitt Peak	Spacewatch	·	720 m	MPC · JPL
617269	2004 EK_{104}	—	March 15, 2004	Kitt Peak	Spacewatch	V	560 m	MPC · JPL
617270	2004 EH_{111}	—	March 15, 2004	Kitt Peak	Spacewatch	·	580 m	MPC · JPL
617271	2004 ED_{114}	—	March 15, 2004	Kitt Peak	Spacewatch	MIS	2.1 km	MPC · JPL
617272	2004 FJ_{6}	—	March 23, 2004	Socorro	LINEAR	PHO	820 m	MPC · JPL
617273	2004 FB_{48}	—	March 18, 2004	Socorro	LINEAR	·	650 m	MPC · JPL
617274	2004 FQ_{58}	—	March 17, 2004	Kitt Peak	Spacewatch	·	590 m	MPC · JPL
617275	2004 FX_{70}	—	February 26, 2004	Kitt Peak	Deep Ecliptic Survey	·	600 m	MPC · JPL
617276	2004 FC_{125}	—	March 27, 2004	Socorro	LINEAR	·	1.7 km	MPC · JPL
617277	2004 FT_{150}	—	March 16, 2004	Kitt Peak	Spacewatch	·	2.3 km	MPC · JPL
617278	2004 FK_{156}	—	March 17, 2004	Kitt Peak	Spacewatch	·	610 m	MPC · JPL
617279	2004 FV_{167}	—	March 17, 2004	Kitt Peak	Spacewatch	NYS	850 m	MPC · JPL
617280	2004 FC_{168}	—	January 30, 2011	Kitt Peak	Spacewatch	·	720 m	MPC · JPL
617281	2004 FK_{168}	—	December 18, 2007	Mount Lemmon	Mount Lemmon Survey	·	1.2 km	MPC · JPL
617282	2004 FS_{169}	—	March 6, 2011	Mount Lemmon	Mount Lemmon Survey	·	580 m	MPC · JPL
617283	2004 FD_{170}	—	March 30, 2011	Haleakala	Pan-STARRS 1	V	560 m	MPC · JPL
617284	2004 FR_{171}	—	April 9, 2015	Mount Lemmon	Mount Lemmon Survey	EOS	1.4 km	MPC · JPL
617285	2004 FF_{173}	—	June 11, 2015	Haleakala	Pan-STARRS 1	·	760 m	MPC · JPL
617286	2004 GW_{18}	—	April 12, 2004	Kitt Peak	Spacewatch	H	390 m	MPC · JPL
617287	2004 GD_{30}	—	April 12, 2004	Kitt Peak	Spacewatch	·	670 m	MPC · JPL
617288	2004 GR_{55}	—	April 13, 2004	Kitt Peak	Spacewatch	·	1.4 km	MPC · JPL
617289	2004 GH_{61}	—	April 13, 2004	Kitt Peak	Spacewatch	·	1.3 km	MPC · JPL
617290	2004 GO_{67}	—	April 13, 2004	Kitt Peak	Spacewatch	·	3.2 km	MPC · JPL
617291	2004 GR_{72}	—	April 14, 2004	Kitt Peak	Spacewatch	·	750 m	MPC · JPL
617292	2004 GG_{76}	—	March 20, 2004	Socorro	LINEAR	·	650 m	MPC · JPL
617293	2004 GD_{90}	—	October 29, 2006	Kitt Peak	Spacewatch	·	2.7 km	MPC · JPL
617294	2004 HB_{30}	—	April 21, 2004	Socorro	LINEAR	·	1.2 km	MPC · JPL
617295	2004 HS_{30}	—	April 13, 2004	Palomar	NEAT	·	740 m	MPC · JPL
617296	2004 HN_{42}	—	April 20, 2004	Socorro	LINEAR	·	920 m	MPC · JPL
617297	2004 HT_{58}	—	April 24, 2004	Kitt Peak	Spacewatch	·	610 m	MPC · JPL
617298	2004 HL_{69}	—	April 22, 2004	Kitt Peak	Spacewatch	·	660 m	MPC · JPL
617299	2004 HF_{83}	—	November 2, 2007	Mount Lemmon	Mount Lemmon Survey	·	3.2 km	MPC · JPL
617300	2004 HP_{83}	—	April 30, 2004	Kitt Peak	Spacewatch	·	980 m	MPC · JPL

== 617301–617400 ==
back to top

Designation			Discovery			Properties		Ref
Permanent	Provisional	Named after	Date	Site	Discoverer(s)	Category	Diam.	Ref
617301	2004 JO_{37}	—	May 13, 2004	Kitt Peak	Spacewatch	MAR	840 m	MPC · JPL
617302	2004 JX_{40}	—	May 14, 2004	Kitt Peak	Spacewatch	H	430 m	MPC · JPL
617303	2004 JB_{54}	—	May 9, 2004	Kitt Peak	Spacewatch	·	3.6 km	MPC · JPL
617304	2004 JC_{57}	—	May 12, 2004	Apache Point	SDSS	·	1.7 km	MPC · JPL
617305	2004 KO_{6}	—	May 9, 2004	Kitt Peak	Spacewatch	·	730 m	MPC · JPL
617306	2004 KT_{17}	—	May 19, 2004	Kitt Peak	Spacewatch	·	1 km	MPC · JPL
617307	2004 KA_{20}	—	October 18, 2012	Haleakala	Pan-STARRS 1	·	3.7 km	MPC · JPL
617308	2004 KM_{20}	—	May 23, 2004	Kitt Peak	Spacewatch	·	740 m	MPC · JPL
617309	2004 KZ_{21}	—	August 21, 2008	Kitt Peak	Spacewatch	·	650 m	MPC · JPL
617310	2004 LY_{10}	—	June 9, 2004	Siding Spring	SSS	·	2.7 km	MPC · JPL
617311	2004 ML_{10}	—	June 25, 2004	Kitt Peak	Spacewatch	·	800 m	MPC · JPL
617312	2004 NW_{16}	—	July 11, 2004	Socorro	LINEAR	·	1.1 km	MPC · JPL
617313	2004 NW_{31}	—	July 15, 2004	Siding Spring	SSS	·	880 m	MPC · JPL
617314	2004 OA_{14}	—	July 22, 2004	Mauna Kea	Veillet, C.	V	410 m	MPC · JPL
617315	2004 PW	—	August 6, 2004	Palomar	NEAT	·	1.6 km	MPC · JPL
617316	2004 PS_{9}	—	August 6, 2004	Campo Imperatore	CINEOS	·	2.3 km	MPC · JPL
617317	2004 PO_{66}	—	August 10, 2004	Campo Imperatore	CINEOS	·	2.6 km	MPC · JPL
617318	2004 QC_{10}	—	August 8, 2004	Anderson Mesa	LONEOS	·	2.3 km	MPC · JPL
617319	2004 QB_{14}	—	August 24, 2004	Socorro	LINEAR	·	1.6 km	MPC · JPL
617320	2004 QN_{29}	—	August 22, 2004	Kitt Peak	Spacewatch	·	890 m	MPC · JPL
617321	2004 QK_{33}	—	September 9, 2008	Mount Lemmon	Mount Lemmon Survey	NYS	1.0 km	MPC · JPL
617322	2004 QQ_{33}	—	May 3, 2008	Mount Lemmon	Mount Lemmon Survey	(13314)	1.4 km	MPC · JPL
617323	2004 QO_{36}	—	September 23, 2011	Haleakala	Pan-STARRS 1	·	2.8 km	MPC · JPL
617324	2004 QP_{36}	—	April 22, 2007	Mount Lemmon	Mount Lemmon Survey	MAS	570 m	MPC · JPL
617325	2004 RW_{8}	—	September 6, 2004	Goodricke-Pigott	R. A. Tucker	·	2.1 km	MPC · JPL
617326	2004 RN_{33}	—	August 8, 2004	Anderson Mesa	LONEOS	NYS	1.2 km	MPC · JPL
617327	2004 RF_{81}	—	September 7, 2004	Goodricke-Pigott	R. A. Tucker	·	880 m	MPC · JPL
617328	2004 RJ_{85}	—	September 8, 2004	Bergisch Gladbach	W. Bickel	NYS	970 m	MPC · JPL
617329	2004 RQ_{130}	—	September 7, 2004	Kitt Peak	Spacewatch	·	920 m	MPC · JPL
617330	2004 RU_{131}	—	September 7, 2004	Kitt Peak	Spacewatch	·	1.2 km	MPC · JPL
617331	2004 RW_{132}	—	September 7, 2004	Kitt Peak	Spacewatch	·	1.8 km	MPC · JPL
617332	2004 RD_{170}	—	September 8, 2004	Socorro	LINEAR	·	920 m	MPC · JPL
617333	2004 RU_{238}	—	September 10, 2004	Kitt Peak	Spacewatch	AGN	890 m	MPC · JPL
617334	2004 RA_{263}	—	September 10, 2004	Kitt Peak	Spacewatch	KOR	1.4 km	MPC · JPL
617335	2004 RT_{265}	—	September 10, 2004	Kitt Peak	Spacewatch	·	880 m	MPC · JPL
617336	2004 RO_{267}	—	September 11, 2004	Kitt Peak	Spacewatch	NYS	870 m	MPC · JPL
617337	2004 RW_{267}	—	September 11, 2004	Kitt Peak	Spacewatch	·	1.6 km	MPC · JPL
617338	2004 RB_{269}	—	September 11, 2004	Kitt Peak	Spacewatch	V	490 m	MPC · JPL
617339	2004 RD_{270}	—	September 11, 2004	Kitt Peak	Spacewatch	GEF	960 m	MPC · JPL
617340	2004 RG_{281}	—	September 15, 2004	Kitt Peak	Spacewatch	·	1.7 km	MPC · JPL
617341	2004 RC_{284}	—	September 15, 2004	Kitt Peak	Spacewatch	·	1.2 km	MPC · JPL
617342	2004 RS_{295}	—	September 11, 2004	Kitt Peak	Spacewatch	MAS	550 m	MPC · JPL
617343	2004 RT_{305}	—	September 12, 2004	Socorro	LINEAR	·	1.1 km	MPC · JPL
617344	2004 RK_{313}	—	September 15, 2004	Kitt Peak	Spacewatch	·	830 m	MPC · JPL
617345	2004 RB_{331}	—	September 15, 2004	Kitt Peak	Spacewatch	·	1.4 km	MPC · JPL
617346	2004 RC_{332}	—	September 14, 2004	Palomar	NEAT	·	1.7 km	MPC · JPL
617347	2004 RA_{359}	—	April 27, 2008	Mount Lemmon	Mount Lemmon Survey	·	2.8 km	MPC · JPL
617348	2004 RK_{360}	—	April 20, 2007	Kitt Peak	Spacewatch	·	940 m	MPC · JPL
617349	2004 RL_{360}	—	September 23, 2008	Kitt Peak	Spacewatch	MAS	660 m	MPC · JPL
617350	2004 RH_{361}	—	September 11, 2004	Kitt Peak	Spacewatch	·	940 m	MPC · JPL
617351	2004 RD_{363}	—	February 5, 2016	Mount Lemmon	Mount Lemmon Survey	H	340 m	MPC · JPL
617352	2004 RE_{364}	—	March 29, 2012	Kitt Peak	Spacewatch	·	1.5 km	MPC · JPL
617353	2004 RP_{364}	—	December 10, 2010	Mount Lemmon	Mount Lemmon Survey	HOF	2.1 km	MPC · JPL
617354	2004 RW_{364}	—	September 28, 2009	Kitt Peak	Spacewatch	·	1.2 km	MPC · JPL
617355	2004 SH_{23}	—	September 17, 2004	Kitt Peak	Spacewatch	·	810 m	MPC · JPL
617356	2004 SM_{35}	—	August 22, 2004	Kitt Peak	Spacewatch	·	590 m	MPC · JPL
617357	2004 SK_{62}	—	November 17, 2014	Haleakala	Pan-STARRS 1	·	1.5 km	MPC · JPL
617358	2004 SR_{62}	—	March 11, 2007	Kitt Peak	Spacewatch	NYS	920 m	MPC · JPL
617359	2004 SL_{63}	—	August 17, 2013	Haleakala	Pan-STARRS 1	·	1.4 km	MPC · JPL
617360	2004 ST_{63}	—	September 17, 2004	Kitt Peak	Spacewatch	·	610 m	MPC · JPL
617361	2004 TN_{22}	—	October 4, 2004	Kitt Peak	Spacewatch	ERI	1.2 km	MPC · JPL
617362	2004 TH_{37}	—	September 22, 2004	Kitt Peak	Spacewatch	·	770 m	MPC · JPL
617363	2004 TJ_{39}	—	October 4, 2004	Kitt Peak	Spacewatch	·	1.2 km	MPC · JPL
617364	2004 TV_{39}	—	October 4, 2004	Kitt Peak	Spacewatch	AGN	950 m	MPC · JPL
617365	2004 TP_{58}	—	October 5, 2004	Kitt Peak	Spacewatch	·	740 m	MPC · JPL
617366	2004 TS_{78}	—	October 4, 2004	Kitt Peak	Spacewatch	KOR	970 m	MPC · JPL
617367	2004 TS_{81}	—	October 5, 2004	Kitt Peak	Spacewatch	·	940 m	MPC · JPL
617368	2004 TL_{96}	—	October 5, 2004	Kitt Peak	Spacewatch	MAS	660 m	MPC · JPL
617369	2004 TC_{156}	—	September 9, 2004	Kitt Peak	Spacewatch	·	940 m	MPC · JPL
617370	2004 TT_{256}	—	October 9, 2004	Kitt Peak	Spacewatch	NYS	920 m	MPC · JPL
617371	2004 TJ_{267}	—	October 9, 2004	Kitt Peak	Spacewatch	·	1.4 km	MPC · JPL
617372	2004 TK_{275}	—	October 9, 2004	Kitt Peak	Spacewatch	MAS	650 m	MPC · JPL
617373	2004 TH_{294}	—	October 10, 2004	Kitt Peak	Spacewatch	·	900 m	MPC · JPL
617374	2004 TJ_{339}	—	October 13, 2004	Kitt Peak	Spacewatch	KOR	1.1 km	MPC · JPL
617375	2004 TX_{340}	—	October 13, 2004	Kitt Peak	Spacewatch	·	1.3 km	MPC · JPL
617376	2004 TJ_{353}	—	September 11, 2004	Kitt Peak	Spacewatch	·	1.2 km	MPC · JPL
617377	2004 TN_{360}	—	October 10, 2004	Kitt Peak	Spacewatch	·	860 m	MPC · JPL
617378	2004 TV_{368}	—	October 11, 2004	Kitt Peak	Spacewatch	·	920 m	MPC · JPL
617379	2004 TM_{379}	—	August 29, 2013	Haleakala	Pan-STARRS 1	·	1.6 km	MPC · JPL
617380	2004 TR_{380}	—	August 15, 2013	Haleakala	Pan-STARRS 1	·	1.5 km	MPC · JPL
617381	2004 TW_{384}	—	October 15, 2004	Kitt Peak	Spacewatch	·	1.6 km	MPC · JPL
617382	2004 TS_{386}	—	October 15, 2004	Kitt Peak	Deep Ecliptic Survey	·	1.4 km	MPC · JPL
617383	2004 UX_{11}	—	October 23, 2004	Kitt Peak	Spacewatch	·	1.6 km	MPC · JPL
617384	2004 VS_{79}	—	October 8, 2004	Kitt Peak	Spacewatch	·	1.3 km	MPC · JPL
617385	2004 VV_{81}	—	November 4, 2004	Kitt Peak	Spacewatch	H	280 m	MPC · JPL
617386	2004 VU_{89}	—	November 11, 2004	Kitt Peak	Spacewatch	·	590 m	MPC · JPL
617387	2004 VE_{133}	—	January 25, 2006	Kitt Peak	Spacewatch	MAS	820 m	MPC · JPL
617388	2004 VY_{135}	—	February 27, 2012	Haleakala	Pan-STARRS 1	·	620 m	MPC · JPL
617389	2004 XP_{62}	—	December 14, 2004	Junk Bond	D. Healy	KOR	1.3 km	MPC · JPL
617390	2004 XL_{148}	—	December 13, 2004	Kitt Peak	Spacewatch	·	2.3 km	MPC · JPL
617391	2004 XU_{193}	—	February 3, 2009	Mount Lemmon	Mount Lemmon Survey	·	1.2 km	MPC · JPL
617392	2004 XD_{194}	—	August 28, 2011	Siding Spring	SSS	·	1.2 km	MPC · JPL
617393	2004 YE_{13}	—	December 19, 2004	Mount Lemmon	Mount Lemmon Survey	L5	9.4 km	MPC · JPL
617394	2004 YM_{40}	—	December 20, 2004	Mount Lemmon	Mount Lemmon Survey	·	1.3 km	MPC · JPL
617395	2004 YV_{41}	—	December 19, 2004	Mount Lemmon	Mount Lemmon Survey	·	1.4 km	MPC · JPL
617396	2004 YZ_{41}	—	December 19, 2004	Mount Lemmon	Mount Lemmon Survey	·	790 m	MPC · JPL
617397	2005 AW_{27}	—	December 13, 2004	Kitt Peak	Spacewatch	L5	10 km	MPC · JPL
617398	2005 AG_{53}	—	January 13, 2005	Kitt Peak	Spacewatch	·	1.6 km	MPC · JPL
617399	2005 AP_{65}	—	January 13, 2005	Kitt Peak	Spacewatch	·	1.9 km	MPC · JPL
617400	2005 AQ_{71}	—	January 15, 2005	Kitt Peak	Spacewatch	·	2.3 km	MPC · JPL

== 617401–617500 ==
back to top

Designation			Discovery			Properties		Ref
Permanent	Provisional	Named after	Date	Site	Discoverer(s)	Category	Diam.	Ref
617401	2005 BG_{32}	—	January 17, 2005	Kleť	M. Tichý	·	1.8 km	MPC · JPL
617402	2005 BC_{34}	—	January 16, 2005	Mauna Kea	Veillet, C.	L5	7.1 km	MPC · JPL
617403 Boley	2005 BT_{47}	Boley	January 16, 2005	Mauna Kea	P. A. Wiegert, D. D. Balam	·	2.4 km	MPC · JPL
617404	2005 BV_{54}	—	June 22, 2010	Mount Lemmon	Mount Lemmon Survey	L5	10 km	MPC · JPL
617405	2005 CF_{3}	—	December 20, 2004	Mount Lemmon	Mount Lemmon Survey	·	2.0 km	MPC · JPL
617406	2005 CU_{55}	—	February 4, 2005	Mount Lemmon	Mount Lemmon Survey	·	2.2 km	MPC · JPL
617407	2005 CC_{82}	—	February 9, 2005	Mount Lemmon	Mount Lemmon Survey	·	840 m	MPC · JPL
617408	2005 CX_{86}	—	February 4, 2005	Kitt Peak	Spacewatch	·	1.7 km	MPC · JPL
617409	2005 DE_{4}	—	May 28, 2014	Mount Lemmon	Mount Lemmon Survey	·	810 m	MPC · JPL
617410	2005 EP_{17}	—	March 3, 2005	Kitt Peak	Spacewatch	·	1.1 km	MPC · JPL
617411	2005 EQ_{127}	—	March 9, 2005	Kitt Peak	Spacewatch	·	1.8 km	MPC · JPL
617412	2005 ED_{167}	—	March 11, 2005	Mount Lemmon	Mount Lemmon Survey	·	2.0 km	MPC · JPL
617413	2005 EA_{191}	—	March 11, 2005	Mount Lemmon	Mount Lemmon Survey	·	810 m	MPC · JPL
617414	2005 ED_{200}	—	October 18, 2003	Kitt Peak	Spacewatch	·	850 m	MPC · JPL
617415	2005 ED_{215}	—	March 8, 2005	Anderson Mesa	LONEOS	·	1.5 km	MPC · JPL
617416	2005 EK_{250}	—	March 15, 2005	Mount Lemmon	Mount Lemmon Survey	H	530 m	MPC · JPL
617417	2005 EO_{255}	—	September 17, 2012	Mount Lemmon	Mount Lemmon Survey	·	1.6 km	MPC · JPL
617418	2005 EG_{319}	—	January 16, 2005	Kitt Peak	Spacewatch	·	560 m	MPC · JPL
617419	2005 EJ_{334}	—	March 8, 2005	Mount Lemmon	Mount Lemmon Survey	·	600 m	MPC · JPL
617420	2005 EU_{341}	—	March 9, 2005	Mount Lemmon	Mount Lemmon Survey	·	520 m	MPC · JPL
617421	2005 EW_{341}	—	February 16, 2013	Mount Lemmon	Mount Lemmon Survey	·	990 m	MPC · JPL
617422	2005 EY_{341}	—	October 27, 2008	Mount Lemmon	Mount Lemmon Survey	·	1.4 km	MPC · JPL
617423	2005 EV_{345}	—	January 13, 2008	Kitt Peak	Spacewatch	·	520 m	MPC · JPL
617424	2005 FW_{16}	—	March 17, 2005	Catalina	CSS	·	720 m	MPC · JPL
617425	2005 FK_{18}	—	February 15, 2015	Haleakala	Pan-STARRS 1	EOS	1.3 km	MPC · JPL
617426	2005 FT_{18}	—	March 17, 2005	Mount Lemmon	Mount Lemmon Survey	TEL	1.0 km	MPC · JPL
617427	2005 GX_{34}	—	January 16, 2005	Kitt Peak	Spacewatch	·	440 m	MPC · JPL
617428	2005 GJ_{42}	—	April 5, 2005	Mount Lemmon	Mount Lemmon Survey	·	1.0 km	MPC · JPL
617429	2005 GL_{64}	—	April 2, 2005	Catalina	CSS	·	1.3 km	MPC · JPL
617430	2005 GB_{76}	—	April 2, 2005	Mount Lemmon	Mount Lemmon Survey	·	1.0 km	MPC · JPL
617431	2005 GC_{100}	—	March 3, 2005	Catalina	CSS	·	2.3 km	MPC · JPL
617432	2005 GX_{105}	—	April 10, 2005	Kitt Peak	Spacewatch	·	1.3 km	MPC · JPL
617433	2005 GA_{106}	—	April 10, 2005	Kitt Peak	Spacewatch	·	2.5 km	MPC · JPL
617434	2005 GG_{129}	—	April 7, 2005	Kitt Peak	Spacewatch	·	730 m	MPC · JPL
617435	2005 GD_{238}	—	April 2, 2009	Mount Lemmon	Mount Lemmon Survey	·	1.1 km	MPC · JPL
617436	2005 GW_{239}	—	April 11, 2005	Mount Lemmon	Mount Lemmon Survey	3:2	4.8 km	MPC · JPL
617437	2005 HD_{11}	—	February 13, 2008	Kitt Peak	Spacewatch	·	530 m	MPC · JPL
617438	2005 JD_{6}	—	April 2, 2005	Mount Lemmon	Mount Lemmon Survey	·	1.0 km	MPC · JPL
617439	2005 JP_{6}	—	April 7, 2005	Mount Lemmon	Mount Lemmon Survey	·	2.7 km	MPC · JPL
617440	2005 JM_{9}	—	May 4, 2005	Mauna Kea	Veillet, C.	·	1.1 km	MPC · JPL
617441	2005 JB_{28}	—	May 3, 2005	Catalina	CSS	·	1.4 km	MPC · JPL
617442	2005 JG_{52}	—	May 4, 2005	Kitt Peak	Spacewatch	·	770 m	MPC · JPL
617443	2005 JK_{54}	—	May 4, 2005	Kitt Peak	Spacewatch	·	2.6 km	MPC · JPL
617444	2005 JY_{85}	—	May 8, 2005	Mount Lemmon	Mount Lemmon Survey	·	520 m	MPC · JPL
617445	2005 JO_{94}	—	September 15, 2006	Kitt Peak	Spacewatch	(5)	1.2 km	MPC · JPL
617446	2005 JZ_{115}	—	April 4, 2005	Mount Lemmon	Mount Lemmon Survey	·	2.3 km	MPC · JPL
617447	2005 JN_{152}	—	May 4, 2005	Kitt Peak	Spacewatch	·	3.1 km	MPC · JPL
617448	2005 JW_{157}	—	May 4, 2005	Kitt Peak	Spacewatch	·	390 m	MPC · JPL
617449	2005 JD_{168}	—	August 28, 2006	Siding Spring	SSS	·	1.4 km	MPC · JPL
617450	2005 JT_{174}	—	May 14, 2005	Mount Lemmon	Mount Lemmon Survey	·	1.4 km	MPC · JPL
617451	2005 JM_{188}	—	May 14, 2009	Mount Lemmon	Mount Lemmon Survey	·	1.1 km	MPC · JPL
617452	2005 JT_{190}	—	May 15, 2005	Mount Lemmon	Mount Lemmon Survey	EOS	2.0 km	MPC · JPL
617453	2005 LF_{50}	—	June 3, 2005	Kitt Peak	Spacewatch	EUN	1.1 km	MPC · JPL
617454	2005 LK_{52}	—	June 13, 2005	Mount Lemmon	Mount Lemmon Survey	·	470 m	MPC · JPL
617455	2005 LH_{55}	—	June 10, 2005	Kitt Peak	Spacewatch	·	590 m	MPC · JPL
617456	2005 LM_{57}	—	March 12, 2008	Mount Lemmon	Mount Lemmon Survey	·	690 m	MPC · JPL
617457	2005 LN_{57}	—	June 15, 2005	Mount Lemmon	Mount Lemmon Survey	·	840 m	MPC · JPL
617458	2005 MS_{5}	—	June 29, 2005	Kitt Peak	Spacewatch	BAR	1.2 km	MPC · JPL
617459	2005 MQ_{22}	—	June 30, 2005	Kitt Peak	Spacewatch	·	610 m	MPC · JPL
617460	2005 MB_{24}	—	June 27, 2005	Kitt Peak	Spacewatch	·	1.6 km	MPC · JPL
617461	2005 MM_{33}	—	September 24, 1995	Kitt Peak	Spacewatch	·	510 m	MPC · JPL
617462	2005 MO_{47}	—	June 29, 2005	Palomar	NEAT	·	1.3 km	MPC · JPL
617463	2005 MX_{47}	—	June 29, 2005	Kitt Peak	Spacewatch	·	1.7 km	MPC · JPL
617464	2005 MS_{49}	—	June 30, 2005	Kitt Peak	Spacewatch	·	540 m	MPC · JPL
617465	2005 ML_{55}	—	June 30, 2014	Haleakala	Pan-STARRS 1	EUN	1.2 km	MPC · JPL
617466	2005 NT	—	July 2, 2005	Kitt Peak	Spacewatch	·	590 m	MPC · JPL
617467	2005 NS_{14}	—	July 2, 2005	Kitt Peak	Spacewatch	EUN	1.2 km	MPC · JPL
617468	2005 NR_{27}	—	June 18, 2005	Mount Lemmon	Mount Lemmon Survey	EUN	1.4 km	MPC · JPL
617469	2005 NZ_{31}	—	July 5, 2005	Kitt Peak	Spacewatch	·	1.1 km	MPC · JPL
617470	2005 NW_{35}	—	July 5, 2005	Palomar	NEAT	·	3.2 km	MPC · JPL
617471	2005 NJ_{59}	—	July 9, 2005	Kitt Peak	Spacewatch	·	1.5 km	MPC · JPL
617472	2005 NP_{61}	—	July 11, 2005	Kitt Peak	Spacewatch	·	820 m	MPC · JPL
617473	2005 NM_{62}	—	July 11, 2005	Kitt Peak	Spacewatch	·	1.2 km	MPC · JPL
617474	2005 NW_{66}	—	July 2, 2005	Kitt Peak	Spacewatch	·	530 m	MPC · JPL
617475	2005 NZ_{70}	—	July 5, 2005	Kitt Peak	Spacewatch	·	520 m	MPC · JPL
617476	2005 NW_{83}	—	July 1, 2005	Kitt Peak	Spacewatch	·	1.5 km	MPC · JPL
617477	2005 NH_{89}	—	July 4, 2005	Mount Lemmon	Mount Lemmon Survey	·	580 m	MPC · JPL
617478	2005 NF_{105}	—	July 15, 2005	Mount Lemmon	Mount Lemmon Survey	V	520 m	MPC · JPL
617479	2005 NT_{117}	—	July 7, 2005	Mauna Kea	Veillet, C.	·	1.2 km	MPC · JPL
617480	2005 NZ_{127}	—	July 5, 2005	Mount Lemmon	Mount Lemmon Survey	·	850 m	MPC · JPL
617481	2005 NG_{128}	—	April 30, 2008	Kitt Peak	Spacewatch	·	620 m	MPC · JPL
617482	2005 NO_{128}	—	November 13, 2006	Kitt Peak	Spacewatch	·	1.4 km	MPC · JPL
617483	2005 NQ_{129}	—	May 4, 2016	Kitt Peak	Spacewatch	H	480 m	MPC · JPL
617484	2005 NM_{130}	—	December 13, 2015	Haleakala	Pan-STARRS 1	HNS	1.1 km	MPC · JPL
617485	2005 NG_{132}	—	July 5, 2005	Mount Lemmon	Mount Lemmon Survey	EUP	3.3 km	MPC · JPL
617486	2005 OJ	—	July 4, 2005	Palomar	NEAT	·	1.2 km	MPC · JPL
617487	2005 OP_{32}	—	June 19, 2012	Mount Lemmon	Mount Lemmon Survey	·	880 m	MPC · JPL
617488	2005 OP_{33}	—	December 13, 2012	Kitt Peak	Spacewatch	·	3.6 km	MPC · JPL
617489	2005 OQ_{34}	—	April 7, 2008	Kitt Peak	Spacewatch	·	490 m	MPC · JPL
617490	2005 PQ_{29}	—	April 7, 2008	Kitt Peak	Spacewatch	·	660 m	MPC · JPL
617491	2005 PX_{29}	—	February 9, 2008	Mount Lemmon	Mount Lemmon Survey	EUN	1.1 km	MPC · JPL
617492	2005 PF_{31}	—	August 9, 2005	Cerro Tololo	Deep Ecliptic Survey	·	1.3 km	MPC · JPL
617493	2005 QX_{10}	—	July 29, 2005	Palomar	NEAT	·	530 m	MPC · JPL
617494	2005 QG_{17}	—	August 25, 2005	Palomar	NEAT	·	1.7 km	MPC · JPL
617495	2005 QD_{28}	—	August 28, 2005	Junk Bond	D. Healy	·	880 m	MPC · JPL
617496	2005 QB_{33}	—	August 6, 2005	Palomar	NEAT	·	830 m	MPC · JPL
617497	2005 QJ_{35}	—	August 25, 2005	Palomar	NEAT	·	680 m	MPC · JPL
617498	2005 QR_{43}	—	August 26, 2005	Palomar	NEAT	·	1.9 km	MPC · JPL
617499	2005 QF_{59}	—	August 25, 2005	Palomar	NEAT	·	1.4 km	MPC · JPL
617500	2005 QQ_{62}	—	August 26, 2005	Palomar	NEAT	·	480 m	MPC · JPL

== 617501–617600 ==
back to top

Designation			Discovery			Properties		Ref
Permanent	Provisional	Named after	Date	Site	Discoverer(s)	Category	Diam.	Ref
617501	2005 QP_{72}	—	August 29, 2005	Kitt Peak	Spacewatch	JUN	820 m	MPC · JPL
617502	2005 QV_{99}	—	August 30, 2005	Kitt Peak	Spacewatch	·	1.1 km	MPC · JPL
617503	2005 QH_{111}	—	August 30, 2005	Kitt Peak	Spacewatch	·	760 m	MPC · JPL
617504	2005 QJ_{113}	—	August 30, 2005	Kitt Peak	Spacewatch	·	1.8 km	MPC · JPL
617505	2005 QN_{114}	—	August 31, 2005	Kitt Peak	Spacewatch	·	1.6 km	MPC · JPL
617506	2005 QJ_{130}	—	August 28, 2005	Kitt Peak	Spacewatch	·	1.7 km	MPC · JPL
617507	2005 QY_{152}	—	August 26, 2005	Palomar	NEAT	·	660 m	MPC · JPL
617508	2005 QR_{159}	—	July 29, 2005	Palomar	NEAT	·	4.0 km	MPC · JPL
617509	2005 QR_{163}	—	August 30, 2005	Kitt Peak	Spacewatch	·	590 m	MPC · JPL
617510	2005 QP_{190}	—	August 30, 2005	Palomar	NEAT	·	2.7 km	MPC · JPL
617511	2005 QZ_{190}	—	August 31, 2005	Kitt Peak	Spacewatch	·	1.6 km	MPC · JPL
617512	2005 QV_{191}	—	August 31, 2005	Kitt Peak	Spacewatch	·	2.9 km	MPC · JPL
617513	2005 QB_{192}	—	August 24, 2005	Palomar	NEAT	·	1.2 km	MPC · JPL
617514	2005 QW_{194}	—	August 28, 2005	Kitt Peak	Spacewatch	·	1.2 km	MPC · JPL
617515	2005 QS_{197}	—	October 11, 2010	Mount Lemmon	Mount Lemmon Survey	·	1.6 km	MPC · JPL
617516	2005 QK_{198}	—	November 11, 2010	Mount Lemmon	Mount Lemmon Survey	·	1.4 km	MPC · JPL
617517	2005 QN_{201}	—	August 29, 2005	Kitt Peak	Spacewatch	·	620 m	MPC · JPL
617518	2005 QB_{203}	—	February 11, 2012	Mount Lemmon	Mount Lemmon Survey	·	1.3 km	MPC · JPL
617519	2005 QC_{203}	—	August 31, 2005	Kitt Peak	Spacewatch	·	1.1 km	MPC · JPL
617520	2005 QN_{203}	—	April 3, 2011	Haleakala	Pan-STARRS 1	MAS	490 m	MPC · JPL
617521	2005 QX_{203}	—	August 27, 2005	Palomar	NEAT	·	460 m	MPC · JPL
617522	2005 RW	—	September 3, 2005	Pla D'Arguines	R. Ferrando, Ferrando, M.	·	2.0 km	MPC · JPL
617523	2005 RM_{5}	—	August 25, 2005	Palomar	NEAT	·	540 m	MPC · JPL
617524	2005 RK_{40}	—	August 26, 2005	Anderson Mesa	LONEOS	·	540 m	MPC · JPL
617525	2005 RN_{47}	—	September 23, 2005	Kitt Peak	Spacewatch	NYS	820 m	MPC · JPL
617526	2005 RO_{52}	—	March 23, 2004	Kitt Peak	Spacewatch	·	1.0 km	MPC · JPL
617527	2005 RE_{53}	—	February 26, 2008	Mount Lemmon	Mount Lemmon Survey	·	1.2 km	MPC · JPL
617528	2005 RH_{53}	—	September 4, 2011	Kitt Peak	Spacewatch	·	3.2 km	MPC · JPL
617529	2005 RW_{53}	—	December 31, 2013	Mount Lemmon	Mount Lemmon Survey	·	960 m	MPC · JPL
617530	2005 RW_{56}	—	September 1, 2005	Kitt Peak	Spacewatch	·	560 m	MPC · JPL
617531	2005 RY_{58}	—	September 1, 2005	Palomar	NEAT	V	620 m	MPC · JPL
617532	2005 RN_{59}	—	February 16, 2012	Haleakala	Pan-STARRS 1	·	1.4 km	MPC · JPL
617533	2005 SM_{1}	—	August 29, 2005	Palomar	NEAT	·	1.2 km	MPC · JPL
617534	2005 SD_{10}	—	September 23, 2005	Junk Bond	D. Healy	·	1.4 km	MPC · JPL
617535	2005 SP_{19}	—	August 26, 2005	Palomar	NEAT	·	1.3 km	MPC · JPL
617536	2005 SY_{29}	—	August 30, 2005	Palomar	NEAT	·	1.2 km	MPC · JPL
617537	2005 SQ_{41}	—	September 24, 2005	Kitt Peak	Spacewatch	·	1.4 km	MPC · JPL
617538	2005 SA_{52}	—	September 24, 2005	Kitt Peak	Spacewatch	·	1.5 km	MPC · JPL
617539	2005 SR_{52}	—	August 31, 2005	Palomar	NEAT	·	1.0 km	MPC · JPL
617540	2005 SD_{62}	—	September 26, 2005	Kitt Peak	Spacewatch	MRX	830 m	MPC · JPL
617541	2005 SC_{67}	—	September 24, 2005	Kitt Peak	Spacewatch	·	1.2 km	MPC · JPL
617542	2005 SD_{78}	—	September 24, 2005	Kitt Peak	Spacewatch	·	800 m	MPC · JPL
617543	2005 SY_{82}	—	September 1, 2005	Campo Imperatore	CINEOS	·	690 m	MPC · JPL
617544	2005 SJ_{97}	—	September 1, 2005	Palomar	NEAT	(1547)	1.2 km	MPC · JPL
617545	2005 SX_{111}	—	August 29, 2005	Palomar	NEAT	JUN	920 m	MPC · JPL
617546	2005 SA_{117}	—	August 31, 2005	Palomar	NEAT	·	740 m	MPC · JPL
617547	2005 SL_{135}	—	September 24, 2005	Kitt Peak	Spacewatch	(2076)	880 m	MPC · JPL
617548	2005 SZ_{145}	—	August 31, 2005	Palomar	NEAT	·	970 m	MPC · JPL
617549	2005 SL_{150}	—	September 25, 2005	Kitt Peak	Spacewatch	·	1.3 km	MPC · JPL
617550	2005 SV_{178}	—	September 29, 2005	Kitt Peak	Spacewatch	·	630 m	MPC · JPL
617551	2005 SV_{194}	—	August 29, 2005	Kitt Peak	Spacewatch	·	730 m	MPC · JPL
617552	2005 SD_{205}	—	August 31, 2005	Palomar	NEAT	·	770 m	MPC · JPL
617553	2005 SC_{210}	—	September 21, 2005	Uccle	T. Pauwels	·	1.1 km	MPC · JPL
617554	2005 SB_{211}	—	August 31, 2005	Palomar	NEAT	·	750 m	MPC · JPL
617555	2005 SH_{212}	—	September 30, 2005	Mount Lemmon	Mount Lemmon Survey	·	470 m	MPC · JPL
617556	2005 SG_{223}	—	September 13, 2005	Catalina	CSS	·	920 m	MPC · JPL
617557	2005 SJ_{226}	—	September 30, 2005	Kitt Peak	Spacewatch	V	400 m	MPC · JPL
617558	2005 SN_{227}	—	September 30, 2005	Kitt Peak	Spacewatch	·	1.2 km	MPC · JPL
617559	2005 SE_{229}	—	September 14, 2005	Kitt Peak	Spacewatch	·	830 m	MPC · JPL
617560	2005 SX_{234}	—	September 29, 2005	Kitt Peak	Spacewatch	·	1.6 km	MPC · JPL
617561	2005 SO_{235}	—	September 4, 2000	Kitt Peak	Spacewatch	HOF	1.8 km	MPC · JPL
617562	2005 SO_{238}	—	August 28, 2005	Kitt Peak	Spacewatch	·	1.2 km	MPC · JPL
617563	2005 SL_{240}	—	September 30, 2005	Kitt Peak	Spacewatch	V	520 m	MPC · JPL
617564	2005 SP_{248}	—	September 30, 2005	Mount Lemmon	Mount Lemmon Survey	V	560 m	MPC · JPL
617565	2005 SB_{250}	—	August 26, 2005	Palomar	NEAT	·	700 m	MPC · JPL
617566	2005 SL_{255}	—	August 31, 2005	Kitt Peak	Spacewatch	·	1.5 km	MPC · JPL
617567	2005 SD_{258}	—	September 23, 2005	Kitt Peak	Spacewatch	·	1.7 km	MPC · JPL
617568	2005 SX_{268}	—	September 25, 2005	Kitt Peak	Spacewatch	·	540 m	MPC · JPL
617569	2005 SU_{283}	—	October 1, 2005	Apache Point	SDSS Collaboration	·	960 m	MPC · JPL
617570	2005 SZ_{292}	—	September 24, 2005	Kitt Peak	Spacewatch	·	790 m	MPC · JPL
617571	2005 SN_{295}	—	September 14, 2017	Haleakala	Pan-STARRS 1	T_{j} (2.99) · EUP	3.2 km	MPC · JPL
617572	2005 SU_{295}	—	August 31, 2011	Haleakala	Pan-STARRS 1	·	2.9 km	MPC · JPL
617573	2005 SJ_{299}	—	September 26, 2005	Kitt Peak	Spacewatch	·	640 m	MPC · JPL
617574	2005 TR_{13}	—	September 2, 2005	Palomar	NEAT	PHO	930 m	MPC · JPL
617575	2005 TM_{14}	—	August 27, 2005	Palomar	NEAT	·	800 m	MPC · JPL
617576	2005 TK_{22}	—	October 1, 2005	Mount Lemmon	Mount Lemmon Survey	·	520 m	MPC · JPL
617577	2005 TJ_{30}	—	September 25, 2005	Palomar	NEAT	LUT	6.2 km	MPC · JPL
617578	2005 TK_{34}	—	October 1, 2005	Kitt Peak	Spacewatch	·	620 m	MPC · JPL
617579	2005 TZ_{80}	—	August 30, 2005	Palomar	NEAT	·	1.7 km	MPC · JPL
617580	2005 TP_{82}	—	October 3, 2005	Kitt Peak	Spacewatch	·	1.6 km	MPC · JPL
617581	2005 TR_{84}	—	October 3, 2005	Kitt Peak	Spacewatch	·	1.6 km	MPC · JPL
617582	2005 TF_{85}	—	October 3, 2005	Kitt Peak	Spacewatch	·	1.3 km	MPC · JPL
617583	2005 TX_{93}	—	October 6, 2005	Kitt Peak	Spacewatch	HOF	2.1 km	MPC · JPL
617584	2005 TG_{96}	—	October 6, 2005	Mount Lemmon	Mount Lemmon Survey	·	930 m	MPC · JPL
617585	2005 TQ_{105}	—	September 25, 2005	Kitt Peak	Spacewatch	·	440 m	MPC · JPL
617586	2005 TG_{106}	—	September 29, 2005	Kitt Peak	Spacewatch	·	540 m	MPC · JPL
617587	2005 TF_{107}	—	October 4, 2005	Mount Lemmon	Mount Lemmon Survey	·	1.0 km	MPC · JPL
617588	2005 TW_{117}	—	October 7, 2005	Kitt Peak	Spacewatch	·	1.2 km	MPC · JPL
617589	2005 TP_{121}	—	October 7, 2005	Catalina	CSS	·	1.3 km	MPC · JPL
617590	2005 TW_{142}	—	September 29, 2005	Kitt Peak	Spacewatch	·	590 m	MPC · JPL
617591	2005 TA_{148}	—	October 8, 2005	Kitt Peak	Spacewatch	·	1.4 km	MPC · JPL
617592	2005 TF_{148}	—	October 8, 2005	Kitt Peak	Spacewatch	·	1.3 km	MPC · JPL
617593	2005 TF_{150}	—	October 8, 2005	Kitt Peak	Spacewatch	·	650 m	MPC · JPL
617594	2005 TA_{155}	—	October 9, 2005	Kitt Peak	Spacewatch	·	660 m	MPC · JPL
617595	2005 TV_{155}	—	October 9, 2005	Kitt Peak	Spacewatch	·	670 m	MPC · JPL
617596	2005 TO_{158}	—	October 9, 2005	Kitt Peak	Spacewatch	HOF	2.2 km	MPC · JPL
617597	2005 TX_{177}	—	October 1, 2005	Catalina	CSS	EUN	1.2 km	MPC · JPL
617598	2005 TG_{180}	—	October 1, 2005	Mount Lemmon	Mount Lemmon Survey	AGN	950 m	MPC · JPL
617599	2005 TP_{181}	—	October 1, 2005	Kitt Peak	Spacewatch	·	1.2 km	MPC · JPL
617600	2005 TX_{193}	—	October 1, 2005	Mount Lemmon	Mount Lemmon Survey	·	1.3 km	MPC · JPL

== 617601–617700 ==
back to top

Designation			Discovery			Properties		Ref
Permanent	Provisional	Named after	Date	Site	Discoverer(s)	Category	Diam.	Ref
617601	2005 TD_{195}	—	October 1, 2005	Kitt Peak	Spacewatch	·	1.5 km	MPC · JPL
617602	2005 TK_{200}	—	October 1, 2005	Kitt Peak	Spacewatch	·	1.7 km	MPC · JPL
617603	2005 TV_{201}	—	March 13, 2012	Mount Lemmon	Mount Lemmon Survey	AGN	990 m	MPC · JPL
617604	2005 TF_{202}	—	October 9, 2005	Kitt Peak	Spacewatch	·	650 m	MPC · JPL
617605	2005 TC_{203}	—	December 11, 2012	Mount Lemmon	Mount Lemmon Survey	·	1.1 km	MPC · JPL
617606	2005 TK_{205}	—	October 12, 2005	Kitt Peak	Spacewatch	·	1.6 km	MPC · JPL
617607	2005 TW_{205}	—	June 26, 2015	Haleakala	Pan-STARRS 1	·	570 m	MPC · JPL
617608	2005 TA_{206}	—	August 29, 2014	Mount Lemmon	Mount Lemmon Survey	·	2.0 km	MPC · JPL
617609	2005 TG_{209}	—	November 11, 2010	Mount Lemmon	Mount Lemmon Survey	·	1.3 km	MPC · JPL
617610	2005 TN_{209}	—	October 1, 2005	Mount Lemmon	Mount Lemmon Survey	·	1.1 km	MPC · JPL
617611	2005 TT_{209}	—	October 9, 2005	Kitt Peak	Spacewatch	·	1.7 km	MPC · JPL
617612	2005 TH_{210}	—	September 29, 2011	Kitt Peak	Spacewatch	·	2.1 km	MPC · JPL
617613	2005 TG_{211}	—	October 12, 2005	Kitt Peak	Spacewatch	·	1.6 km	MPC · JPL
617614	2005 TV_{211}	—	November 13, 2010	Mount Lemmon	Mount Lemmon Survey	·	1.5 km	MPC · JPL
617615	2005 TF_{212}	—	September 27, 2014	Mount Lemmon	Mount Lemmon Survey	·	1.4 km	MPC · JPL
617616	2005 TR_{213}	—	October 7, 2005	Mauna Kea	A. Boattini	SUL	1.8 km	MPC · JPL
617617	2005 TQ_{214}	—	October 2, 2005	Mount Lemmon	Mount Lemmon Survey	·	1.5 km	MPC · JPL
617618	2005 TK_{217}	—	October 7, 2005	Kitt Peak	Spacewatch	·	1.3 km	MPC · JPL
617619	2005 UA_{4}	—	October 26, 2005	Mount Graham	Ryan, W. H.	·	1.6 km	MPC · JPL
617620	2005 UW_{8}	—	August 31, 2005	Palomar	NEAT	GEF	1.4 km	MPC · JPL
617621	2005 UN_{32}	—	October 1, 2005	Mount Lemmon	Mount Lemmon Survey	·	1.7 km	MPC · JPL
617622	2005 UV_{32}	—	October 24, 2005	Kitt Peak	Spacewatch	NYS	570 m	MPC · JPL
617623	2005 UR_{40}	—	October 24, 2005	Kitt Peak	Spacewatch	MAS	590 m	MPC · JPL
617624	2005 UK_{57}	—	October 1, 2005	Kitt Peak	Spacewatch	·	640 m	MPC · JPL
617625	2005 UY_{62}	—	October 25, 2005	Mount Lemmon	Mount Lemmon Survey	AGN	960 m	MPC · JPL
617626	2005 UE_{64}	—	October 25, 2005	Catalina	CSS	·	1.4 km	MPC · JPL
617627	2005 UD_{73}	—	October 25, 2005	Kitt Peak	Spacewatch	·	750 m	MPC · JPL
617628	2005 UB_{82}	—	October 11, 2005	Kitt Peak	Spacewatch	·	1.6 km	MPC · JPL
617629	2005 UX_{87}	—	October 1, 2005	Mount Lemmon	Mount Lemmon Survey	·	810 m	MPC · JPL
617630	2005 UL_{132}	—	October 24, 2005	Palomar	NEAT	EUN	1.3 km	MPC · JPL
617631	2005 UP_{134}	—	October 25, 2005	Kitt Peak	Spacewatch	HOF	2.3 km	MPC · JPL
617632	2005 US_{146}	—	October 26, 2005	Kitt Peak	Spacewatch	·	1.6 km	MPC · JPL
617633	2005 UM_{149}	—	October 26, 2005	Kitt Peak	Spacewatch	V	530 m	MPC · JPL
617634	2005 UE_{162}	—	October 27, 2005	Anderson Mesa	LONEOS	·	1.2 km	MPC · JPL
617635	2005 UQ_{167}	—	October 13, 2005	Kitt Peak	Spacewatch	·	1.6 km	MPC · JPL
617636	2005 UO_{188}	—	October 27, 2005	Mount Lemmon	Mount Lemmon Survey	·	660 m	MPC · JPL
617637	2005 UQ_{201}	—	October 25, 2005	Kitt Peak	Spacewatch	·	1.7 km	MPC · JPL
617638	2005 UH_{204}	—	October 25, 2005	Mount Lemmon	Mount Lemmon Survey	·	1.7 km	MPC · JPL
617639	2005 UC_{206}	—	October 27, 2005	Kitt Peak	Spacewatch	HOF	1.9 km	MPC · JPL
617640	2005 UT_{211}	—	October 27, 2005	Kitt Peak	Spacewatch	NYS	910 m	MPC · JPL
617641	2005 UD_{212}	—	October 27, 2005	Kitt Peak	Spacewatch	·	510 m	MPC · JPL
617642	2005 UB_{223}	—	October 25, 2005	Kitt Peak	Spacewatch	·	1.6 km	MPC · JPL
617643	2005 UP_{238}	—	October 25, 2005	Kitt Peak	Spacewatch	·	1.6 km	MPC · JPL
617644	2005 UK_{257}	—	October 25, 2005	Kitt Peak	Spacewatch	·	1.1 km	MPC · JPL
617645	2005 UK_{269}	—	September 29, 2005	Mount Lemmon	Mount Lemmon Survey	·	1.2 km	MPC · JPL
617646	2005 UK_{272}	—	October 28, 2005	Kitt Peak	Spacewatch	HOF	1.9 km	MPC · JPL
617647	2005 UC_{276}	—	October 24, 2005	Kitt Peak	Spacewatch	HOF	2.5 km	MPC · JPL
617648	2005 US_{276}	—	October 24, 2005	Kitt Peak	Spacewatch	·	1.7 km	MPC · JPL
617649	2005 UD_{281}	—	October 25, 2005	Mount Lemmon	Mount Lemmon Survey	·	1.6 km	MPC · JPL
617650	2005 UJ_{285}	—	September 25, 2005	Kitt Peak	Spacewatch	NYS	740 m	MPC · JPL
617651	2005 UA_{290}	—	October 26, 2005	Kitt Peak	Spacewatch	·	1.5 km	MPC · JPL
617652	2005 UC_{305}	—	October 26, 2005	Kitt Peak	Spacewatch	V	550 m	MPC · JPL
617653	2005 UW_{306}	—	October 27, 2005	Mount Lemmon	Mount Lemmon Survey	·	1.1 km	MPC · JPL
617654	2005 UF_{321}	—	October 27, 2005	Kitt Peak	Spacewatch	·	890 m	MPC · JPL
617655	2005 UG_{330}	—	October 28, 2005	Kitt Peak	Spacewatch	·	640 m	MPC · JPL
617656	2005 UL_{335}	—	March 23, 2003	Kitt Peak	Spacewatch	·	1.9 km	MPC · JPL
617657	2005 UT_{338}	—	September 14, 2005	Catalina	CSS	·	980 m	MPC · JPL
617658	2005 UX_{338}	—	October 22, 2005	Kitt Peak	Spacewatch	·	1.0 km	MPC · JPL
617659	2005 UR_{339}	—	October 22, 2005	Kitt Peak	Spacewatch	V	610 m	MPC · JPL
617660	2005 UM_{342}	—	October 31, 2005	Mount Lemmon	Mount Lemmon Survey	·	3.1 km	MPC · JPL
617661	2005 UO_{344}	—	October 29, 2005	Kitt Peak	Spacewatch	·	830 m	MPC · JPL
617662	2005 UE_{363}	—	October 22, 2005	Kitt Peak	Spacewatch	·	1.1 km	MPC · JPL
617663	2005 UB_{376}	—	October 27, 2005	Kitt Peak	Spacewatch	·	1.7 km	MPC · JPL
617664	2005 UN_{379}	—	October 22, 2005	Kitt Peak	Spacewatch	AGN	1.1 km	MPC · JPL
617665	2005 UM_{389}	—	October 11, 2005	Kitt Peak	Spacewatch	AGN	1.0 km	MPC · JPL
617666	2005 UX_{390}	—	October 29, 2005	Mount Lemmon	Mount Lemmon Survey	·	1.6 km	MPC · JPL
617667	2005 UR_{393}	—	October 28, 2005	Catalina	CSS	·	1.7 km	MPC · JPL
617668	2005 UA_{395}	—	September 27, 2005	Kitt Peak	Spacewatch	HOF	2.4 km	MPC · JPL
617669	2005 UW_{398}	—	October 30, 2005	Mount Lemmon	Mount Lemmon Survey	HOF	2.1 km	MPC · JPL
617670	2005 UC_{400}	—	October 26, 2005	Kitt Peak	Spacewatch	·	650 m	MPC · JPL
617671	2005 UZ_{408}	—	October 11, 2005	Kitt Peak	Spacewatch	·	1.5 km	MPC · JPL
617672	2005 UA_{409}	—	October 31, 2005	Mount Lemmon	Mount Lemmon Survey	·	1.8 km	MPC · JPL
617673	2005 US_{413}	—	October 25, 2005	Kitt Peak	Spacewatch	·	820 m	MPC · JPL
617674	2005 UC_{417}	—	October 25, 2005	Kitt Peak	Spacewatch	·	1.6 km	MPC · JPL
617675	2005 UP_{417}	—	October 25, 2005	Kitt Peak	Spacewatch	·	860 m	MPC · JPL
617676	2005 UX_{421}	—	October 27, 2005	Mount Lemmon	Mount Lemmon Survey	·	660 m	MPC · JPL
617677	2005 US_{422}	—	October 27, 2005	Mount Lemmon	Mount Lemmon Survey	·	750 m	MPC · JPL
617678	2005 UX_{431}	—	October 28, 2005	Kitt Peak	Spacewatch	·	1.7 km	MPC · JPL
617679	2005 UY_{432}	—	October 28, 2005	Kitt Peak	Spacewatch	·	1.3 km	MPC · JPL
617680	2005 UX_{452}	—	October 29, 2005	Kitt Peak	Spacewatch	AGN	1.1 km	MPC · JPL
617681	2005 UJ_{462}	—	October 30, 2005	Kitt Peak	Spacewatch	·	1.6 km	MPC · JPL
617682	2005 UY_{466}	—	October 30, 2005	Kitt Peak	Spacewatch	·	890 m	MPC · JPL
617683	2005 UL_{475}	—	October 22, 2005	Kitt Peak	Spacewatch	·	1.1 km	MPC · JPL
617684	2005 UT_{486}	—	September 1, 2005	Palomar	NEAT	JUN	940 m	MPC · JPL
617685	2005 UZ_{490}	—	October 23, 2005	Catalina	CSS	·	940 m	MPC · JPL
617686	2005 UW_{497}	—	October 27, 2005	Socorro	LINEAR	·	1.7 km	MPC · JPL
617687	2005 UB_{522}	—	October 27, 2005	Apache Point	SDSS Collaboration	·	2.7 km	MPC · JPL
617688	2005 UQ_{522}	—	October 25, 2005	Apache Point	SDSS Collaboration	·	560 m	MPC · JPL
617689	2005 UK_{523}	—	December 1, 2005	Mount Lemmon	Mount Lemmon Survey	·	2.4 km	MPC · JPL
617690	2005 UM_{529}	—	September 25, 2005	Kitt Peak	Spacewatch	·	810 m	MPC · JPL
617691	2005 UA_{533}	—	October 24, 2005	Palomar	NEAT	·	2.3 km	MPC · JPL
617692	2005 UF_{534}	—	October 29, 2005	Kitt Peak	Spacewatch	·	1.0 km	MPC · JPL
617693	2005 UN_{534}	—	October 31, 2005	Mauna Kea	A. Boattini	L5	7.4 km	MPC · JPL
617694	2005 US_{534}	—	October 22, 2005	Kitt Peak	Spacewatch	AGN	990 m	MPC · JPL
617695	2005 UB_{535}	—	October 28, 2005	Mount Lemmon	Mount Lemmon Survey	·	1.7 km	MPC · JPL
617696	2005 UU_{535}	—	August 10, 2009	Kitt Peak	Spacewatch	MIS	2.1 km	MPC · JPL
617697	2005 UV_{536}	—	October 18, 2012	Haleakala	Pan-STARRS 1	·	680 m	MPC · JPL
617698	2005 UN_{537}	—	October 27, 2016	Mount Lemmon	Mount Lemmon Survey	·	940 m	MPC · JPL
617699	2005 UJ_{539}	—	October 24, 2005	Kitt Peak	Spacewatch	AEO	1.1 km	MPC · JPL
617700	2005 UV_{539}	—	October 10, 2016	Mount Lemmon	Mount Lemmon Survey	V	530 m	MPC · JPL

== 617701–617800 ==
back to top

Designation			Discovery			Properties		Ref
Permanent	Provisional	Named after	Date	Site	Discoverer(s)	Category	Diam.	Ref
617701	2005 UN_{540}	—	April 4, 2017	Haleakala	Pan-STARRS 1	·	1.7 km	MPC · JPL
617702	2005 UB_{542}	—	October 3, 2014	Mauna Kea	D. J. Tholen	·	1.5 km	MPC · JPL
617703	2005 UW_{543}	—	September 2, 2014	Haleakala	Pan-STARRS 1	AGN	960 m	MPC · JPL
617704	2005 UP_{545}	—	October 29, 2005	Mount Lemmon	Mount Lemmon Survey	·	1.6 km	MPC · JPL
617705	2005 UT_{545}	—	October 24, 2005	Kitt Peak	Spacewatch	HOF	1.9 km	MPC · JPL
617706	2005 UO_{547}	—	October 31, 2005	Kitt Peak	Spacewatch	·	1.6 km	MPC · JPL
617707	2005 UR_{547}	—	October 24, 2005	Mauna Kea	A. Boattini	L5	7.9 km	MPC · JPL
617708	2005 UB_{552}	—	October 22, 2005	Kitt Peak	Spacewatch	V	500 m	MPC · JPL
617709	2005 UK_{552}	—	October 24, 2005	Kitt Peak	Spacewatch	·	1.1 km	MPC · JPL
617710	2005 UK_{553}	—	October 28, 2005	Mount Lemmon	Mount Lemmon Survey	·	910 m	MPC · JPL
617711	2005 VD_{12}	—	October 27, 2005	Kitt Peak	Spacewatch	·	1.9 km	MPC · JPL
617712	2005 VE_{34}	—	November 2, 2005	Mount Lemmon	Mount Lemmon Survey	·	900 m	MPC · JPL
617713	2005 VF_{37}	—	October 25, 2005	Kitt Peak	Spacewatch	·	970 m	MPC · JPL
617714	2005 VF_{51}	—	October 28, 2005	Catalina	CSS	·	670 m	MPC · JPL
617715	2005 VK_{51}	—	October 22, 2005	Catalina	CSS	·	700 m	MPC · JPL
617716	2005 VH_{55}	—	October 29, 2005	Kitt Peak	Spacewatch	·	1.5 km	MPC · JPL
617717	2005 VQ_{57}	—	October 14, 2001	Kitt Peak	Spacewatch	PHO	640 m	MPC · JPL
617718	2005 VC_{59}	—	November 3, 2005	Mount Lemmon	Mount Lemmon Survey	·	1.5 km	MPC · JPL
617719	2005 VE_{73}	—	November 6, 2005	Kitt Peak	Spacewatch	PAD	1.7 km	MPC · JPL
617720	2005 VC_{84}	—	November 4, 2005	Kitt Peak	Spacewatch	HOF	3.0 km	MPC · JPL
617721	2005 VZ_{89}	—	October 25, 2005	Kitt Peak	Spacewatch	·	790 m	MPC · JPL
617722	2005 VR_{100}	—	October 23, 2005	Kitt Peak	Spacewatch	·	1.2 km	MPC · JPL
617723	2005 VY_{107}	—	October 25, 2005	Mount Lemmon	Mount Lemmon Survey	·	1.9 km	MPC · JPL
617724	2005 VQ_{108}	—	October 29, 2005	Kitt Peak	Spacewatch	·	680 m	MPC · JPL
617725	2005 VV_{115}	—	November 11, 2005	Kitt Peak	Spacewatch	AGN	1.1 km	MPC · JPL
617726	2005 VR_{120}	—	November 5, 2005	Catalina	CSS	PHO	1.2 km	MPC · JPL
617727	2005 VN_{127}	—	November 1, 2005	Mount Lemmon	Mount Lemmon Survey	·	2.6 km	MPC · JPL
617728	2005 VQ_{131}	—	October 1, 2005	Apache Point	SDSS Collaboration	·	950 m	MPC · JPL
617729	2005 VS_{138}	—	July 23, 2009	Siding Spring	SSS	·	1.8 km	MPC · JPL
617730	2005 VZ_{138}	—	November 1, 2005	Kitt Peak	Spacewatch	·	1.0 km	MPC · JPL
617731	2005 VB_{139}	—	May 17, 2013	Mount Lemmon	Mount Lemmon Survey	·	1.6 km	MPC · JPL
617732	2005 VQ_{139}	—	December 14, 2010	Mount Lemmon	Mount Lemmon Survey	·	1.6 km	MPC · JPL
617733	2005 VH_{145}	—	April 13, 2011	Haleakala	Pan-STARRS 1	·	880 m	MPC · JPL
617734	2005 VP_{145}	—	October 15, 2012	Haleakala	Pan-STARRS 1	·	930 m	MPC · JPL
617735	2005 VZ_{145}	—	November 5, 2005	Kitt Peak	Spacewatch	HOF	1.8 km	MPC · JPL
617736	2005 VD_{147}	—	October 29, 2014	Kitt Peak	Spacewatch	·	1.5 km	MPC · JPL
617737	2005 VT_{149}	—	September 29, 2014	Haleakala	Pan-STARRS 1	HOF	2.0 km	MPC · JPL
617738	2005 WU	—	November 20, 2005	Catalina	CSS	PHO	2.1 km	MPC · JPL
617739	2005 WA_{17}	—	October 28, 2005	Mount Lemmon	Mount Lemmon Survey	·	1.4 km	MPC · JPL
617740	2005 WC_{17}	—	November 22, 2005	Kitt Peak	Spacewatch	PHO	930 m	MPC · JPL
617741	2005 WJ_{44}	—	October 1, 2005	Mount Lemmon	Mount Lemmon Survey	·	810 m	MPC · JPL
617742	2005 WJ_{49}	—	November 25, 2005	Kitt Peak	Spacewatch	HOF	2.3 km	MPC · JPL
617743	2005 WF_{50}	—	October 25, 2005	Mount Lemmon	Mount Lemmon Survey	MAS	600 m	MPC · JPL
617744	2005 WA_{51}	—	November 25, 2005	Kitt Peak	Spacewatch	·	1.2 km	MPC · JPL
617745	2005 WT_{59}	—	November 30, 2005	Socorro	LINEAR	PHO	1.0 km	MPC · JPL
617746	2005 WJ_{68}	—	October 28, 2005	Kitt Peak	Spacewatch	·	970 m	MPC · JPL
617747	2005 WN_{96}	—	November 26, 2005	Kitt Peak	Spacewatch	·	940 m	MPC · JPL
617748	2005 WQ_{109}	—	November 30, 2005	Kitt Peak	Spacewatch	·	1.9 km	MPC · JPL
617749	2005 WZ_{113}	—	October 31, 2005	Mount Lemmon	Mount Lemmon Survey	·	940 m	MPC · JPL
617750	2005 WR_{127}	—	November 25, 2005	Mount Lemmon	Mount Lemmon Survey	HOF	2.0 km	MPC · JPL
617751	2005 WU_{129}	—	October 25, 2005	Mount Lemmon	Mount Lemmon Survey	DOR	1.6 km	MPC · JPL
617752	2005 WD_{132}	—	November 25, 2005	Mount Lemmon	Mount Lemmon Survey	·	860 m	MPC · JPL
617753	2005 WU_{138}	—	November 26, 2005	Mount Lemmon	Mount Lemmon Survey	HOF	2.6 km	MPC · JPL
617754	2005 WK_{162}	—	November 25, 2005	Mount Lemmon	Mount Lemmon Survey	·	1.6 km	MPC · JPL
617755	2005 WL_{162}	—	November 1, 2005	Mount Lemmon	Mount Lemmon Survey	·	1.6 km	MPC · JPL
617756	2005 WD_{166}	—	October 28, 2005	Socorro	LINEAR	·	1.1 km	MPC · JPL
617757	2005 WU_{167}	—	November 30, 2005	Kitt Peak	Spacewatch	·	1.6 km	MPC · JPL
617758	2005 WW_{171}	—	November 30, 2005	Mount Lemmon	Mount Lemmon Survey	·	540 m	MPC · JPL
617759	2005 WX_{171}	—	November 1, 2005	Kitt Peak	Spacewatch	·	1.5 km	MPC · JPL
617760	2005 WM_{188}	—	November 30, 2005	Kitt Peak	Spacewatch	·	750 m	MPC · JPL
617761	2005 WL_{216}	—	October 1, 2014	Haleakala	Pan-STARRS 1	·	1.8 km	MPC · JPL
617762	2005 WV_{216}	—	November 30, 2005	Kitt Peak	Spacewatch	·	2.5 km	MPC · JPL
617763	2005 XO_{7}	—	November 4, 2005	Kitt Peak	Spacewatch	MAS	510 m	MPC · JPL
617764	2005 XS_{8}	—	October 29, 2005	Kitt Peak	Spacewatch	·	1.7 km	MPC · JPL
617765	2005 XM_{15}	—	December 1, 2005	Mount Lemmon	Mount Lemmon Survey	·	1.4 km	MPC · JPL
617766	2005 XP_{15}	—	October 29, 2005	Mount Lemmon	Mount Lemmon Survey	·	840 m	MPC · JPL
617767	2005 XF_{24}	—	November 26, 2005	Mount Lemmon	Mount Lemmon Survey	·	990 m	MPC · JPL
617768	2005 XV_{42}	—	December 1, 2005	Mount Lemmon	Mount Lemmon Survey	·	890 m	MPC · JPL
617769	2005 XC_{47}	—	December 2, 2005	Kitt Peak	Spacewatch	·	1.2 km	MPC · JPL
617770	2005 XZ_{57}	—	December 2, 2005	Kitt Peak	Spacewatch	·	650 m	MPC · JPL
617771	2005 XF_{69}	—	December 6, 2005	Kitt Peak	Spacewatch	·	1.1 km	MPC · JPL
617772	2005 XW_{70}	—	December 6, 2005	Kitt Peak	Spacewatch	HOF	2.0 km	MPC · JPL
617773	2005 XA_{77}	—	December 8, 2005	Kitt Peak	Spacewatch	·	1.6 km	MPC · JPL
617774	2005 XM_{90}	—	December 8, 2005	Kitt Peak	Spacewatch	·	2.1 km	MPC · JPL
617775	2005 XP_{97}	—	December 1, 2005	Kitt Peak	Wasserman, L. H., Millis, R. L.	·	1.5 km	MPC · JPL
617776	2005 XB_{102}	—	December 1, 2005	Kitt Peak	Wasserman, L. H., Millis, R. L.	·	1.1 km	MPC · JPL
617777	2005 XR_{106}	—	December 1, 2005	Kitt Peak	Wasserman, L. H., Millis, R. L.	L5	6.2 km	MPC · JPL
617778	2005 XW_{106}	—	October 24, 2005	Mauna Kea	A. Boattini	L5	9.0 km	MPC · JPL
617779	2005 XS_{109}	—	December 1, 2005	Mount Lemmon	Mount Lemmon Survey	·	1.6 km	MPC · JPL
617780	2005 XD_{123}	—	December 10, 2005	Kitt Peak	Spacewatch	·	1.0 km	MPC · JPL
617781	2005 XL_{125}	—	June 27, 2015	Haleakala	Pan-STARRS 1	·	810 m	MPC · JPL
617782	2005 XV_{125}	—	December 7, 2005	Kitt Peak	Spacewatch	V	530 m	MPC · JPL
617783	2005 XG_{127}	—	October 31, 2005	Mount Lemmon	Mount Lemmon Survey	·	1.2 km	MPC · JPL
617784	2005 XN_{131}	—	March 7, 2017	Haleakala	Pan-STARRS 1	·	1.5 km	MPC · JPL
617785	2005 XH_{132}	—	December 1, 2005	Mount Lemmon	Mount Lemmon Survey	NYS	950 m	MPC · JPL
617786	2005 YG_{31}	—	December 22, 2005	Kitt Peak	Spacewatch	·	1.7 km	MPC · JPL
617787	2005 YR_{35}	—	December 25, 2005	Kitt Peak	Spacewatch	KOR	1.1 km	MPC · JPL
617788	2005 YS_{44}	—	December 1, 2005	Mount Lemmon	Mount Lemmon Survey	·	2.1 km	MPC · JPL
617789	2005 YQ_{72}	—	December 24, 2005	Kitt Peak	Spacewatch	KOR	1.1 km	MPC · JPL
617790	2005 YT_{74}	—	December 10, 2005	Kitt Peak	Spacewatch	PHO	940 m	MPC · JPL
617791	2005 YW_{84}	—	December 25, 2005	Mount Lemmon	Mount Lemmon Survey	NYS	1.3 km	MPC · JPL
617792	2005 YL_{99}	—	August 13, 2004	Cerro Tololo	Deep Ecliptic Survey	KOR	1.2 km	MPC · JPL
617793	2005 YE_{105}	—	December 25, 2005	Kitt Peak	Spacewatch	·	510 m	MPC · JPL
617794	2005 YN_{109}	—	October 1, 1995	Kitt Peak	Spacewatch	·	1.8 km	MPC · JPL
617795	2005 YX_{111}	—	December 25, 2005	Mount Lemmon	Mount Lemmon Survey	H	350 m	MPC · JPL
617796	2005 YB_{139}	—	December 28, 2005	Kitt Peak	Spacewatch	H	490 m	MPC · JPL
617797	2005 YS_{151}	—	December 26, 2005	Kitt Peak	Spacewatch	PHO	820 m	MPC · JPL
617798	2005 YJ_{153}	—	December 29, 2005	Kitt Peak	Spacewatch	·	1.7 km	MPC · JPL
617799	2005 YY_{162}	—	December 27, 2005	Mount Lemmon	Mount Lemmon Survey	·	640 m	MPC · JPL
617800	2005 YL_{164}	—	December 29, 2005	Kitt Peak	Spacewatch	·	1.9 km	MPC · JPL

== 617801–617900 ==
back to top

Designation			Discovery			Properties		Ref
Permanent	Provisional	Named after	Date	Site	Discoverer(s)	Category	Diam.	Ref
617801	2005 YN_{194}	—	December 31, 2005	Kitt Peak	Spacewatch	·	1.5 km	MPC · JPL
617802	2005 YS_{228}	—	December 5, 2005	Mount Lemmon	Mount Lemmon Survey	MRX	990 m	MPC · JPL
617803	2005 YZ_{247}	—	December 31, 2005	Kitt Peak	Spacewatch	·	730 m	MPC · JPL
617804	2005 YO_{261}	—	December 25, 2005	Kitt Peak	Spacewatch	AGN	1.4 km	MPC · JPL
617805	2005 YY_{261}	—	December 25, 2005	Mount Lemmon	Mount Lemmon Survey	·	1.4 km	MPC · JPL
617806	2005 YW_{262}	—	December 25, 2005	Kitt Peak	Spacewatch	KOR	1.1 km	MPC · JPL
617807	2005 YK_{265}	—	December 26, 2005	Kitt Peak	Spacewatch	·	770 m	MPC · JPL
617808	2005 YM_{267}	—	December 25, 2005	Kitt Peak	Spacewatch	·	840 m	MPC · JPL
617809	2005 YU_{275}	—	January 28, 2014	Mount Lemmon	Mount Lemmon Survey	·	930 m	MPC · JPL
617810	2005 YT_{280}	—	January 26, 2017	Mount Lemmon	Mount Lemmon Survey	V	600 m	MPC · JPL
617811	2005 YH_{288}	—	December 30, 2005	Kitt Peak	Spacewatch	KOR	1.1 km	MPC · JPL
617812	2005 YN_{294}	—	January 10, 2011	Mount Lemmon	Mount Lemmon Survey	·	1.4 km	MPC · JPL
617813	2005 YC_{299}	—	December 17, 2001	Kitt Peak	Spacewatch	MAS	590 m	MPC · JPL
617814	2005 YN_{299}	—	December 27, 2005	Kitt Peak	Spacewatch	·	1.7 km	MPC · JPL
617815	2005 YA_{300}	—	December 21, 2005	Kitt Peak	Spacewatch	NYS	840 m	MPC · JPL
617816	2005 YN_{301}	—	December 25, 2005	Kitt Peak	Spacewatch	·	860 m	MPC · JPL
617817	2006 AB_{11}	—	January 4, 2006	Mount Lemmon	Mount Lemmon Survey	·	480 m	MPC · JPL
617818	2006 AW_{17}	—	October 15, 2001	Apache Point	SDSS Collaboration	·	750 m	MPC · JPL
617819	2006 AO_{24}	—	January 5, 2006	Kitt Peak	Spacewatch	·	2.2 km	MPC · JPL
617820	2006 AM_{55}	—	December 28, 2005	Kitt Peak	Spacewatch	·	2.0 km	MPC · JPL
617821	2006 AW_{59}	—	December 27, 2005	Mount Lemmon	Mount Lemmon Survey	·	2.3 km	MPC · JPL
617822	2006 AP_{88}	—	January 5, 2006	Kitt Peak	Spacewatch	·	1.3 km	MPC · JPL
617823	2006 AQ_{95}	—	January 9, 2006	Kitt Peak	Spacewatch	·	700 m	MPC · JPL
617824	2006 AF_{110}	—	March 6, 2011	Mount Lemmon	Mount Lemmon Survey	AGN	950 m	MPC · JPL
617825	2006 AX_{111}	—	January 30, 2016	Mount Lemmon	Mount Lemmon Survey	·	1.5 km	MPC · JPL
617826	2006 AM_{113}	—	January 12, 2018	Haleakala	Pan-STARRS 1	L5	6.8 km	MPC · JPL
617827	2006 AV_{113}	—	October 16, 2009	Mount Lemmon	Mount Lemmon Survey	KOR	1.0 km	MPC · JPL
617828	2006 BU_{9}	—	January 22, 2006	Mount Lemmon	Mount Lemmon Survey	·	840 m	MPC · JPL
617829	2006 BP_{11}	—	October 25, 2005	Kitt Peak	Spacewatch	·	1.2 km	MPC · JPL
617830	2006 BY_{17}	—	January 22, 2006	Mount Lemmon	Mount Lemmon Survey	·	1.9 km	MPC · JPL
617831	2006 BT_{35}	—	January 23, 2006	Kitt Peak	Spacewatch	·	1.7 km	MPC · JPL
617832	2006 BN_{49}	—	January 25, 2006	Kitt Peak	Spacewatch	·	960 m	MPC · JPL
617833	2006 BJ_{51}	—	January 25, 2006	Kitt Peak	Spacewatch	SUL	1.7 km	MPC · JPL
617834	2006 BM_{70}	—	January 23, 2006	Kitt Peak	Spacewatch	·	1.1 km	MPC · JPL
617835	2006 BN_{75}	—	January 23, 2006	Kitt Peak	Spacewatch	·	980 m	MPC · JPL
617836	2006 BH_{88}	—	January 25, 2006	Kitt Peak	Spacewatch	·	1.1 km	MPC · JPL
617837	2006 BB_{114}	—	January 25, 2006	Kitt Peak	Spacewatch	H	330 m	MPC · JPL
617838	2006 BH_{132}	—	January 26, 2006	Kitt Peak	Spacewatch	KOR	1.2 km	MPC · JPL
617839	2006 BD_{159}	—	January 26, 2006	Kitt Peak	Spacewatch	L5	8.2 km	MPC · JPL
617840	2006 BA_{160}	—	January 26, 2006	Kitt Peak	Spacewatch	PHO	920 m	MPC · JPL
617841	2006 BH_{175}	—	January 27, 2006	Kitt Peak	Spacewatch	·	1.6 km	MPC · JPL
617842	2006 BL_{176}	—	January 23, 2006	Kitt Peak	Spacewatch	·	1.2 km	MPC · JPL
617843	2006 BF_{197}	—	January 30, 2006	Kitt Peak	Spacewatch	L5	7.6 km	MPC · JPL
617844	2006 BL_{222}	—	January 30, 2006	Kitt Peak	Spacewatch	KOR	1.3 km	MPC · JPL
617845	2006 BC_{225}	—	January 30, 2006	Kitt Peak	Spacewatch	PHO	960 m	MPC · JPL
617846	2006 BT_{233}	—	January 23, 2006	Kitt Peak	Spacewatch	NEM	1.7 km	MPC · JPL
617847	2006 BV_{242}	—	January 31, 2006	Kitt Peak	Spacewatch	L5	6.7 km	MPC · JPL
617848	2006 BJ_{246}	—	January 31, 2006	Kitt Peak	Spacewatch	KOR	1.2 km	MPC · JPL
617849	2006 BK_{258}	—	January 13, 2002	Kitt Peak	Spacewatch	·	1.6 km	MPC · JPL
617850	2006 BP_{266}	—	January 6, 2006	Kitt Peak	Spacewatch	·	1.9 km	MPC · JPL
617851	2006 BA_{275}	—	January 26, 2006	Kitt Peak	Spacewatch	L5	10 km	MPC · JPL
617852	2006 BC_{278}	—	January 25, 2006	Kitt Peak	Spacewatch	KOR	1.0 km	MPC · JPL
617853	2006 BG_{287}	—	January 23, 2006	Kitt Peak	Spacewatch	L5	7.3 km	MPC · JPL
617854	2006 BJ_{289}	—	January 23, 2006	Kitt Peak	Spacewatch	L5	8.3 km	MPC · JPL
617855	2006 BD_{291}	—	January 30, 2006	Kitt Peak	Spacewatch	L5	7.5 km	MPC · JPL
617856	2006 BQ_{292}	—	September 28, 2009	Mount Lemmon	Mount Lemmon Survey	·	1.6 km	MPC · JPL
617857	2006 BK_{293}	—	January 26, 2006	Mount Lemmon	Mount Lemmon Survey	L5	7.7 km	MPC · JPL
617858	2006 BJ_{296}	—	October 21, 2014	Kitt Peak	Spacewatch	·	1.5 km	MPC · JPL
617859	2006 CL_{4}	—	January 23, 2006	Mount Lemmon	Mount Lemmon Survey	H	280 m	MPC · JPL
617860	2006 CZ_{15}	—	December 13, 2004	Kitt Peak	Spacewatch	L5	10 km	MPC · JPL
617861	2006 CX_{31}	—	February 2, 2006	Kitt Peak	Spacewatch	L5	9.3 km	MPC · JPL
617862	2006 CO_{33}	—	February 2, 2006	Mount Lemmon	Mount Lemmon Survey	·	1.4 km	MPC · JPL
617863	2006 CB_{45}	—	January 23, 2006	Kitt Peak	Spacewatch	NYS	1 km	MPC · JPL
617864	2006 CV_{72}	—	January 22, 2006	Mount Lemmon	Mount Lemmon Survey	·	1.2 km	MPC · JPL
617865	2006 CD_{78}	—	September 21, 2011	Mount Lemmon	Mount Lemmon Survey	MAS	660 m	MPC · JPL
617866	2006 CY_{84}	—	February 4, 2006	Kitt Peak	Spacewatch	L5	7.2 km	MPC · JPL
617867	2006 CV_{86}	—	April 30, 2014	Haleakala	Pan-STARRS 1	·	1.2 km	MPC · JPL
617868	2006 CS_{87}	—	February 4, 2006	Kitt Peak	Spacewatch	·	1.9 km	MPC · JPL
617869	2006 CR_{88}	—	February 2, 2006	Kitt Peak	Spacewatch	·	980 m	MPC · JPL
617870	2006 DM_{19}	—	February 20, 2006	Kitt Peak	Spacewatch	KOR	1.2 km	MPC · JPL
617871	2006 DK_{24}	—	January 31, 2006	Kitt Peak	Spacewatch	MAS	610 m	MPC · JPL
617872	2006 DR_{37}	—	December 4, 2005	Kitt Peak	Spacewatch	·	1.8 km	MPC · JPL
617873	2006 DJ_{48}	—	January 30, 2006	Kitt Peak	Spacewatch	L5	6.8 km	MPC · JPL
617874	2006 DR_{72}	—	February 4, 2006	Kitt Peak	Spacewatch	L5	6.4 km	MPC · JPL
617875	2006 DF_{76}	—	February 24, 2006	Kitt Peak	Spacewatch	·	1.7 km	MPC · JPL
617876	2006 DN_{88}	—	February 24, 2006	Kitt Peak	Spacewatch	·	1.3 km	MPC · JPL
617877	2006 DU_{125}	—	January 26, 2006	Kitt Peak	Spacewatch	L5	8.7 km	MPC · JPL
617878	2006 DY_{140}	—	February 25, 2006	Kitt Peak	Spacewatch	L5	8.7 km	MPC · JPL
617879	2006 DX_{146}	—	February 25, 2006	Kitt Peak	Spacewatch	·	1.0 km	MPC · JPL
617880	2006 DW_{162}	—	February 27, 2006	Mount Lemmon	Mount Lemmon Survey	L5	6.8 km	MPC · JPL
617881	2006 DB_{171}	—	February 27, 2006	Kitt Peak	Spacewatch	KOR	1.2 km	MPC · JPL
617882	2006 DP_{174}	—	February 27, 2006	Kitt Peak	Spacewatch	L5	10 km	MPC · JPL
617883	2006 DW_{181}	—	February 27, 2006	Kitt Peak	Spacewatch	·	1.6 km	MPC · JPL
617884	2006 DK_{205}	—	February 25, 2006	Mount Lemmon	Mount Lemmon Survey	·	2.0 km	MPC · JPL
617885	2006 DB_{220}	—	April 15, 2007	Mount Lemmon	Mount Lemmon Survey	L5	8.0 km	MPC · JPL
617886	2006 DH_{221}	—	March 12, 2010	Kitt Peak	Spacewatch	·	1.1 km	MPC · JPL
617887	2006 DB_{223}	—	February 27, 2006	Mount Lemmon	Mount Lemmon Survey	L5	6.8 km	MPC · JPL
617888	2006 DR_{223}	—	November 17, 2009	Mount Lemmon	Mount Lemmon Survey	BRA	1.3 km	MPC · JPL
617889	2006 EX_{7}	—	March 2, 2006	Kitt Peak	Spacewatch	·	1.6 km	MPC · JPL
617890	2006 ED_{31}	—	February 27, 2006	Kitt Peak	Spacewatch	KOR	1.4 km	MPC · JPL
617891	2006 ER_{32}	—	March 3, 2006	Kitt Peak	Spacewatch	L5	8.7 km	MPC · JPL
617892	2006 EN_{38}	—	September 26, 2003	Apache Point	SDSS	·	1.3 km	MPC · JPL
617893	2006 ET_{49}	—	March 4, 2006	Kitt Peak	Spacewatch	L5	7.9 km	MPC · JPL
617894	2006 EF_{80}	—	October 15, 2012	Haleakala	Pan-STARRS 1	L5	7.6 km	MPC · JPL
617895	2006 EH_{81}	—	February 17, 2013	Kitt Peak	Spacewatch	·	560 m	MPC · JPL
617896	2006 EV_{81}	—	March 6, 2006	Mount Lemmon	Mount Lemmon Survey	·	1.5 km	MPC · JPL
617897	2006 FY_{1}	—	March 23, 2006	Mount Lemmon	Mount Lemmon Survey	H	450 m	MPC · JPL
617898	2006 FQ_{38}	—	March 23, 2006	Kitt Peak	Spacewatch	·	1.4 km	MPC · JPL
617899	2006 GL_{59}	—	April 2, 2006	Kitt Peak	Spacewatch	·	1.5 km	MPC · JPL
617900	2006 HO_{26}	—	April 20, 2006	Kitt Peak	Spacewatch	EOS	1.7 km	MPC · JPL

== 617901–618000 ==
back to top

Designation			Discovery			Properties		Ref
Permanent	Provisional	Named after	Date	Site	Discoverer(s)	Category	Diam.	Ref
617901	2006 HD_{85}	—	April 27, 2006	Kitt Peak	Spacewatch	·	1.0 km	MPC · JPL
617902	2006 HL_{97}	—	April 30, 2006	Kitt Peak	Spacewatch	EOS	1.3 km	MPC · JPL
617903	2006 HR_{129}	—	January 30, 2006	Kitt Peak	Spacewatch	·	1.4 km	MPC · JPL
617904	2006 HY_{136}	—	April 26, 2006	Cerro Tololo	Deep Ecliptic Survey	·	1.7 km	MPC · JPL
617905	2006 HO_{148}	—	May 26, 2006	Mount Lemmon	Mount Lemmon Survey	·	1.9 km	MPC · JPL
617906	2006 JG_{59}	—	May 1, 2006	Kitt Peak	Deep Ecliptic Survey	·	1.7 km	MPC · JPL
617907	2006 JF_{60}	—	May 1, 2006	Kitt Peak	Deep Ecliptic Survey	·	1.7 km	MPC · JPL
617908	2006 JZ_{62}	—	May 1, 2006	Kitt Peak	Deep Ecliptic Survey	·	1.8 km	MPC · JPL
617909	2006 JP_{85}	—	October 1, 2013	Kitt Peak	Spacewatch	·	2.4 km	MPC · JPL
617910	2006 KV_{58}	—	April 30, 2006	Kitt Peak	Spacewatch	·	2.1 km	MPC · JPL
617911	2006 KV_{87}	—	May 24, 2006	Kitt Peak	Spacewatch	·	2.0 km	MPC · JPL
617912	2006 KW_{90}	—	July 4, 2003	Kitt Peak	Spacewatch	PHO	1.1 km	MPC · JPL
617913	2006 KD_{91}	—	May 24, 2006	Mount Lemmon	Mount Lemmon Survey	·	610 m	MPC · JPL
617914	2006 KF_{98}	—	May 26, 2006	Kitt Peak	Spacewatch	EMA	2.5 km	MPC · JPL
617915	2006 KE_{119}	—	May 31, 2006	Kitt Peak	Spacewatch	NAE	2.4 km	MPC · JPL
617916	2006 KC_{124}	—	May 21, 2006	Kitt Peak	Spacewatch	H	420 m	MPC · JPL
617917	2006 KQ_{129}	—	May 25, 2006	Mauna Kea	P. A. Wiegert	·	1.3 km	MPC · JPL
617918	2006 KT_{132}	—	March 10, 2005	Mount Lemmon	Mount Lemmon Survey	·	1.9 km	MPC · JPL
617919	2006 KW_{147}	—	May 26, 2006	Mount Lemmon	Mount Lemmon Survey	H	330 m	MPC · JPL
617920	2006 KB_{151}	—	June 22, 2015	Haleakala	Pan-STARRS 1	·	980 m	MPC · JPL
617921	2006 KM_{153}	—	April 21, 2009	Mount Lemmon	Mount Lemmon Survey	·	630 m	MPC · JPL
617922	2006 KQ_{153}	—	April 6, 2011	Mount Lemmon	Mount Lemmon Survey	EOS	1.8 km	MPC · JPL
617923	2006 LE_{8}	—	November 1, 2008	Mount Lemmon	Mount Lemmon Survey	·	1.7 km	MPC · JPL
617924	2006 LJ_{8}	—	March 30, 2011	Haleakala	Pan-STARRS 1	T_{j} (2.99)	3.2 km	MPC · JPL
617925	2006 LK_{9}	—	May 22, 2014	Mount Lemmon	Mount Lemmon Survey	·	830 m	MPC · JPL
617926	2006 MO_{10}	—	June 19, 2006	Mount Lemmon	Mount Lemmon Survey	·	550 m	MPC · JPL
617927	2006 MQ_{11}	—	April 21, 2006	Kitt Peak	Spacewatch	EOS	2.0 km	MPC · JPL
617928	2006 MB_{16}	—	March 6, 2013	Haleakala	Pan-STARRS 1	·	1.1 km	MPC · JPL
617929	2006 MJ_{16}	—	May 26, 2014	Haleakala	Pan-STARRS 1	H	440 m	MPC · JPL
617930	2006 MQ_{16}	—	April 22, 2009	Mount Lemmon	Mount Lemmon Survey	·	580 m	MPC · JPL
617931	2006 ON_{15}	—	June 18, 2006	Palomar	NEAT	·	1.5 km	MPC · JPL
617932	2006 OH_{24}	—	January 15, 2008	Kitt Peak	Spacewatch	·	580 m	MPC · JPL
617933	2006 OQ_{37}	—	July 19, 2006	Mauna Kea	P. A. Wiegert, D. Subasinghe	(5)	960 m	MPC · JPL
617934	2006 OD_{39}	—	July 5, 2017	Haleakala	Pan-STARRS 1	·	2.2 km	MPC · JPL
617935	2006 OJ_{39}	—	June 5, 2018	Haleakala	Pan-STARRS 1	·	1.0 km	MPC · JPL
617936	2006 OS_{39}	—	October 20, 2016	Mount Lemmon	Mount Lemmon Survey	·	620 m	MPC · JPL
617937	2006 PK_{10}	—	August 13, 2006	Palomar	NEAT	·	1.3 km	MPC · JPL
617938	2006 PD_{44}	—	July 29, 2014	Haleakala	Pan-STARRS 1	·	950 m	MPC · JPL
617939	2006 QL_{16}	—	August 17, 2006	Palomar	NEAT	·	3.3 km	MPC · JPL
617940	2006 QH_{28}	—	July 29, 2006	Siding Spring	SSS	·	1.9 km	MPC · JPL
617941	2006 QX_{62}	—	August 24, 2006	Socorro	LINEAR	·	570 m	MPC · JPL
617942	2006 QH_{68}	—	August 21, 2006	Kitt Peak	Spacewatch	·	550 m	MPC · JPL
617943	2006 QS_{71}	—	August 21, 2006	Kitt Peak	Spacewatch	·	590 m	MPC · JPL
617944	2006 QS_{81}	—	August 24, 2006	Palomar	NEAT	·	640 m	MPC · JPL
617945	2006 QS_{83}	—	August 19, 2006	Kitt Peak	Spacewatch	·	720 m	MPC · JPL
617946	2006 QB_{89}	—	August 18, 2006	Kitt Peak	Spacewatch	·	580 m	MPC · JPL
617947	2006 QN_{92}	—	July 25, 2006	Mount Lemmon	Mount Lemmon Survey	·	550 m	MPC · JPL
617948	2006 QC_{110}	—	August 28, 2006	Kitt Peak	Spacewatch	EOS	1.5 km	MPC · JPL
617949	2006 QS_{125}	—	August 28, 2006	Anderson Mesa	LONEOS	·	550 m	MPC · JPL
617950	2006 QB_{136}	—	August 18, 2006	Kitt Peak	Spacewatch	·	2.5 km	MPC · JPL
617951	2006 QA_{152}	—	August 19, 2006	Kitt Peak	Spacewatch	·	1.9 km	MPC · JPL
617952	2006 QW_{159}	—	August 19, 2006	Kitt Peak	Spacewatch	·	2.5 km	MPC · JPL
617953	2006 QN_{160}	—	August 19, 2006	Kitt Peak	Spacewatch	·	1.1 km	MPC · JPL
617954	2006 QU_{168}	—	November 24, 2003	Kitt Peak	Spacewatch	·	610 m	MPC · JPL
617955	2006 QC_{174}	—	August 22, 2006	Cerro Tololo	Deep Ecliptic Survey	EUN	780 m	MPC · JPL
617956	2006 QD_{186}	—	August 28, 2006	Kitt Peak	Spacewatch	MIS	1.9 km	MPC · JPL
617957	2006 QY_{187}	—	August 19, 2006	Kitt Peak	Spacewatch	·	1.0 km	MPC · JPL
617958	2006 QK_{189}	—	August 27, 2006	Kitt Peak	Spacewatch	·	640 m	MPC · JPL
617959	2006 QG_{190}	—	August 22, 2006	Palomar	NEAT	·	1.3 km	MPC · JPL
617960	2006 QA_{191}	—	August 19, 2006	Kitt Peak	Spacewatch	·	1.3 km	MPC · JPL
617961	2006 QO_{192}	—	August 29, 2006	Kitt Peak	Spacewatch	(883)	570 m	MPC · JPL
617962	2006 QP_{192}	—	August 28, 2006	Kitt Peak	Spacewatch	·	530 m	MPC · JPL
617963	2006 QQ_{194}	—	December 27, 2011	Kitt Peak	Spacewatch	·	1.1 km	MPC · JPL
617964	2006 QQ_{198}	—	March 18, 2013	Mount Lemmon	Mount Lemmon Survey	·	1.3 km	MPC · JPL
617965	2006 QK_{199}	—	March 29, 2012	Mount Lemmon	Mount Lemmon Survey	·	420 m	MPC · JPL
617966	2006 QT_{201}	—	August 29, 2006	Catalina	CSS	·	1.2 km	MPC · JPL
617967	2006 RG_{14}	—	September 14, 2006	Kitt Peak	Spacewatch	·	650 m	MPC · JPL
617968	2006 RW_{18}	—	September 14, 2006	Palomar	NEAT	·	700 m	MPC · JPL
617969	2006 RO_{24}	—	September 14, 2006	Kitt Peak	Spacewatch	EOS	1.7 km	MPC · JPL
617970	2006 RK_{25}	—	August 29, 2006	Kitt Peak	Spacewatch	·	1.6 km	MPC · JPL
617971	2006 RE_{27}	—	September 14, 2006	Catalina	CSS	·	880 m	MPC · JPL
617972	2006 RL_{41}	—	August 29, 2006	Kitt Peak	Spacewatch	T_{j} (2.98) · 3:2 · SHU	5.2 km	MPC · JPL
617973	2006 RA_{45}	—	September 14, 2006	Kitt Peak	Spacewatch	·	2.7 km	MPC · JPL
617974	2006 RY_{47}	—	September 14, 2006	Palomar	NEAT	·	1.3 km	MPC · JPL
617975	2006 RK_{53}	—	September 14, 2006	Kitt Peak	Spacewatch	(5)	990 m	MPC · JPL
617976	2006 RH_{75}	—	September 15, 2006	Kitt Peak	Spacewatch	·	500 m	MPC · JPL
617977	2006 RK_{76}	—	September 15, 2006	Kitt Peak	Spacewatch	·	510 m	MPC · JPL
617978	2006 RP_{102}	—	September 13, 2006	Palomar	NEAT	H	540 m	MPC · JPL
617979	2006 RL_{104}	—	September 15, 2006	Kitt Peak	Spacewatch	TIR	2.2 km	MPC · JPL
617980	2006 RN_{111}	—	September 30, 2006	Kitt Peak	Spacewatch	·	1.3 km	MPC · JPL
617981	2006 RF_{117}	—	September 14, 2006	Mauna Kea	Masiero, J., R. Jedicke	·	960 m	MPC · JPL
617982	2006 SS_{10}	—	September 16, 2006	Kitt Peak	Spacewatch	·	2.5 km	MPC · JPL
617983	2006 SC_{27}	—	September 16, 2006	Catalina	CSS	·	1.3 km	MPC · JPL
617984	2006 SK_{46}	—	September 19, 2006	Anderson Mesa	LONEOS	EUN	780 m	MPC · JPL
617985	2006 SL_{76}	—	September 19, 2006	Kitt Peak	Spacewatch	·	1.2 km	MPC · JPL
617986	2006 SF_{126}	—	September 21, 2006	Anderson Mesa	LONEOS	·	760 m	MPC · JPL
617987	2006 SP_{146}	—	September 19, 2006	Kitt Peak	Spacewatch	·	520 m	MPC · JPL
617988	2006 SN_{154}	—	September 21, 2006	Bergisch Gladbach	W. Bickel	·	1.3 km	MPC · JPL
617989	2006 SR_{170}	—	September 17, 2006	Kitt Peak	Spacewatch	·	990 m	MPC · JPL
617990	2006 SK_{189}	—	May 4, 2000	Apache Point	SDSS	·	1.5 km	MPC · JPL
617991	2006 SW_{191}	—	September 19, 2006	Kitt Peak	Spacewatch	·	1.2 km	MPC · JPL
617992	2006 SJ_{193}	—	September 26, 2006	Catalina	CSS	·	3.2 km	MPC · JPL
617993	2006 SA_{227}	—	September 26, 2006	Kitt Peak	Spacewatch	·	590 m	MPC · JPL
617994	2006 SX_{233}	—	September 18, 2006	Kitt Peak	Spacewatch	·	1.1 km	MPC · JPL
617995	2006 SK_{275}	—	September 27, 2006	Mount Lemmon	Mount Lemmon Survey	·	830 m	MPC · JPL
617996	2006 SR_{293}	—	September 17, 2006	Kitt Peak	Spacewatch	·	830 m	MPC · JPL
617997	2006 SQ_{300}	—	September 26, 2006	Kitt Peak	Spacewatch	·	570 m	MPC · JPL
617998	2006 ST_{302}	—	October 23, 2003	Kitt Peak	Deep Ecliptic Survey	·	590 m	MPC · JPL
617999	2006 SG_{324}	—	September 17, 2006	Kitt Peak	Spacewatch	·	1.1 km	MPC · JPL
618000	2006 SE_{330}	—	September 27, 2006	Kitt Peak	Spacewatch	·	490 m	MPC · JPL

back to top

== Meaning of names ==
As minor planet discoveries are confirmed, they are given a permanent number by the IAU's Minor Planet Center (MPC), and the discoverers can then submit names for them, following the IAU's naming conventions. The list below concerns those minor planets in the specified number-range that have received names, and explains the meanings of those names.

Official naming citations of newly named small Solar System bodies are approved and published in a bulletin by IAU's Working Group for Small Bodies Nomenclature (WGSBN). Before May 2021, citations were published in MPC's Minor Planet Circulars for many decades. Recent citations can also be found on the JPL Small-Body Database (SBDB). Until his death in 2016, German astronomer Lutz D. Schmadel compiled these citations into the Dictionary of Minor Planet Names (DMP) and regularly updated the collection.

Based on Paul Herget's The Names of the Minor Planets, Schmadel also researched the unclear origin of numerous asteroids, most of which had been named prior to World War II. This article incorporates text from this source, which is in the public domain: SBDB New namings may only be added to this list below after official publication as the preannouncement of names is condemned. The WGSBN publishes a comprehensive guideline for the naming rules of non-cometary small Solar System bodies.

Named minor planet	Provisional	This minor planet was named for...	Ref · Catalog
617080 Nögel	2002 YH_{36}	Otto Nögel, German teacher and amateur astronomer.	IAU · 617080
617403 Boley	2005 BT_{47}	Aaron C. Boley, Canadian Associate Professor and Canada Research Chair in Planetary Astronomy at the Department of Physics and Astronomy of the University of British Columbia.	IAU · 617403
