= List of minor planets: 846001–847000 =

The following is a partial list of minor planets, running from minor-planet number 846001 through 847000, inclusive. The primary data for this and other partial lists is based on JPL's "Small-Body Orbital Elements" and data available from the Minor Planet Center. Critical list information is also provided by the MPC, unless otherwise specified from Lowell Observatory. A detailed description of the table's columns and additional sources are given on the main page including a complete list of every page in this series, and a statistical break-up on the dynamical classification of minor planets.

Also see the summary list of all named bodies in numerical and alphabetical order, and the corresponding naming citations for the number range of this particular list. New namings may only be added to this list after official publication, as the preannouncement of names is condemned by the Working Group for Small Bodies Nomenclature of the International Astronomical Union.

Near-Earth obj.	MBA (inner)	MBA (outer)	Centaur
Mars-crosser	MBA (middle)	Jupiter trojan	Trans-Neptunian obj.
Unclassified

== 846001–846100 ==
Designation			Discovery			Properties		Ref
Permanent	Provisional	Named after	Date	Site	Discoverer(s)	Category	Diam.	Ref
846001	2018 UX_{34}	—	September 19, 1998	Sacramento Peak	SDSS	·	1.7 km	MPC · JPL
846002	2018 UP_{36}	—	October 18, 2018	Mount Lemmon	Mount Lemmon Survey	·	1.6 km	MPC · JPL
846003	2018 VU_{11}	—	September 28, 1994	Kitt Peak	Spacewatch	3:2 · SHU	3.9 km	MPC · JPL
846004	2018 VA_{14}	—	July 22, 2010	WISE	WISE	T_{j} (2.93) · 3:2 · critical	3.5 km	MPC · JPL
846005	2018 VG_{15}	—	November 25, 2013	XuYi	PMO NEO Survey Program	·	1.7 km	MPC · JPL
846006	2018 VQ_{16}	—	October 23, 2001	Palomar	NEAT	·	1.4 km	MPC · JPL
846007	2018 VL_{23}	—	October 8, 2007	Catalina	CSS	·	930 m	MPC · JPL
846008	2018 VN_{23}	—	September 25, 2011	Catalina	CSS	·	950 m	MPC · JPL
846009	2018 VR_{34}	—	March 28, 2016	Mount Lemmon	Mount Lemmon Survey	·	1.3 km	MPC · JPL
846010	2018 VM_{38}	—	October 14, 2001	Sacramento Peak	SDSS	·	2.5 km	MPC · JPL
846011	2018 VV_{40}	—	October 4, 2002	Palomar	NEAT	·	2.0 km	MPC · JPL
846012	2018 VE_{42}	—	January 17, 2013	Haleakala	Pan-STARRS 1	·	450 m	MPC · JPL
846013	2018 VU_{44}	—	August 28, 2014	Haleakala	Pan-STARRS 1	·	860 m	MPC · JPL
846014	2018 VN_{45}	—	September 17, 2012	Mount Lemmon	Mount Lemmon Survey	·	2.3 km	MPC · JPL
846015	2018 VW_{46}	—	November 10, 2009	Mount Lemmon	Mount Lemmon Survey	·	1.7 km	MPC · JPL
846016	2018 VQ_{47}	—	April 13, 2016	Mount Lemmon	Mount Lemmon Survey	EOS	1.3 km	MPC · JPL
846017	2018 VA_{58}	—	March 16, 2012	Kitt Peak	Spacewatch	H	410 m	MPC · JPL
846018	2018 VB_{58}	—	December 25, 2011	Piszkés-tető	K. Sárneczky, S. Kürti	·	660 m	MPC · JPL
846019	2018 VC_{58}	—	October 23, 2011	Kitt Peak	Spacewatch	·	740 m	MPC · JPL
846020	2018 VN_{61}	—	July 8, 2014	Haleakala	Pan-STARRS 1	V	440 m	MPC · JPL
846021	2018 VE_{62}	—	March 21, 1999	Sacramento Peak	SDSS	KON	2.5 km	MPC · JPL
846022	2018 VW_{63}	—	June 9, 2010	WISE	WISE	·	2.6 km	MPC · JPL
846023	2018 VZ_{63}	—	December 31, 2007	Kitt Peak	Spacewatch	NYS	870 m	MPC · JPL
846024	2018 VT_{65}	—	October 5, 2002	Sacramento Peak	SDSS	EOS	2.0 km	MPC · JPL
846025	2018 VX_{65}	—	September 2, 2008	Kitt Peak	Spacewatch	·	1.3 km	MPC · JPL
846026	2018 VD_{71}	—	April 30, 2016	Haleakala	Pan-STARRS 1	·	970 m	MPC · JPL
846027	2018 VD_{78}	—	April 10, 2010	WISE	WISE	·	1.2 km	MPC · JPL
846028	2018 VM_{79}	—	October 4, 2002	Sacramento Peak	SDSS	·	1.4 km	MPC · JPL
846029	2018 VQ_{79}	—	September 15, 2007	Catalina	CSS	·	2.3 km	MPC · JPL
846030	2018 VZ_{79}	—	October 5, 2002	Sacramento Peak	SDSS	·	1.5 km	MPC · JPL
846031	2018 VA_{85}	—	October 24, 2001	Kitt Peak	Spacewatch	·	3.7 km	MPC · JPL
846032	2018 VK_{86}	—	February 11, 2010	WISE	WISE	·	1.3 km	MPC · JPL
846033	2018 VM_{86}	—	October 15, 2018	Haleakala	Pan-STARRS 2	·	1.4 km	MPC · JPL
846034	2018 VG_{90}	—	November 1, 2018	Mount Lemmon	Mount Lemmon Survey	·	2.2 km	MPC · JPL
846035	2018 VL_{90}	—	September 29, 2009	Mount Lemmon	Mount Lemmon Survey	·	1.3 km	MPC · JPL
846036	2018 VY_{92}	—	November 1, 2018	Mount Lemmon	Mount Lemmon Survey	·	2.0 km	MPC · JPL
846037	2018 VQ_{97}	—	October 14, 2007	Kitt Peak	Spacewatch	·	760 m	MPC · JPL
846038	2018 VS_{98}	—	September 25, 2008	Kitt Peak	Spacewatch	·	1.6 km	MPC · JPL
846039	2018 VE_{107}	—	November 17, 2014	Haleakala	Pan-STARRS 1	(5)	890 m	MPC · JPL
846040	2018 VG_{121}	—	July 25, 2014	Haleakala	Pan-STARRS 1	·	830 m	MPC · JPL
846041	2018 VJ_{123}	—	November 1, 2018	Mount Lemmon	Mount Lemmon Survey	·	1.8 km	MPC · JPL
846042	2018 VN_{124}	—	May 1, 2016	Cerro Tololo	DECam	·	1.1 km	MPC · JPL
846043	2018 VO_{124}	—	July 26, 2017	Haleakala	Pan-STARRS 1	·	1.8 km	MPC · JPL
846044	2018 VC_{125}	—	November 7, 2018	Mount Lemmon	Mount Lemmon Survey	·	1.4 km	MPC · JPL
846045	2018 VR_{126}	—	May 1, 2016	Cerro Tololo	DECam	·	1.1 km	MPC · JPL
846046	2018 VU_{128}	—	September 14, 2018	Mount Lemmon	Mount Lemmon Survey	·	2.6 km	MPC · JPL
846047	2018 VU_{130}	—	November 8, 2018	Mount Lemmon	Mount Lemmon Survey	·	860 m	MPC · JPL
846048	2018 VC_{133}	—	November 2, 2018	Mount Lemmon	Mount Lemmon Survey	·	800 m	MPC · JPL
846049	2018 VD_{138}	—	November 14, 2018	Haleakala	Pan-STARRS 2	·	1.8 km	MPC · JPL
846050	2018 VS_{139}	—	November 9, 2018	Mount Lemmon	Mount Lemmon Survey	·	2.1 km	MPC · JPL
846051	2018 VU_{140}	—	April 30, 2016	Haleakala	Pan-STARRS 1	·	1.9 km	MPC · JPL
846052	2018 VE_{141}	—	November 9, 2018	Mount Lemmon	Mount Lemmon Survey	·	560 m	MPC · JPL
846053	2018 VF_{151}	—	November 5, 2018	Haleakala	Pan-STARRS 2	·	1.7 km	MPC · JPL
846054	2018 VD_{154}	—	November 2, 2018	Haleakala	Pan-STARRS 2	·	1.1 km	MPC · JPL
846055	2018 VB_{158}	—	November 1, 2018	Haleakala	Pan-STARRS 2	·	2.1 km	MPC · JPL
846056	2018 VY_{167}	—	November 6, 2018	Mount Lemmon	Mount Lemmon Survey	·	1.1 km	MPC · JPL
846057	2018 VT_{177}	—	September 16, 2012	Catalina	CSS	THB	2.4 km	MPC · JPL
846058	2018 VF_{184}	—	November 6, 2018	Haleakala	Pan-STARRS 2	H	370 m	MPC · JPL
846059	2018 VZ_{202}	—	November 5, 2018	Haleakala	Pan-STARRS 2	·	1.3 km	MPC · JPL
846060	2018 WB_{7}	—	November 17, 2018	Mount Lemmon	Mount Lemmon Survey	EOS	1.3 km	MPC · JPL
846061	2018 WG_{7}	—	April 24, 2014	Cerro Tololo	DECam	·	530 m	MPC · JPL
846062	2018 WW_{8}	—	November 28, 2018	Mount Lemmon	Mount Lemmon Survey	TIR	1.8 km	MPC · JPL
846063	2018 WQ_{11}	—	November 29, 2018	Mount Lemmon	Mount Lemmon Survey	·	1.4 km	MPC · JPL
846064	2018 XR_{1}	—	October 12, 2015	Mount Lemmon	Mount Lemmon Survey	H	340 m	MPC · JPL
846065	2018 XJ_{7}	—	December 2, 2005	Kitt Peak	Spacewatch	·	1.6 km	MPC · JPL
846066	2018 XM_{7}	—	December 27, 2014	Space Surveillance	Space Surveillance Telescope	·	870 m	MPC · JPL
846067	2018 XO_{9}	—	December 13, 2018	Mount Lemmon	Mount Lemmon Survey	·	1.3 km	MPC · JPL
846068	2018 XQ_{10}	—	October 1, 2003	Kitt Peak	Spacewatch	MAS	480 m	MPC · JPL
846069	2018 XL_{12}	—	August 13, 2012	Siding Spring	SSS	·	1.7 km	MPC · JPL
846070	2018 XW_{17}	—	November 26, 2009	Kitt Peak	Spacewatch	·	1.5 km	MPC · JPL
846071	2018 XJ_{19}	—	October 16, 2009	Mount Lemmon	Mount Lemmon Survey	·	1.2 km	MPC · JPL
846072	2018 XP_{20}	—	December 4, 2018	Mount Lemmon	Mount Lemmon Survey	H	400 m	MPC · JPL
846073	2018 XS_{20}	—	December 13, 2018	Haleakala	Pan-STARRS 1	H	440 m	MPC · JPL
846074	2018 XW_{22}	—	December 14, 2018	Haleakala	Pan-STARRS 1	THB	1.7 km	MPC · JPL
846075	2018 XY_{27}	—	December 10, 2018	Mount Lemmon	Mount Lemmon Survey	H	450 m	MPC · JPL
846076	2018 XE_{32}	—	December 10, 2018	Mount Lemmon	Mount Lemmon Survey	HNS	740 m	MPC · JPL
846077	2018 XV_{32}	—	December 12, 2018	Haleakala	Pan-STARRS 1	·	2.1 km	MPC · JPL
846078	2018 XS_{35}	—	December 12, 2018	Haleakala	Pan-STARRS 1	·	1.4 km	MPC · JPL
846079	2018 XG_{52}	—	December 12, 2018	Haleakala	Pan-STARRS 1	·	1.3 km	MPC · JPL
846080	2018 YZ_{2}	—	December 17, 2018	Haleakala	Pan-STARRS 1	AMO	560 m	MPC · JPL
846081	2018 YE_{4}	—	January 31, 2009	Mount Lemmon	Mount Lemmon Survey	·	570 m	MPC · JPL
846082	2018 YR_{4}	—	June 30, 2010	WISE	WISE	·	1.1 km	MPC · JPL
846083	2018 YX_{4}	—	December 5, 2015	Haleakala	Pan-STARRS 1	·	1.3 km	MPC · JPL
846084	2018 YH_{8}	—	January 18, 2010	WISE	WISE	·	1.5 km	MPC · JPL
846085	2018 YY_{8}	—	December 16, 2018	Haleakala	Pan-STARRS 1	·	1.3 km	MPC · JPL
846086	2018 YO_{10}	—	December 20, 2018	Haleakala	Pan-STARRS 1	H	430 m	MPC · JPL
846087	2018 YW_{14}	—	December 17, 2018	Haleakala	Pan-STARRS 1	·	1.8 km	MPC · JPL
846088	2019 AD_{7}	—	December 30, 2013	Haleakala	Pan-STARRS 1	H	310 m	MPC · JPL
846089	2019 AE_{10}	—	March 8, 2014	Mount Lemmon	Mount Lemmon Survey	H	330 m	MPC · JPL
846090	2019 AD_{20}	—	January 18, 2015	Haleakala	Pan-STARRS 1	JUN	760 m	MPC · JPL
846091	2019 AF_{20}	—	March 20, 2010	WISE	WISE	·	1.7 km	MPC · JPL
846092	2019 AK_{21}	—	October 12, 1999	Kitt Peak	Spacewatch	·	1.3 km	MPC · JPL
846093	2019 AL_{27}	—	January 8, 2019	Haleakala	Pan-STARRS 1	·	1.2 km	MPC · JPL
846094	2019 AU_{27}	—	June 12, 2010	WISE	WISE	·	3.1 km	MPC · JPL
846095	2019 AB_{30}	—	May 5, 2010	WISE	WISE	·	1.6 km	MPC · JPL
846096	2019 AD_{30}	—	April 14, 2010	WISE	WISE	·	2.2 km	MPC · JPL
846097	2019 AN_{44}	—	January 22, 2015	Haleakala	Pan-STARRS 1	·	1.4 km	MPC · JPL
846098	2019 AX_{44}	—	March 3, 2008	XuYi Statio	PMO NEO Survey Program	·	1.9 km	MPC · JPL
846099	2019 AP_{48}	—	January 4, 2019	Mount Lemmon	Mount Lemmon Survey	·	1.4 km	MPC · JPL
846100	2019 AV_{48}	—	January 3, 2019	Haleakala	Pan-STARRS 1	·	1.8 km	MPC · JPL

== 846101–846200 ==
back to top

Designation			Discovery			Properties		Ref
Permanent	Provisional	Named after	Date	Site	Discoverer(s)	Category	Diam.	Ref
846101	2019 AY_{53}	—	January 3, 2019	Haleakala	Pan-STARRS 1	·	1.1 km	MPC · JPL
846102	2019 AN_{54}	—	January 9, 2019	Haleakala	Pan-STARRS 1	·	470 m	MPC · JPL
846103	2019 AS_{54}	—	January 2, 2019	Haleakala	Pan-STARRS 1	NYS	760 m	MPC · JPL
846104	2019 AB_{55}	—	January 14, 2019	Haleakala	Pan-STARRS 1	(194)	1.2 km	MPC · JPL
846105	2019 AM_{56}	—	January 3, 2019	Haleakala	Pan-STARRS 1	HNS	730 m	MPC · JPL
846106	2019 AR_{57}	—	January 6, 2019	Haleakala	Pan-STARRS 1	EUN	790 m	MPC · JPL
846107	2019 AD_{60}	—	January 8, 2019	Haleakala	Pan-STARRS 1	·	1.8 km	MPC · JPL
846108	2019 AS_{60}	—	January 7, 2019	Haleakala	Pan-STARRS 1	PHO	800 m	MPC · JPL
846109	2019 AY_{61}	—	January 4, 2019	Haleakala	Pan-STARRS 1	H	450 m	MPC · JPL
846110	2019 AM_{63}	—	January 19, 2015	Haleakala	Pan-STARRS 1	EUN	850 m	MPC · JPL
846111	2019 AH_{67}	—	January 9, 2019	Haleakala	Pan-STARRS 1	·	1.8 km	MPC · JPL
846112	2019 AT_{77}	—	January 11, 2019	Haleakala	Pan-STARRS 1	H	390 m	MPC · JPL
846113	2019 AP_{81}	—	January 7, 2019	Haleakala	Pan-STARRS 1	·	3.0 km	MPC · JPL
846114	2019 AR_{88}	—	January 12, 2019	Haleakala	Pan-STARRS 1	·	1.4 km	MPC · JPL
846115	2019 AF_{89}	—	January 8, 2019	Haleakala	Pan-STARRS 1	MAR	630 m	MPC · JPL
846116	2019 AQ_{90}	—	January 12, 2019	Haleakala	Pan-STARRS 1	·	1.5 km	MPC · JPL
846117	2019 AM_{92}	—	January 11, 2019	Haleakala	Pan-STARRS 1	NYS	900 m	MPC · JPL
846118	2019 AQ_{92}	—	January 12, 2019	Haleakala	Pan-STARRS 1	BRA	1.1 km	MPC · JPL
846119	2019 AM_{98}	—	November 30, 2005	Mount Lemmon	Mount Lemmon Survey	JUN	640 m	MPC · JPL
846120	2019 AC_{108}	—	January 3, 2019	Haleakala	Pan-STARRS 1	HOF	1.8 km	MPC · JPL
846121	2019 AV_{122}	—	January 13, 2019	Haleakala	Pan-STARRS 1	·	1.1 km	MPC · JPL
846122	2019 AW_{131}	—	January 12, 2019	Haleakala	Pan-STARRS 1	·	2.3 km	MPC · JPL
846123	2019 AC_{140}	—	January 10, 2019	Haleakala	Pan-STARRS 1	·	1.5 km	MPC · JPL
846124	2019 BD_{2}	—	July 26, 2015	Haleakala	Pan-STARRS 1	H	330 m	MPC · JPL
846125	2019 BT_{4}	—	January 26, 2019	Mount Lemmon	Mount Lemmon Survey	H	330 m	MPC · JPL
846126	2019 BK_{5}	—	January 3, 2019	Haleakala	Pan-STARRS 1	BAR	1.0 km	MPC · JPL
846127	2019 BY_{5}	—	January 9, 2010	Mount Lemmon	Mount Lemmon Survey	·	2.2 km	MPC · JPL
846128	2019 BX_{6}	—	March 6, 2010	WISE	WISE	·	1.7 km	MPC · JPL
846129	2019 BT_{8}	—	March 25, 2011	Catalina	CSS	·	290 m	MPC · JPL
846130	2019 BV_{13}	—	January 16, 2019	Haleakala	Pan-STARRS 1	·	1.6 km	MPC · JPL
846131	2019 CS_{3}	—	January 8, 2019	Haleakala	Pan-STARRS 1	H	410 m	MPC · JPL
846132	2019 CK_{11}	—	February 4, 2019	Haleakala	Pan-STARRS 1	·	1.9 km	MPC · JPL
846133	2019 CO_{13}	—	February 8, 2019	Mount Lemmon	Mount Lemmon Survey	H	300 m	MPC · JPL
846134	2019 CX_{13}	—	March 29, 2015	Haleakala	Pan-STARRS 1	·	1.4 km	MPC · JPL
846135	2019 CB_{15}	—	February 5, 2019	Haleakala	Pan-STARRS 1	H	340 m	MPC · JPL
846136	2019 CC_{15}	—	January 30, 2012	Kitt Peak	Spacewatch	NYS	820 m	MPC · JPL
846137	2019 CU_{16}	—	February 12, 2019	Mount Lemmon	Mount Lemmon Survey	H	350 m	MPC · JPL
846138	2019 CM_{21}	—	January 28, 2015	Haleakala	Pan-STARRS 1	·	1.0 km	MPC · JPL
846139	2019 CQ_{24}	—	February 4, 2019	Haleakala	Pan-STARRS 1	·	1.7 km	MPC · JPL
846140	2019 CT_{28}	—	February 5, 2019	Haleakala	Pan-STARRS 2	T_{j} (2.99) · EUP	2.4 km	MPC · JPL
846141	2019 CY_{28}	—	February 9, 2019	Mount Lemmon	Mount Lemmon Survey	·	1.4 km	MPC · JPL
846142	2019 CW_{32}	—	February 4, 2019	Haleakala	Pan-STARRS 1	·	1.9 km	MPC · JPL
846143	2019 DD_{3}	—	February 28, 2019	Mount Lemmon	Mount Lemmon Survey	·	820 m	MPC · JPL
846144	2019 EJ_{2}	—	February 18, 2010	Kitt Peak	Spacewatch	·	2.2 km	MPC · JPL
846145	2019 EH_{4}	—	March 15, 2019	Mount Lemmon	Mount Lemmon Survey	·	570 m	MPC · JPL
846146	2019 EK_{4}	—	March 15, 2019	Cerro Paranal	Gaia Ground Based Optical Tracking	·	1.3 km	MPC · JPL
846147	2019 EH_{5}	—	March 15, 2019	Mount Lemmon	Mount Lemmon Survey	·	2.6 km	MPC · JPL
846148	2019 EM_{5}	—	March 1, 2019	Cerro Paranal	Gaia Ground Based Optical Tracking	EUN	890 m	MPC · JPL
846149	2019 EV_{7}	—	August 3, 2016	Haleakala	Pan-STARRS 1	·	1.2 km	MPC · JPL
846150	2019 FQ_{5}	—	March 17, 2019	Mount Lemmon	Mount Lemmon Survey	·	2.4 km	MPC · JPL
846151	2019 FB_{11}	—	March 29, 2019	Mount Lemmon	Mount Lemmon Survey	EUP	2.2 km	MPC · JPL
846152	2019 FZ_{15}	—	March 30, 2015	Haleakala	Pan-STARRS 1	·	1.1 km	MPC · JPL
846153	2019 FS_{18}	—	March 29, 2019	Mount Lemmon	Mount Lemmon Survey	·	1.9 km	MPC · JPL
846154	2019 FU_{18}	—	March 31, 2019	Mount Lemmon	Mount Lemmon Survey	·	2.3 km	MPC · JPL
846155	2019 FD_{19}	—	March 31, 2019	Mount Lemmon	Mount Lemmon Survey	·	880 m	MPC · JPL
846156	2019 FN_{19}	—	March 28, 2019	Kitt Peak	Spacewatch	(895)	1.9 km	MPC · JPL
846157	2019 FL_{20}	—	March 31, 2019	Mount Lemmon	Mount Lemmon Survey	·	510 m	MPC · JPL
846158	2019 FX_{20}	—	March 31, 2019	Mount Lemmon	Mount Lemmon Survey	H	340 m	MPC · JPL
846159	2019 FS_{21}	—	March 31, 2019	Mount Lemmon	Mount Lemmon Survey	MAS	540 m	MPC · JPL
846160	2019 FG_{25}	—	March 29, 2019	Mount Lemmon	Mount Lemmon Survey	LIX	2.0 km	MPC · JPL
846161	2019 FC_{27}	—	March 31, 2019	Mount Lemmon	Mount Lemmon Survey	·	1.4 km	MPC · JPL
846162	2019 FJ_{27}	—	April 18, 2015	Cerro Tololo	DECam	·	1.1 km	MPC · JPL
846163	2019 FS_{27}	—	May 20, 2015	Cerro Tololo	DECam	·	1.3 km	MPC · JPL
846164	2019 FN_{28}	—	March 29, 2019	Mount Lemmon	Mount Lemmon Survey	·	1.7 km	MPC · JPL
846165	2019 FQ_{30}	—	March 29, 2019	Mount Lemmon	Mount Lemmon Survey	·	1.5 km	MPC · JPL
846166	2019 FO_{31}	—	March 29, 2019	Mount Lemmon	Mount Lemmon Survey	critical	1.8 km	MPC · JPL
846167	2019 GR_{8}	—	January 20, 2015	Haleakala	Pan-STARRS 1	·	1.1 km	MPC · JPL
846168	2019 GQ_{15}	—	January 28, 2014	Mount Lemmon	Mount Lemmon Survey	·	1.6 km	MPC · JPL
846169	2019 GY_{19}	—	April 5, 2019	Haleakala	Pan-STARRS 1	AMO	150 m	MPC · JPL
846170	2019 GC_{22}	—	April 14, 2008	Kitt Peak	Spacewatch	·	2.6 km	MPC · JPL
846171	2019 GB_{26}	—	July 27, 2010	WISE	WISE	EOS	1.5 km	MPC · JPL
846172	2019 GC_{26}	—	April 2, 2019	Haleakala	Pan-STARRS 1	·	1.4 km	MPC · JPL
846173	2019 GP_{27}	—	April 5, 2019	Haleakala	Pan-STARRS 1	T_{j} (2.98)	2.2 km	MPC · JPL
846174	2019 GH_{28}	—	April 6, 2019	Haleakala	Pan-STARRS 1	·	1.6 km	MPC · JPL
846175	2019 GL_{31}	—	April 4, 2019	Haleakala	Pan-STARRS 1	TIR	1.8 km	MPC · JPL
846176	2019 GA_{35}	—	April 3, 2019	Haleakala	Pan-STARRS 1	LIX	2.3 km	MPC · JPL
846177	2019 GK_{40}	—	October 17, 2012	Haleakala	Pan-STARRS 1	·	1.2 km	MPC · JPL
846178	2019 GQ_{42}	—	April 7, 2019	Haleakala	Pan-STARRS 1	·	2.0 km	MPC · JPL
846179	2019 GW_{42}	—	April 5, 2019	Haleakala	Pan-STARRS 1	H	370 m	MPC · JPL
846180	2019 GQ_{44}	—	April 4, 2019	Haleakala	Pan-STARRS 1	EUP	2.0 km	MPC · JPL
846181	2019 GE_{47}	—	April 2, 2019	Haleakala	Pan-STARRS 1	·	2.0 km	MPC · JPL
846182	2019 GG_{48}	—	April 3, 2019	Haleakala	Pan-STARRS 1	V	450 m	MPC · JPL
846183	2019 GB_{52}	—	April 5, 2019	Haleakala	Pan-STARRS 1	·	2.0 km	MPC · JPL
846184	2019 GU_{52}	—	April 2, 2019	Haleakala	Pan-STARRS 1	EUN	990 m	MPC · JPL
846185	2019 GR_{53}	—	December 2, 2008	Kitt Peak	Spacewatch	·	1.3 km	MPC · JPL
846186	2019 GM_{55}	—	April 2, 2019	Haleakala	Pan-STARRS 1	·	1.3 km	MPC · JPL
846187	2019 GN_{56}	—	April 2, 2019	Haleakala	Pan-STARRS 1	·	1.4 km	MPC · JPL
846188	2019 GY_{56}	—	April 3, 2019	Haleakala	Pan-STARRS 1	SUL	1.3 km	MPC · JPL
846189	2019 GB_{57}	—	April 4, 2019	Mount Lemmon	Mount Lemmon Survey	EUN	760 m	MPC · JPL
846190	2019 GX_{57}	—	April 5, 2014	Haleakala	Pan-STARRS 1	EOS	1.2 km	MPC · JPL
846191	2019 GJ_{58}	—	April 5, 2019	Haleakala	Pan-STARRS 1	·	1.5 km	MPC · JPL
846192	2019 GN_{59}	—	April 3, 2019	Haleakala	Pan-STARRS 1	L5	6.0 km	MPC · JPL
846193	2019 GC_{60}	—	April 3, 2019	Haleakala	Pan-STARRS 1	·	1.3 km	MPC · JPL
846194	2019 GH_{61}	—	January 31, 2009	Kitt Peak	Spacewatch	·	470 m	MPC · JPL
846195	2019 GX_{61}	—	April 3, 2019	Haleakala	Pan-STARRS 1	·	1.3 km	MPC · JPL
846196	2019 GZ_{61}	—	April 3, 2019	Haleakala	Pan-STARRS 1	TIR	2.1 km	MPC · JPL
846197	2019 GA_{68}	—	April 3, 2019	Haleakala	Pan-STARRS 1	·	1.1 km	MPC · JPL
846198	2019 GL_{69}	—	April 5, 2019	Haleakala	Pan-STARRS 1	L5	5.6 km	MPC · JPL
846199	2019 GR_{69}	—	April 6, 2019	Haleakala	Pan-STARRS 1	·	1.5 km	MPC · JPL
846200	2019 GU_{71}	—	April 6, 2019	Haleakala	Pan-STARRS 1	·	2.4 km	MPC · JPL

== 846201–846300 ==
back to top

Designation			Discovery			Properties		Ref
Permanent	Provisional	Named after	Date	Site	Discoverer(s)	Category	Diam.	Ref
846201	2019 GC_{72}	—	April 3, 2019	Haleakala	Pan-STARRS 1	·	1.3 km	MPC · JPL
846202	2019 GK_{72}	—	April 3, 2019	Haleakala	Pan-STARRS 1	·	1.2 km	MPC · JPL
846203	2019 GM_{74}	—	April 4, 2019	Haleakala	Pan-STARRS 1	·	1.1 km	MPC · JPL
846204	2019 GO_{84}	—	April 4, 2019	Haleakala	Pan-STARRS 1	V	430 m	MPC · JPL
846205	2019 GW_{88}	—	April 7, 2019	Haleakala	Pan-STARRS 1	KOR	1.1 km	MPC · JPL
846206	2019 GK_{90}	—	April 2, 2019	Haleakala	Pan-STARRS 1	·	1.2 km	MPC · JPL
846207	2019 GZ_{91}	—	October 29, 2010	Mauna Kea	M. Micheli	·	1.9 km	MPC · JPL
846208	2019 GD_{92}	—	April 4, 2019	Haleakala	Pan-STARRS 1	T_{j} (2.94)	4.4 km	MPC · JPL
846209	2019 GQ_{92}	—	April 2, 2019	Haleakala	Pan-STARRS 1	·	700 m	MPC · JPL
846210	2019 GG_{94}	—	April 6, 2019	Haleakala	Pan-STARRS 1	·	1.8 km	MPC · JPL
846211	2019 GW_{96}	—	August 2, 2016	Haleakala	Pan-STARRS 1	·	1.2 km	MPC · JPL
846212	2019 GT_{97}	—	April 3, 2019	Haleakala	Pan-STARRS 1	·	1.1 km	MPC · JPL
846213	2019 GZ_{101}	—	December 12, 2017	Haleakala	Pan-STARRS 1	·	1.2 km	MPC · JPL
846214	2019 GU_{111}	—	April 5, 2019	Haleakala	Pan-STARRS 1	EOS	1.3 km	MPC · JPL
846215	2019 GL_{112}	—	April 2, 2019	Haleakala	Pan-STARRS 1	·	980 m	MPC · JPL
846216	2019 GU_{112}	—	April 2, 2019	Haleakala	Pan-STARRS 1	·	1.4 km	MPC · JPL
846217	2019 GW_{119}	—	April 7, 2019	Haleakala	Pan-STARRS 1	·	1.4 km	MPC · JPL
846218	2019 GV_{121}	—	May 23, 2014	Haleakala	Pan-STARRS 1	·	1.7 km	MPC · JPL
846219	2019 GZ_{121}	—	April 2, 2019	Haleakala	Pan-STARRS 1	·	1.4 km	MPC · JPL
846220	2019 GF_{122}	—	April 6, 2019	Haleakala	Pan-STARRS 1	·	1.2 km	MPC · JPL
846221	2019 GK_{123}	—	May 20, 2015	Cerro Tololo	DECam	MRX	660 m	MPC · JPL
846222	2019 GS_{123}	—	April 3, 2019	Haleakala	Pan-STARRS 1	KOR	930 m	MPC · JPL
846223	2019 GT_{123}	—	April 3, 2019	Haleakala	Pan-STARRS 1	KOR	900 m	MPC · JPL
846224	2019 GN_{124}	—	May 20, 2015	Cerro Tololo	DECam	·	1.3 km	MPC · JPL
846225	2019 GB_{125}	—	May 20, 2015	Cerro Tololo	DECam	WIT	610 m	MPC · JPL
846226	2019 GD_{125}	—	April 3, 2019	Haleakala	Pan-STARRS 1	·	1.5 km	MPC · JPL
846227	2019 GL_{125}	—	April 2, 2019	Haleakala	Pan-STARRS 1	AGN	820 m	MPC · JPL
846228	2019 GW_{125}	—	April 4, 2019	Haleakala	Pan-STARRS 1	·	1.5 km	MPC · JPL
846229	2019 GH_{126}	—	March 15, 2012	Mount Lemmon	Mount Lemmon Survey	·	520 m	MPC · JPL
846230	2019 GX_{127}	—	October 21, 2006	Mount Lemmon	Mount Lemmon Survey	·	1.6 km	MPC · JPL
846231	2019 GN_{129}	—	April 2, 2019	Haleakala	Pan-STARRS 1	·	1.4 km	MPC · JPL
846232	2019 GZ_{133}	—	October 18, 2012	Haleakala	Pan-STARRS 1	·	1.4 km	MPC · JPL
846233	2019 GW_{134}	—	October 13, 2010	Mount Lemmon	Mount Lemmon Survey	·	2.3 km	MPC · JPL
846234	2019 GT_{135}	—	January 25, 2009	Kitt Peak	Spacewatch	KOR	1.0 km	MPC · JPL
846235	2019 GO_{136}	—	April 2, 2019	Haleakala	Pan-STARRS 1	HOF	2.0 km	MPC · JPL
846236	2019 GD_{137}	—	February 27, 2014	Mount Lemmon	Mount Lemmon Survey	·	1.4 km	MPC · JPL
846237	2019 GF_{138}	—	April 2, 2019	Haleakala	Pan-STARRS 1	·	560 m	MPC · JPL
846238	2019 GY_{143}	—	April 3, 2019	Haleakala	Pan-STARRS 1	·	1.1 km	MPC · JPL
846239	2019 GN_{146}	—	April 5, 2019	Haleakala	Pan-STARRS 1	L5	6.4 km	MPC · JPL
846240	2019 GP_{151}	—	April 5, 2019	Haleakala	Pan-STARRS 1	·	1.7 km	MPC · JPL
846241	2019 GM_{153}	—	January 30, 2017	Mount Lemmon	Mount Lemmon Survey	L5	8.1 km	MPC · JPL
846242	2019 GU_{153}	—	January 14, 2018	Haleakala	Pan-STARRS 1	VER	1.8 km	MPC · JPL
846243	2019 GV_{159}	—	August 3, 2016	Haleakala	Pan-STARRS 1	MAS	560 m	MPC · JPL
846244	2019 GY_{172}	—	April 5, 2019	Haleakala	Pan-STARRS 1	L5	6.0 km	MPC · JPL
846245	2019 GT_{174}	—	April 6, 2019	Haleakala	Pan-STARRS 1	EOS	1.3 km	MPC · JPL
846246	2019 GM_{179}	—	April 3, 2019	Haleakala	Pan-STARRS 1	·	1.7 km	MPC · JPL
846247	2019 GS_{198}	—	April 2, 2019	Haleakala	Pan-STARRS 1	·	1.9 km	MPC · JPL
846248	2019 HU	—	June 12, 2010	WISE	WISE	·	1.8 km	MPC · JPL
846249	2019 HH_{8}	—	April 25, 2019	Mount Lemmon	Mount Lemmon Survey	·	2.6 km	MPC · JPL
846250	2019 HL_{8}	—	April 26, 2019	Mount Lemmon	Mount Lemmon Survey	·	940 m	MPC · JPL
846251	2019 HA_{9}	—	April 24, 2019	Haleakala	Pan-STARRS 1	·	1.2 km	MPC · JPL
846252	2019 HC_{10}	—	April 25, 2019	Mount Lemmon	Mount Lemmon Survey	·	1.2 km	MPC · JPL
846253	2019 HT_{13}	—	April 24, 2019	Haleakala	Pan-STARRS 1	·	1.8 km	MPC · JPL
846254	2019 JW_{3}	—	September 24, 2017	Mount Lemmon	Mount Lemmon Survey	H	320 m	MPC · JPL
846255	2019 JR_{10}	—	January 24, 2014	Haleakala	Pan-STARRS 1	·	1.3 km	MPC · JPL
846256	2019 JQ_{11}	—	June 12, 2015	Haleakala	Pan-STARRS 1	·	1.0 km	MPC · JPL
846257	2019 JR_{14}	—	October 24, 2013	Mount Lemmon	Mount Lemmon Survey	·	490 m	MPC · JPL
846258	2019 JL_{20}	—	April 3, 2019	Haleakala	Pan-STARRS 1	·	1.3 km	MPC · JPL
846259	2019 JX_{26}	—	January 13, 2013	Mount Lemmon	Mount Lemmon Survey	·	1.3 km	MPC · JPL
846260	2019 JN_{33}	—	May 8, 2019	Haleakala	Pan-STARRS 1	·	1.3 km	MPC · JPL
846261	2019 JG_{41}	—	January 19, 2010	WISE	WISE	T_{j} (2.96)	2.0 km	MPC · JPL
846262	2019 JC_{42}	—	January 14, 2010	WISE	WISE	·	790 m	MPC · JPL
846263	2019 JF_{45}	—	May 4, 2014	Haleakala	Pan-STARRS 1	·	1.4 km	MPC · JPL
846264	2019 JK_{45}	—	January 10, 2008	Mount Lemmon	Mount Lemmon Survey	·	1.2 km	MPC · JPL
846265	2019 JG_{47}	—	May 8, 2019	Haleakala	Pan-STARRS 1	·	1.3 km	MPC · JPL
846266	2019 JF_{48}	—	March 14, 2010	WISE	WISE	·	1.2 km	MPC · JPL
846267	2019 JA_{50}	—	May 1, 2019	Haleakala	Pan-STARRS 1	TIR	1.8 km	MPC · JPL
846268	2019 JR_{52}	—	May 6, 2019	Haleakala	Pan-STARRS 1	·	2.1 km	MPC · JPL
846269	2019 JZ_{55}	—	May 1, 2019	Haleakala	Pan-STARRS 1	·	490 m	MPC · JPL
846270	2019 JW_{57}	—	May 1, 2019	Haleakala	Pan-STARRS 1	·	1.7 km	MPC · JPL
846271	2019 JC_{61}	—	May 6, 2019	Haleakala	Pan-STARRS 1	·	1.6 km	MPC · JPL
846272	2019 JV_{62}	—	May 1, 2019	Haleakala	Pan-STARRS 1	·	910 m	MPC · JPL
846273	2019 JZ_{62}	—	May 1, 2019	Haleakala	Pan-STARRS 1	·	840 m	MPC · JPL
846274	2019 JA_{65}	—	May 8, 2019	Haleakala	Pan-STARRS 1	EOS	1.3 km	MPC · JPL
846275	2019 JC_{65}	—	May 1, 2019	Haleakala	Pan-STARRS 1	·	1.6 km	MPC · JPL
846276	2019 JV_{65}	—	May 1, 2019	Haleakala	Pan-STARRS 1	·	1.6 km	MPC · JPL
846277	2019 JZ_{65}	—	May 12, 2019	Haleakala	Pan-STARRS 1	·	1.2 km	MPC · JPL
846278	2019 JL_{66}	—	February 7, 2013	Kitt Peak	Spacewatch	·	1.9 km	MPC · JPL
846279	2019 JW_{66}	—	May 1, 2019	Haleakala	Pan-STARRS 1	VER	1.9 km	MPC · JPL
846280	2019 JH_{69}	—	May 9, 2019	Haleakala	Pan-STARRS 1	·	1.6 km	MPC · JPL
846281	2019 JJ_{69}	—	May 9, 2019	Haleakala	Pan-STARRS 1	EOS	1.2 km	MPC · JPL
846282	2019 JD_{70}	—	May 21, 2014	Haleakala	Pan-STARRS 1	·	1.4 km	MPC · JPL
846283	2019 JN_{70}	—	May 8, 2019	Haleakala	Pan-STARRS 1	·	1.2 km	MPC · JPL
846284	2019 JU_{70}	—	July 19, 2015	Haleakala	Pan-STARRS 1	EOS	1.2 km	MPC · JPL
846285	2019 JZ_{70}	—	May 7, 2019	Haleakala	Pan-STARRS 1	·	1.4 km	MPC · JPL
846286	2019 JW_{72}	—	May 1, 2019	Haleakala	Pan-STARRS 1	THM	1.6 km	MPC · JPL
846287	2019 JG_{73}	—	May 1, 2019	Haleakala	Pan-STARRS 1	·	2.1 km	MPC · JPL
846288	2019 JE_{74}	—	May 1, 2019	Haleakala	Pan-STARRS 1	·	1.2 km	MPC · JPL
846289	2019 JM_{74}	—	May 5, 2019	Cerro Tololo-DECam	DECam	·	1.8 km	MPC · JPL
846290	2019 JN_{74}	—	May 1, 2019	Haleakala	Pan-STARRS 1	·	1.7 km	MPC · JPL
846291	2019 JO_{74}	—	May 1, 2019	Haleakala	Pan-STARRS 1	·	1.7 km	MPC · JPL
846292	2019 JM_{75}	—	May 12, 2019	Haleakala	Pan-STARRS 1	·	1.8 km	MPC · JPL
846293	2019 JT_{75}	—	May 20, 2014	Haleakala	Pan-STARRS 1	KOR	950 m	MPC · JPL
846294	2019 JV_{75}	—	May 8, 2019	Haleakala	Pan-STARRS 1	·	1.9 km	MPC · JPL
846295	2019 JD_{77}	—	May 7, 2019	Haleakala	Pan-STARRS 1	·	1.3 km	MPC · JPL
846296	2019 JO_{77}	—	May 9, 2019	Haleakala	Pan-STARRS 1	EOS	1.2 km	MPC · JPL
846297	2019 JA_{80}	—	May 7, 2019	Haleakala	Pan-STARRS 1	·	1.3 km	MPC · JPL
846298	2019 JF_{81}	—	May 9, 2019	Haleakala	Pan-STARRS 1	PHO	590 m	MPC · JPL
846299	2019 JA_{82}	—	May 7, 2019	Haleakala	Pan-STARRS 1	·	1.9 km	MPC · JPL
846300	2019 JZ_{83}	—	May 11, 2019	Haleakala	Pan-STARRS 1	·	1.6 km	MPC · JPL

== 846301–846400 ==
back to top

Designation			Discovery			Properties		Ref
Permanent	Provisional	Named after	Date	Site	Discoverer(s)	Category	Diam.	Ref
846301	2019 JN_{84}	—	May 8, 2019	Haleakala	Pan-STARRS 1	·	700 m	MPC · JPL
846302	2019 JN_{94}	—	May 3, 2019	Mount Lemmon	Mount Lemmon Survey	·	1.2 km	MPC · JPL
846303	2019 JR_{100}	—	May 23, 2014	Haleakala	Pan-STARRS 1	·	1.4 km	MPC · JPL
846304	2019 JN_{107}	—	April 23, 2014	Cerro Tololo	DECam	·	1.3 km	MPC · JPL
846305	2019 JG_{112}	—	October 27, 2016	Mount Lemmon	Mount Lemmon Survey	·	750 m	MPC · JPL
846306	2019 JA_{144}	—	May 2, 2019	Haleakala	Pan-STARRS 1	EOS	1.2 km	MPC · JPL
846307	2019 KK_{10}	—	May 28, 2019	Mount Lemmon	Mount Lemmon Survey	·	790 m	MPC · JPL
846308	2019 KZ_{10}	—	April 17, 2010	WISE	WISE	·	990 m	MPC · JPL
846309	2019 KS_{11}	—	October 2, 2010	Mount Lemmon	Mount Lemmon Survey	·	1.8 km	MPC · JPL
846310	2019 KZ_{12}	—	May 30, 2019	Haleakala	Pan-STARRS 1	EOS	1.3 km	MPC · JPL
846311	2019 KY_{13}	—	May 26, 2019	Haleakala	Pan-STARRS 1	·	1.6 km	MPC · JPL
846312	2019 KD_{14}	—	October 2, 2006	Mount Lemmon	Mount Lemmon Survey	·	510 m	MPC · JPL
846313	2019 KQ_{17}	—	February 28, 2008	Mount Lemmon	Mount Lemmon Survey	·	1.6 km	MPC · JPL
846314	2019 KV_{18}	—	June 14, 2010	WISE	WISE	·	1.4 km	MPC · JPL
846315	2019 KX_{18}	—	May 27, 2019	Haleakala	Pan-STARRS 1	EOS	1.3 km	MPC · JPL
846316	2019 KD_{20}	—	May 30, 2019	Haleakala	Pan-STARRS 1	·	1.6 km	MPC · JPL
846317	2019 KZ_{20}	—	May 29, 2019	Haleakala	Pan-STARRS 1	H	420 m	MPC · JPL
846318	2019 KE_{22}	—	April 10, 2015	Mount Lemmon	Mount Lemmon Survey	·	740 m	MPC · JPL
846319	2019 KK_{25}	—	May 26, 2019	Mount Lemmon	Mount Lemmon Survey	·	2.0 km	MPC · JPL
846320	2019 KQ_{25}	—	May 25, 2019	Haleakala	Pan-STARRS 1	·	2.0 km	MPC · JPL
846321	2019 KY_{25}	—	May 30, 2019	Haleakala	Pan-STARRS 1	·	1.6 km	MPC · JPL
846322	2019 KF_{27}	—	May 26, 2019	Haleakala	Pan-STARRS 1	EOS	1.4 km	MPC · JPL
846323	2019 KL_{27}	—	May 28, 2019	Mount Lemmon	Mount Lemmon Survey	·	1.7 km	MPC · JPL
846324	2019 KQ_{28}	—	May 30, 2019	Haleakala	Pan-STARRS 1	·	1.8 km	MPC · JPL
846325	2019 KY_{28}	—	May 29, 2019	Haleakala	Pan-STARRS 1	·	1.6 km	MPC · JPL
846326	2019 KY_{33}	—	May 27, 2019	Haleakala	Pan-STARRS 1	·	1.8 km	MPC · JPL
846327	2019 KV_{34}	—	May 30, 2019	Haleakala	Pan-STARRS 1	·	1.5 km	MPC · JPL
846328	2019 KW_{38}	—	May 27, 2019	Haleakala	Pan-STARRS 1	·	1 km	MPC · JPL
846329	2019 KZ_{38}	—	May 29, 2019	Haleakala	Pan-STARRS 2	·	1.6 km	MPC · JPL
846330	2019 KN_{49}	—	May 29, 2019	Haleakala	Pan-STARRS 1	EOS	1.4 km	MPC · JPL
846331	2019 KX_{49}	—	May 29, 2019	Haleakala	Pan-STARRS 1	·	2.3 km	MPC · JPL
846332	2019 KD_{50}	—	May 27, 2019	Haleakala	Pan-STARRS 1	EOS	1.2 km	MPC · JPL
846333	2019 KH_{52}	—	February 15, 2013	Haleakala	Pan-STARRS 1	·	1.3 km	MPC · JPL
846334	2019 KN_{53}	—	May 27, 2019	Haleakala	Pan-STARRS 1	·	1.8 km	MPC · JPL
846335	2019 KY_{60}	—	June 23, 2014	Mount Lemmon	Mount Lemmon Survey	·	1.3 km	MPC · JPL
846336	2019 LU_{7}	—	February 12, 2018	Haleakala	Pan-STARRS 1	EUP	2.2 km	MPC · JPL
846337	2019 LV_{11}	—	February 8, 2010	WISE	WISE	·	1.5 km	MPC · JPL
846338	2019 LD_{15}	—	June 11, 2019	Haleakala	Pan-STARRS 1	·	2.3 km	MPC · JPL
846339	2019 LH_{15}	—	June 3, 2019	Haleakala	Pan-STARRS 1	·	3.1 km	MPC · JPL
846340	2019 LN_{17}	—	June 1, 2019	Haleakala	Pan-STARRS 2	THM	1.6 km	MPC · JPL
846341	2019 LW_{17}	—	June 2, 2019	Haleakala	Pan-STARRS 1	·	1.7 km	MPC · JPL
846342	2019 LJ_{18}	—	June 10, 2019	Haleakala	Pan-STARRS 1	·	1.7 km	MPC · JPL
846343	2019 LU_{18}	—	June 1, 2019	Haleakala	Pan-STARRS 2	·	1.9 km	MPC · JPL
846344	2019 LT_{20}	—	June 1, 2019	Haleakala	Pan-STARRS 1	·	1.5 km	MPC · JPL
846345	2019 LH_{21}	—	November 21, 2009	Kitt Peak	Spacewatch	·	1.7 km	MPC · JPL
846346	2019 LN_{40}	—	September 30, 2010	Mount Lemmon	Mount Lemmon Survey	EOS	1.3 km	MPC · JPL
846347	2019 LY_{41}	—	June 15, 2019	Haleakala	Pan-STARRS 1	·	2.5 km	MPC · JPL
846348	2019 LW_{42}	—	June 1, 2019	Haleakala	Pan-STARRS 1	·	2.1 km	MPC · JPL
846349	2019 MQ	—	May 29, 2019	Haleakala	Pan-STARRS 2	·	920 m	MPC · JPL
846350	2019 MB_{2}	—	April 10, 2016	Haleakala	Pan-STARRS 1	·	480 m	MPC · JPL
846351	2019 MH_{4}	—	June 4, 2019	Palomar Mountain	Zwicky Transient Facility	T_{j} (2.99)	2.1 km	MPC · JPL
846352	2019 MA_{8}	—	September 21, 2012	Mount Lemmon	Mount Lemmon Survey	·	830 m	MPC · JPL
846353	2019 MH_{11}	—	January 27, 2017	Haleakala	Pan-STARRS 1	·	1.6 km	MPC · JPL
846354	2019 ML_{12}	—	June 30, 2019	Haleakala	Pan-STARRS 1	·	2.1 km	MPC · JPL
846355	2019 MG_{15}	—	June 22, 2019	Haleakala	Pan-STARRS 1	·	1.4 km	MPC · JPL
846356	2019 MR_{15}	—	June 22, 2019	Haleakala	Pan-STARRS 1	·	1.4 km	MPC · JPL
846357	2019 MP_{27}	—	April 18, 2015	Cerro Tololo	DECam	L4	5.7 km	MPC · JPL
846358	2019 MH_{29}	—	June 30, 2019	Haleakala	Pan-STARRS 1	·	2.2 km	MPC · JPL
846359	2019 MW_{31}	—	June 29, 2019	Haleakala	Pan-STARRS 1	·	500 m	MPC · JPL
846360	2019 MV_{38}	—	June 30, 2019	Haleakala	Pan-STARRS 1	·	2.2 km	MPC · JPL
846361	2019 ND_{3}	—	March 28, 2015	Haleakala	Pan-STARRS 1	·	1.2 km	MPC · JPL
846362	2019 NO_{6}	—	January 11, 2008	Catalina	CSS	·	1.8 km	MPC · JPL
846363	2019 ND_{9}	—	July 1, 2019	Haleakala	Pan-STARRS 1	L4	5.9 km	MPC · JPL
846364	2019 NG_{11}	—	July 1, 2019	Haleakala	Pan-STARRS 1	L4	5.9 km	MPC · JPL
846365	2019 NU_{16}	—	January 8, 2010	Kitt Peak	Spacewatch	·	2.4 km	MPC · JPL
846366	2019 NJ_{18}	—	September 22, 2008	Kitt Peak	Spacewatch	NYS	1.0 km	MPC · JPL
846367	2019 NJ_{22}	—	October 19, 2015	Haleakala	Pan-STARRS 1	·	950 m	MPC · JPL
846368	2019 NL_{24}	—	July 3, 2019	Palomar Mountain	Zwicky Transient Facility	·	890 m	MPC · JPL
846369	2019 NW_{25}	—	November 18, 2016	Mount Lemmon	Mount Lemmon Survey	·	530 m	MPC · JPL
846370	2019 NF_{26}	—	July 14, 2019	Haleakala	Pan-STARRS 1	T_{j} (2.89)	2.9 km	MPC · JPL
846371	2019 NZ_{28}	—	July 9, 1997	Prescott	P. G. Comba	·	3.2 km	MPC · JPL
846372	2019 NC_{34}	—	February 5, 2011	Haleakala	Pan-STARRS 1	·	2.1 km	MPC · JPL
846373	2019 NM_{35}	—	July 4, 2019	Haleakala	Pan-STARRS 1	LUT	2.5 km	MPC · JPL
846374	2019 NN_{36}	—	July 6, 2019	Haleakala	Pan-STARRS 1	APO	390 m	MPC · JPL
846375	2019 NT_{38}	—	July 2, 2019	Haleakala	Pan-STARRS 1	·	1.9 km	MPC · JPL
846376	2019 NW_{38}	—	July 1, 2019	Haleakala	Pan-STARRS 1	·	930 m	MPC · JPL
846377	2019 NX_{38}	—	July 4, 2019	Mount Lemmon	Mount Lemmon Survey	·	2.6 km	MPC · JPL
846378	2019 NC_{39}	—	September 19, 1998	Sacramento Peak	SDSS	·	1.7 km	MPC · JPL
846379	2019 NS_{39}	—	July 10, 2019	Haleakala	Pan-STARRS 1	·	1.4 km	MPC · JPL
846380	2019 NY_{39}	—	July 1, 2019	Haleakala	Pan-STARRS 1	HYG	1.9 km	MPC · JPL
846381	2019 NL_{40}	—	July 1, 2019	Haleakala	Pan-STARRS 1	(5)	1.0 km	MPC · JPL
846382	2019 NB_{41}	—	July 2, 2019	Haleakala	Pan-STARRS 1	·	1.3 km	MPC · JPL
846383	2019 NG_{41}	—	July 1, 2019	Haleakala	Pan-STARRS 1	·	2.2 km	MPC · JPL
846384	2019 NU_{41}	—	July 7, 2019	Haleakala	Pan-STARRS 1	PHO	700 m	MPC · JPL
846385	2019 NB_{42}	—	July 1, 2019	Haleakala	Pan-STARRS 1	·	460 m	MPC · JPL
846386	2019 NV_{42}	—	July 3, 2019	Mount Lemmon	Mount Lemmon Survey	·	2.3 km	MPC · JPL
846387	2019 NK_{43}	—	July 1, 2019	Haleakala	Pan-STARRS 1	L4	5.9 km	MPC · JPL
846388	2019 NM_{48}	—	July 4, 2019	Haleakala	Pan-STARRS 1	·	2.1 km	MPC · JPL
846389	2019 NQ_{52}	—	July 4, 2019	Haleakala	Pan-STARRS 1	MAR	720 m	MPC · JPL
846390	2019 NM_{53}	—	July 4, 2019	Haleakala	Pan-STARRS 1	·	1.5 km	MPC · JPL
846391	2019 NO_{53}	—	July 4, 2019	Haleakala	Pan-STARRS 2	·	2.2 km	MPC · JPL
846392	2019 NX_{57}	—	July 1, 2019	Haleakala	Pan-STARRS 1	·	840 m	MPC · JPL
846393	2019 NY_{58}	—	July 1, 2019	Haleakala	Pan-STARRS 1	L4	6.7 km	MPC · JPL
846394	2019 NU_{61}	—	July 3, 2019	Haleakala	Pan-STARRS 2	·	950 m	MPC · JPL
846395	2019 NF_{62}	—	July 2, 2019	Haleakala	Pan-STARRS 1	·	2.2 km	MPC · JPL
846396	2019 NH_{62}	—	June 29, 2019	Haleakala	Pan-STARRS 1	·	1.8 km	MPC · JPL
846397	2019 NQ_{71}	—	October 5, 2013	Haleakala	Pan-STARRS 1	·	3.2 km	MPC · JPL
846398	2019 NV_{71}	—	July 1, 2019	Haleakala	Pan-STARRS 1	L4	6.0 km	MPC · JPL
846399	2019 NY_{71}	—	July 1, 2019	Haleakala	Pan-STARRS 1	AGN	890 m	MPC · JPL
846400	2019 NT_{72}	—	July 1, 2019	Haleakala	Pan-STARRS 1	HOF	1.7 km	MPC · JPL

== 846401–846500 ==
back to top

Designation			Discovery			Properties		Ref
Permanent	Provisional	Named after	Date	Site	Discoverer(s)	Category	Diam.	Ref
846401	2019 NQ_{81}	—	July 3, 2019	Haleakala	Pan-STARRS 1	·	2.8 km	MPC · JPL
846402	2019 NG_{83}	—	July 4, 2019	Haleakala	Pan-STARRS 1	·	760 m	MPC · JPL
846403	2019 NR_{85}	—	July 4, 2019	Haleakala	Pan-STARRS 1	·	500 m	MPC · JPL
846404	2019 NC_{88}	—	February 3, 2013	Haleakala	Pan-STARRS 1	·	1.1 km	MPC · JPL
846405	2019 NP_{92}	—	July 10, 2019	Haleakala	Pan-STARRS 1	·	1.2 km	MPC · JPL
846406	2019 NC_{103}	—	April 19, 2007	Mount Lemmon	Mount Lemmon Survey	·	1 km	MPC · JPL
846407	2019 NV_{111}	—	July 6, 2019	Haleakala	Pan-STARRS 1	·	2.1 km	MPC · JPL
846408	2019 OO_{3}	—	November 17, 2007	Mount Lemmon	Mount Lemmon Survey	H	420 m	MPC · JPL
846409	2019 OC_{7}	—	July 30, 2019	Haleakala	Pan-STARRS 1	L4	5.8 km	MPC · JPL
846410	2019 OA_{16}	—	February 11, 2016	Haleakala	Pan-STARRS 1	T_{j} (2.98)	2.8 km	MPC · JPL
846411	2019 OS_{20}	—	November 7, 2016	Mount Lemmon	Mount Lemmon Survey	·	520 m	MPC · JPL
846412	2019 OG_{23}	—	May 30, 2014	Kitt Peak	Research and Education Collaborative Occultation Network	·	870 m	MPC · JPL
846413	2019 OF_{24}	—	July 28, 2019	Haleakala	Pan-STARRS 2	GEF	800 m	MPC · JPL
846414	2019 OL_{24}	—	July 28, 2019	Haleakala	Pan-STARRS 2	·	2.7 km	MPC · JPL
846415	2019 OY_{24}	—	July 29, 2019	Haleakala	Pan-STARRS 2	·	1.7 km	MPC · JPL
846416	2019 OL_{25}	—	August 21, 2006	Kitt Peak	Spacewatch	·	1.0 km	MPC · JPL
846417	2019 OO_{25}	—	September 23, 2008	Kitt Peak	Spacewatch	LUT	3.2 km	MPC · JPL
846418	2019 OF_{28}	—	July 24, 2019	Palomar Mountain	Zwicky Transient Facility	·	2.4 km	MPC · JPL
846419	2019 OG_{29}	—	July 25, 2019	Haleakala	Pan-STARRS 1	·	760 m	MPC · JPL
846420	2019 OD_{47}	—	July 26, 2019	Haleakala	Pan-STARRS 1	·	2.0 km	MPC · JPL
846421	2019 PD_{5}	—	February 8, 2011	Mount Lemmon	Mount Lemmon Survey	(1118)	2.2 km	MPC · JPL
846422	2019 PK_{5}	—	December 3, 2015	Haleakala	Pan-STARRS 1	·	1.4 km	MPC · JPL
846423	2019 PM_{17}	—	August 4, 2019	Haleakala	Pan-STARRS 1	·	1.4 km	MPC · JPL
846424	2019 PO_{31}	—	August 7, 2019	Haleakala	Pan-STARRS 2	ADE	1.3 km	MPC · JPL
846425	2019 PL_{34}	—	August 9, 2019	Haleakala	Pan-STARRS 1	·	910 m	MPC · JPL
846426	2019 PY_{35}	—	August 5, 2019	Haleakala	Pan-STARRS 1	·	730 m	MPC · JPL
846427	2019 PV_{37}	—	August 4, 2019	Haleakala	Pan-STARRS 1	L4	5.9 km	MPC · JPL
846428	2019 PZ_{38}	—	August 8, 2019	Haleakala	Pan-STARRS 1	·	2.3 km	MPC · JPL
846429	2019 PA_{47}	—	August 4, 2019	Haleakala	Pan-STARRS 1	·	3.2 km	MPC · JPL
846430	2019 PO_{50}	—	August 9, 2019	Haleakala	Pan-STARRS 1	·	1.6 km	MPC · JPL
846431	2019 PP_{53}	—	August 8, 2019	Haleakala	Pan-STARRS 1	EOS	1.3 km	MPC · JPL
846432	2019 PE_{59}	—	August 9, 2019	Haleakala	Pan-STARRS 1	L4	6.1 km	MPC · JPL
846433	2019 PG_{61}	—	August 5, 2019	Haleakala	Pan-STARRS 1	·	1.2 km	MPC · JPL
846434	2019 PK_{73}	—	August 5, 2019	Haleakala	Pan-STARRS 1	·	900 m	MPC · JPL
846435	2019 QU_{5}	—	November 17, 1998	Kitt Peak	Spacewatch	L4	8.9 km	MPC · JPL
846436	2019 QD_{9}	—	September 6, 2008	Mount Lemmon	Mount Lemmon Survey	MAS	450 m	MPC · JPL
846437	2019 QH_{9}	—	August 25, 2014	Haleakala	Pan-STARRS 1	·	1.7 km	MPC · JPL
846438	2019 QW_{9}	—	May 21, 2014	Haleakala	Pan-STARRS 1	·	940 m	MPC · JPL
846439	2019 QR_{12}	—	December 14, 2015	Mount Lemmon	Mount Lemmon Survey	·	940 m	MPC · JPL
846440	2019 QZ_{16}	—	August 26, 2019	Haleakala	Pan-STARRS 2	·	2.9 km	MPC · JPL
846441	2019 QL_{17}	—	August 24, 2019	Haleakala	Pan-STARRS 1	·	2.5 km	MPC · JPL
846442	2019 QX_{17}	—	May 18, 2010	WISE	WISE	·	1.7 km	MPC · JPL
846443	2019 QF_{25}	—	August 27, 2019	Mount Lemmon	Mount Lemmon Survey	·	910 m	MPC · JPL
846444	2019 QS_{25}	—	August 8, 2019	Haleakala	Pan-STARRS 1	·	850 m	MPC · JPL
846445	2019 QC_{28}	—	August 21, 2019	Haleakala	Pan-STARRS 1	·	2.6 km	MPC · JPL
846446	2019 QM_{33}	—	August 21, 2019	Mount Lemmon	Mount Lemmon Survey	·	820 m	MPC · JPL
846447	2019 QA_{37}	—	September 23, 2015	Haleakala	Pan-STARRS 1	·	1.1 km	MPC · JPL
846448	2019 QK_{37}	—	December 12, 2015	Haleakala	Pan-STARRS 1	·	1.2 km	MPC · JPL
846449	2019 QP_{40}	—	August 29, 2006	Kitt Peak	Spacewatch	·	2.4 km	MPC · JPL
846450	2019 QE_{41}	—	August 27, 2019	Mount Lemmon	Mount Lemmon Survey	·	1.5 km	MPC · JPL
846451	2019 QA_{44}	—	August 29, 2019	Haleakala	Pan-STARRS 1	3:2	3.3 km	MPC · JPL
846452	2019 QH_{52}	—	August 31, 2019	Haleakala	Pan-STARRS 1	·	1.2 km	MPC · JPL
846453	2019 QM_{64}	—	August 28, 2019	Haleakala	Pan-STARRS 1	·	760 m	MPC · JPL
846454	2019 QV_{67}	—	August 31, 2019	Haleakala	Pan-STARRS 1	·	430 m	MPC · JPL
846455	2019 QW_{67}	—	August 26, 2019	Haleakala	Pan-STARRS 2	·	2.2 km	MPC · JPL
846456	2019 QW_{69}	—	April 23, 2014	Cerro Tololo	DECam	·	660 m	MPC · JPL
846457	2019 QT_{72}	—	August 26, 2019	Haleakala	Pan-STARRS 2	SYL	2.8 km	MPC · JPL
846458	2019 QQ_{79}	—	April 21, 2009	Mount Lemmon	Mount Lemmon Survey	AEO	940 m	MPC · JPL
846459	2019 QR_{89}	—	June 7, 2018	Kitt Peak	Spacewatch	·	870 m	MPC · JPL
846460	2019 QU_{124}	—	March 17, 2018	Haleakala	Pan-STARRS 1	·	700 m	MPC · JPL
846461	2019 RN_{2}	—	January 18, 2004	Palomar	NEAT	·	1.4 km	MPC · JPL
846462	2019 RY_{8}	—	September 4, 2019	Haleakala	Pan-STARRS 1	HOF	1.7 km	MPC · JPL
846463	2019 RH_{9}	—	September 5, 2019	Mount Lemmon	Mount Lemmon Survey	·	910 m	MPC · JPL
846464 Vaižgantas	2019 RS_{14}	Vaižgantas	October 5, 2015	Baldone	K. Černis, I. Eglītis	·	540 m	MPC · JPL
846465	2019 RE_{29}	—	September 4, 2019	Haleakala	Pan-STARRS 1	BRA	1.3 km	MPC · JPL
846466	2019 RR_{29}	—	September 4, 2019	Mount Lemmon	Mount Lemmon Survey	·	1.1 km	MPC · JPL
846467	2019 RC_{30}	—	September 7, 2019	Mount Lemmon	Mount Lemmon Survey	EOS	1.3 km	MPC · JPL
846468	2019 RD_{33}	—	September 5, 2019	Mount Lemmon	Mount Lemmon Survey	·	2.2 km	MPC · JPL
846469	2019 RW_{37}	—	September 4, 2019	Mount Lemmon	Mount Lemmon Survey	·	700 m	MPC · JPL
846470	2019 RP_{51}	—	April 23, 2014	Cerro Tololo	DECam	L4	4.8 km	MPC · JPL
846471	2019 RC_{84}	—	September 4, 2019	Mount Lemmon	Mount Lemmon Survey	·	2.8 km	MPC · JPL
846472	2019 RQ_{85}	—	September 4, 2019	Mount Lemmon	Mount Lemmon Survey	·	940 m	MPC · JPL
846473	2019 SR_{12}	—	June 10, 2010	WISE	WISE	·	1.3 km	MPC · JPL
846474	2019 SR_{14}	—	February 9, 2016	Haleakala	Pan-STARRS 1	·	2.7 km	MPC · JPL
846475	2019 SD_{15}	—	February 25, 2010	WISE	WISE	·	2.4 km	MPC · JPL
846476	2019 SE_{25}	—	September 24, 2019	Haleakala	Pan-STARRS 1	·	1.3 km	MPC · JPL
846477	2019 SY_{26}	—	May 29, 2010	WISE	WISE	·	3.3 km	MPC · JPL
846478	2019 SC_{27}	—	April 18, 2015	Cerro Tololo	DECam	·	430 m	MPC · JPL
846479	2019 SY_{38}	—	April 23, 2014	Cerro Tololo	DECam	·	650 m	MPC · JPL
846480	2019 SW_{41}	—	September 6, 2008	Catalina	CSS	·	1.9 km	MPC · JPL
846481	2019 SJ_{42}	—	September 30, 2019	Mount Lemmon	Mount Lemmon Survey	·	490 m	MPC · JPL
846482	2019 SO_{44}	—	September 27, 2019	Haleakala	Pan-STARRS 1	·	1.7 km	MPC · JPL
846483	2019 SF_{45}	—	October 30, 2002	Sacramento Peak	SDSS	LIX	2.7 km	MPC · JPL
846484	2019 SZ_{45}	—	April 2, 2009	Kitt Peak	Spacewatch	·	2.0 km	MPC · JPL
846485	2019 SE_{55}	—	November 2, 2006	Mount Lemmon	Mount Lemmon Survey	·	600 m	MPC · JPL
846486	2019 SD_{57}	—	September 16, 2009	Kitt Peak	Spacewatch	·	630 m	MPC · JPL
846487	2019 SF_{58}	—	September 29, 2003	Kitt Peak	Spacewatch	·	1.2 km	MPC · JPL
846488	2019 SM_{71}	—	December 22, 2008	Mount Lemmon	Mount Lemmon Survey	·	3.4 km	MPC · JPL
846489	2019 SC_{73}	—	April 28, 2014	Cerro Tololo	DECam	·	840 m	MPC · JPL
846490	2019 SP_{82}	—	September 27, 2019	Haleakala	Pan-STARRS 1	·	1.5 km	MPC · JPL
846491	2019 SM_{83}	—	September 20, 2019	Mount Lemmon	Mount Lemmon Survey	EUN	980 m	MPC · JPL
846492	2019 SZ_{83}	—	September 24, 2019	Haleakala	Pan-STARRS 1	·	1.1 km	MPC · JPL
846493	2019 SH_{84}	—	September 24, 2019	Haleakala	Pan-STARRS 1	·	1.8 km	MPC · JPL
846494	2019 SQ_{84}	—	September 25, 2019	Haleakala	Pan-STARRS 1	·	1.7 km	MPC · JPL
846495	2019 SH_{86}	—	September 28, 2019	Mount Lemmon	Mount Lemmon Survey	·	490 m	MPC · JPL
846496	2019 SP_{89}	—	September 27, 2019	Haleakala	Pan-STARRS 1	THM	1.8 km	MPC · JPL
846497	2019 SY_{108}	—	September 20, 2019	Mount Lemmon	Mount Lemmon Survey	·	1.1 km	MPC · JPL
846498	2019 SD_{121}	—	September 28, 2019	Mount Lemmon	Mount Lemmon Survey	JUN	910 m	MPC · JPL
846499	2019 SC_{122}	—	November 19, 2007	Kitt Peak	Spacewatch	·	1.3 km	MPC · JPL
846500	2019 SK_{144}	—	September 29, 2019	Mount Lemmon	Mount Lemmon Survey	·	1.6 km	MPC · JPL

== 846501–846600 ==
back to top

Designation			Discovery			Properties		Ref
Permanent	Provisional	Named after	Date	Site	Discoverer(s)	Category	Diam.	Ref
846501	2019 SB_{145}	—	September 24, 2019	Haleakala	Pan-STARRS 1	·	1.2 km	MPC · JPL
846502	2019 SQ_{149}	—	September 27, 2019	Haleakala	Pan-STARRS 1	·	1.4 km	MPC · JPL
846503	2019 SU_{185}	—	September 28, 2019	Mount Lemmon	Mount Lemmon Survey	·	470 m	MPC · JPL
846504	2019 SW_{186}	—	June 6, 2018	Haleakala	Pan-STARRS 1	·	1.2 km	MPC · JPL
846505	2019 SO_{188}	—	January 3, 2017	Haleakala	Pan-STARRS 1	·	1.4 km	MPC · JPL
846506	2019 SG_{198}	—	September 28, 2019	Mount Lemmon	Mount Lemmon Survey	EUN	950 m	MPC · JPL
846507	2019 TR_{3}	—	November 17, 2014	Haleakala	Pan-STARRS 1	H	420 m	MPC · JPL
846508	2019 TH_{4}	—	February 12, 2016	Haleakala	Pan-STARRS 1	·	440 m	MPC · JPL
846509	2019 TH_{6}	—	August 24, 2019	Haleakala	Pan-STARRS 1	AMO	610 m	MPC · JPL
846510	2019 TJ_{11}	—	October 5, 2019	Haleakala	Pan-STARRS 2	·	630 m	MPC · JPL
846511	2019 TV_{13}	—	March 28, 2016	Cerro Tololo	DECam	TIR	2.2 km	MPC · JPL
846512	2019 TE_{21}	—	October 8, 2019	Haleakala	Pan-STARRS 1	·	650 m	MPC · JPL
846513	2019 TJ_{22}	—	October 31, 2008	Kitt Peak	Spacewatch	·	2.1 km	MPC · JPL
846514	2019 TT_{29}	—	October 2, 2019	Mount Lemmon	Mount Lemmon Survey	·	2.0 km	MPC · JPL
846515	2019 TB_{35}	—	October 19, 2003	Sacramento Peak	SDSS	H	310 m	MPC · JPL
846516	2019 TH_{35}	—	October 5, 2019	Haleakala	Pan-STARRS 1	·	420 m	MPC · JPL
846517	2019 TS_{35}	—	October 6, 2019	Haleakala	Pan-STARRS 1	H	340 m	MPC · JPL
846518	2019 TV_{35}	—	October 8, 2019	Mount Lemmon	Mount Lemmon Survey	·	1.0 km	MPC · JPL
846519	2019 TF_{36}	—	October 8, 2019	Mount Lemmon	Mount Lemmon Survey	·	1.1 km	MPC · JPL
846520	2019 TN_{36}	—	October 9, 2019	Mount Lemmon	Mount Lemmon Survey	VER	1.9 km	MPC · JPL
846521	2019 TS_{43}	—	May 12, 2015	Mount Lemmon	Mount Lemmon Survey	·	480 m	MPC · JPL
846522	2019 TP_{48}	—	May 20, 2015	Cerro Tololo	DECam	·	610 m	MPC · JPL
846523	2019 TY_{54}	—	July 14, 2015	Haleakala	Pan-STARRS 1	·	1.0 km	MPC · JPL
846524	2019 TQ_{60}	—	April 28, 2014	Cerro Tololo	DECam	(5)	670 m	MPC · JPL
846525	2019 TS_{63}	—	October 8, 2019	Mount Lemmon	Mount Lemmon Survey	·	1.3 km	MPC · JPL
846526	2019 TT_{64}	—	October 8, 2019	Haleakala	Pan-STARRS 1	·	880 m	MPC · JPL
846527	2019 TC_{67}	—	May 21, 2015	Cerro Tololo	DECam	·	570 m	MPC · JPL
846528	2019 TW_{74}	—	October 8, 2019	Haleakala	Pan-STARRS 1	H	380 m	MPC · JPL
846529	2019 UR_{3}	—	July 5, 2005	Mount Lemmon	Mount Lemmon Survey	H	440 m	MPC · JPL
846530	2019 UK_{10}	—	March 21, 2010	WISE	WISE	·	800 m	MPC · JPL
846531	2019 UR_{15}	—	April 30, 2010	WISE	WISE	RAF	820 m	MPC · JPL
846532	2019 UT_{15}	—	October 29, 2011	Kitt Peak	Spacewatch	H	420 m	MPC · JPL
846533	2019 UJ_{23}	—	September 3, 2013	Mount Lemmon	Mount Lemmon Survey	·	2.3 km	MPC · JPL
846534	2019 UB_{24}	—	October 24, 2019	Mount Lemmon	Mount Lemmon Survey	·	1.5 km	MPC · JPL
846535	2019 UK_{24}	—	October 3, 2014	Mount Lemmon	Mount Lemmon Survey	·	1.6 km	MPC · JPL
846536	2019 UT_{24}	—	April 18, 2015	Cerro Tololo	DECam	·	580 m	MPC · JPL
846537	2019 UT_{28}	—	September 26, 2000	Sacramento Peak	SDSS	·	760 m	MPC · JPL
846538	2019 UN_{34}	—	October 23, 2019	Mount Lemmon	Mount Lemmon Survey	·	650 m	MPC · JPL
846539	2019 UY_{35}	—	October 24, 2019	Haleakala	Pan-STARRS 1	·	920 m	MPC · JPL
846540	2019 UU_{36}	—	October 17, 2010	Mount Lemmon	Mount Lemmon Survey	·	1.1 km	MPC · JPL
846541	2019 UC_{37}	—	October 24, 2019	Mount Lemmon	Mount Lemmon Survey	EOS	1.2 km	MPC · JPL
846542	2019 UJ_{38}	—	October 22, 2019	Mount Lemmon	Mount Lemmon Survey	EOS	1.3 km	MPC · JPL
846543	2019 UO_{40}	—	October 7, 2008	Mount Lemmon	Mount Lemmon Survey	·	2.0 km	MPC · JPL
846544	2019 UM_{63}	—	October 23, 2019	Haleakala	Pan-STARRS 1	·	740 m	MPC · JPL
846545	2019 US_{64}	—	January 27, 2017	Haleakala	Pan-STARRS 1	NYS	820 m	MPC · JPL
846546	2019 UB_{66}	—	October 8, 2008	Kitt Peak	Spacewatch	·	1.7 km	MPC · JPL
846547	2019 UZ_{95}	—	April 15, 2012	Haleakala	Pan-STARRS 1	·	460 m	MPC · JPL
846548	2019 UQ_{100}	—	February 10, 2014	Haleakala	Pan-STARRS 1	·	880 m	MPC · JPL
846549	2019 UX_{103}	—	October 24, 2019	Haleakala	Pan-STARRS 1	·	2.7 km	MPC · JPL
846550	2019 US_{104}	—	October 23, 2019	Haleakala	Pan-STARRS 1	·	1.7 km	MPC · JPL
846551	2019 UA_{105}	—	February 16, 2004	Kitt Peak	Spacewatch	·	500 m	MPC · JPL
846552	2019 UF_{128}	—	October 26, 2019	Haleakala	Pan-STARRS 1	BRA	1.1 km	MPC · JPL
846553	2019 UO_{143}	—	October 27, 2019	Haleakala	Pan-STARRS 1	·	1.6 km	MPC · JPL
846554	2019 UB_{201}	—	October 23, 2019	Haleakala	Pan-STARRS 1	·	1.3 km	MPC · JPL
846555	2019 VL_{1}	—	November 18, 2011	Mount Lemmon	Mount Lemmon Survey	H	570 m	MPC · JPL
846556	2019 VR_{7}	—	September 26, 2008	Mount Lemmon	Mount Lemmon Survey	·	1.7 km	MPC · JPL
846557	2019 VN_{8}	—	November 5, 2019	Haleakala	Pan-STARRS 2	·	820 m	MPC · JPL
846558	2019 VY_{8}	—	April 23, 2014	Cerro Tololo	DECam	V	420 m	MPC · JPL
846559	2019 VZ_{8}	—	November 7, 2019	Haleakala	Pan-STARRS 1	·	1.7 km	MPC · JPL
846560	2019 VM_{9}	—	November 8, 2019	Mount Lemmon	Mount Lemmon Survey	·	940 m	MPC · JPL
846561	2019 VY_{18}	—	November 2, 2019	Haleakala	Pan-STARRS 1	·	1.0 km	MPC · JPL
846562	2019 VJ_{23}	—	November 4, 2019	Mount Lemmon	Mount Lemmon Survey	·	970 m	MPC · JPL
846563	2019 VL_{33}	—	November 2, 2019	Haleakala	Pan-STARRS 1	BAR	1.1 km	MPC · JPL
846564	2019 WJ_{3}	—	December 25, 2003	Kitt Peak	Spacewatch	PHO	840 m	MPC · JPL
846565	2019 WH_{7}	—	November 27, 2019	Haleakala	Pan-STARRS 1	·	360 m	MPC · JPL
846566	2019 WG_{12}	—	November 24, 2019	Mount Lemmon	Mount Lemmon Survey	·	430 m	MPC · JPL
846567	2019 WN_{15}	—	February 27, 2009	Mauna Kea	P. A. Wiegert	·	940 m	MPC · JPL
846568	2019 WK_{16}	—	November 29, 2019	Haleakala	Pan-STARRS 1	·	2.0 km	MPC · JPL
846569	2019 WU_{20}	—	November 19, 2019	Mount Lemmon	Mount Lemmon Survey	·	1.4 km	MPC · JPL
846570	2019 WV_{20}	—	November 18, 2019	Mount Lemmon	Mount Lemmon Survey	H	340 m	MPC · JPL
846571	2019 XK_{12}	—	December 3, 2019	Haleakala	Pan-STARRS 1	·	1.9 km	MPC · JPL
846572	2019 XO_{14}	—	December 2, 2019	Mount Lemmon	Mount Lemmon Survey	·	580 m	MPC · JPL
846573	2019 YR_{20}	—	April 24, 2014	Cerro Tololo	DECam	·	440 m	MPC · JPL
846574	2019 YN_{21}	—	May 1, 2016	Cerro Tololo	DECam	EOS	1.2 km	MPC · JPL
846575	2019 YL_{23}	—	December 30, 2019	Haleakala	Pan-STARRS 1	·	2.2 km	MPC · JPL
846576	2019 YX_{32}	—	December 17, 2019	Mount Lemmon	Mount Lemmon Survey	TIR	2.2 km	MPC · JPL
846577	2019 YF_{49}	—	November 17, 2014	Haleakala	Pan-STARRS 1	MRX	660 m	MPC · JPL
846578	2020 AB_{4}	—	March 26, 2007	Catalina	CSS	(1547)	1.3 km	MPC · JPL
846579	2020 AF_{4}	—	May 1, 2016	Cerro Tololo	DECam	·	1.5 km	MPC · JPL
846580	2020 AM_{4}	—	January 4, 2020	Mount Lemmon	Mount Lemmon Survey	·	2.3 km	MPC · JPL
846581	2020 AV_{8}	—	January 2, 2020	Haleakala	Pan-STARRS 1	·	980 m	MPC · JPL
846582	2020 BH_{4}	—	November 5, 2016	Mount Lemmon	Mount Lemmon Survey	H	340 m	MPC · JPL
846583	2020 BH_{12}	—	January 27, 2020	Haleakala	Pan-STARRS 1	·	1.3 km	MPC · JPL
846584	2020 BQ_{13}	—	January 25, 2020	Mount Lemmon	Mount Lemmon Survey	AMO	380 m	MPC · JPL
846585	2020 BO_{17}	—	January 23, 2020	Haleakala	Pan-STARRS 1	·	470 m	MPC · JPL
846586	2020 BH_{18}	—	July 26, 2017	Haleakala	Pan-STARRS 1	·	2.5 km	MPC · JPL
846587	2020 BU_{20}	—	January 21, 2020	Haleakala	Pan-STARRS 1	H	350 m	MPC · JPL
846588	2020 BB_{21}	—	January 22, 2020	Haleakala	Pan-STARRS 2	·	700 m	MPC · JPL
846589	2020 BJ_{21}	—	January 18, 2020	Haleakala	Pan-STARRS 1	·	2.0 km	MPC · JPL
846590	2020 BH_{24}	—	November 9, 2007	Mount Lemmon	Mount Lemmon Survey	·	1.9 km	MPC · JPL
846591	2020 BU_{27}	—	September 14, 2018	Mount Lemmon	Mount Lemmon Survey	·	1.9 km	MPC · JPL
846592	2020 BK_{29}	—	March 29, 2004	Kitt Peak	Spacewatch	·	1.9 km	MPC · JPL
846593	2020 BT_{32}	—	March 22, 2009	Catalina	CSS	·	970 m	MPC · JPL
846594	2020 BT_{34}	—	January 28, 2020	Mount Lemmon	Mount Lemmon Survey	·	1.1 km	MPC · JPL
846595	2020 BO_{36}	—	October 4, 2013	Mount Lemmon	Mount Lemmon Survey	·	1.1 km	MPC · JPL
846596	2020 BO_{37}	—	February 13, 2011	Mount Lemmon	Mount Lemmon Survey	critical	1.1 km	MPC · JPL
846597	2020 BX_{37}	—	August 8, 2016	Haleakala	Pan-STARRS 1	H	310 m	MPC · JPL
846598	2020 BM_{38}	—	January 22, 2015	Haleakala	Pan-STARRS 1	·	2.2 km	MPC · JPL
846599	2020 BG_{41}	—	September 20, 2011	Haleakala	Pan-STARRS 1	·	2.5 km	MPC · JPL
846600	2020 BV_{47}	—	January 20, 2020	Haleakala	Pan-STARRS 1	·	870 m	MPC · JPL

== 846601–846700 ==
back to top

Designation			Discovery			Properties		Ref
Permanent	Provisional	Named after	Date	Site	Discoverer(s)	Category	Diam.	Ref
846601	2020 BS_{61}	—	January 19, 2020	Mount Lemmon	Mount Lemmon Survey	H	340 m	MPC · JPL
846602	2020 BS_{70}	—	March 29, 2016	Cerro Tololo-DECam	DECam	·	1.3 km	MPC · JPL
846603	2020 BG_{75}	—	January 23, 2020	Haleakala	Pan-STARRS 2	·	1.8 km	MPC · JPL
846604	2020 BK_{76}	—	April 15, 2010	WISE	WISE	·	3.6 km	MPC · JPL
846605	2020 BO_{78}	—	April 2, 2016	Haleakala	Pan-STARRS 1	·	1.1 km	MPC · JPL
846606	2020 BX_{78}	—	January 23, 2020	Mount Lemmon	Mount Lemmon Survey	PHO	580 m	MPC · JPL
846607	2020 BE_{79}	—	January 22, 2020	Haleakala	Pan-STARRS 1	·	1.3 km	MPC · JPL
846608	2020 BC_{89}	—	January 21, 2020	Haleakala	Pan-STARRS 1	·	1.8 km	MPC · JPL
846609	2020 BZ_{89}	—	January 23, 2020	Mount Lemmon	Mount Lemmon Survey	H	340 m	MPC · JPL
846610	2020 BM_{90}	—	January 18, 2020	Haleakala	Pan-STARRS 1	H	320 m	MPC · JPL
846611	2020 BD_{98}	—	January 25, 2020	Mount Lemmon	Mount Lemmon Survey	·	2.0 km	MPC · JPL
846612	2020 BZ_{99}	—	January 21, 2020	Haleakala	Pan-STARRS 1	·	970 m	MPC · JPL
846613	2020 BG_{120}	—	January 18, 2020	Mount Lemmon	Mount Lemmon Survey	PHO	580 m	MPC · JPL
846614	2020 BS_{129}	—	January 23, 2020	Mount Lemmon	Mount Lemmon Survey	H	370 m	MPC · JPL
846615	2020 BE_{151}	—	January 24, 2020	Mount Lemmon	Mount Lemmon Survey	HNS	850 m	MPC · JPL
846616	2020 DB_{12}	—	April 19, 2015	Mount Lemmon	Mount Lemmon Survey	·	1.9 km	MPC · JPL
846617	2020 DB_{14}	—	February 27, 2020	Cerro Tololo	DECam	·	550 m	MPC · JPL
846618	2020 DV_{14}	—	February 17, 2020	Mount Lemmon	Mount Lemmon Survey	EUN	740 m	MPC · JPL
846619	2020 EN_{1}	—	February 26, 2014	Haleakala	Pan-STARRS 1	critical	2.0 km	MPC · JPL
846620	2020 FZ_{8}	—	March 21, 2020	Haleakala	Pan-STARRS 1	·	770 m	MPC · JPL
846621	2020 FC_{9}	—	March 24, 2020	Mount Lemmon	Mount Lemmon Survey	HNS	720 m	MPC · JPL
846622	2020 FS_{9}	—	March 24, 2020	Mount Lemmon	Mount Lemmon Survey	H	470 m	MPC · JPL
846623	2020 FU_{9}	—	March 21, 2020	Haleakala	Pan-STARRS 1	THB	2.1 km	MPC · JPL
846624	2020 FW_{9}	—	March 19, 2020	Haleakala	Pan-STARRS 1	EUN	890 m	MPC · JPL
846625	2020 FK_{10}	—	May 2, 2016	Haleakala	Pan-STARRS 1	·	900 m	MPC · JPL
846626	2020 FS_{10}	—	March 21, 2020	Haleakala	Pan-STARRS 1	H	320 m	MPC · JPL
846627	2020 FT_{10}	—	March 21, 2020	Haleakala	Pan-STARRS 1	L5	6.9 km	MPC · JPL
846628	2020 FY_{10}	—	March 24, 2020	Mount Lemmon	Mount Lemmon Survey	H	300 m	MPC · JPL
846629	2020 FG_{11}	—	March 21, 2020	Haleakala	Pan-STARRS 2	·	1.4 km	MPC · JPL
846630	2020 FD_{12}	—	March 21, 2020	Haleakala	Pan-STARRS 1	·	1.1 km	MPC · JPL
846631	2020 FT_{14}	—	September 26, 2000	Sacramento Peak	SDSS	·	1.5 km	MPC · JPL
846632	2020 FC_{19}	—	March 21, 2020	Haleakala	Pan-STARRS 1	·	1.1 km	MPC · JPL
846633	2020 FT_{19}	—	March 21, 2020	Haleakala	Pan-STARRS 1	·	2.5 km	MPC · JPL
846634	2020 FC_{22}	—	March 21, 2020	Haleakala	Pan-STARRS 2	(1547)	1.1 km	MPC · JPL
846635	2020 FU_{25}	—	February 7, 2011	Mount Lemmon	Mount Lemmon Survey	·	850 m	MPC · JPL
846636	2020 FE_{35}	—	March 16, 2020	Mount Lemmon	Mount Lemmon Survey	(1547)	1.1 km	MPC · JPL
846637	2020 FW_{35}	—	March 29, 2020	Haleakala	Pan-STARRS 1	·	1.1 km	MPC · JPL
846638	2020 FC_{36}	—	March 4, 2016	Haleakala	Pan-STARRS 1	·	780 m	MPC · JPL
846639	2020 GH_{5}	—	September 15, 2017	Haleakala	Pan-STARRS 1	·	1.2 km	MPC · JPL
846640	2020 GB_{6}	—	June 21, 2012	Mount Lemmon	Mount Lemmon Survey	·	1.0 km	MPC · JPL
846641	2020 GC_{6}	—	April 3, 2020	Mount Lemmon	Mount Lemmon Survey	·	500 m	MPC · JPL
846642	2020 GG_{7}	—	April 15, 2020	Mount Lemmon	Mount Lemmon Survey	·	890 m	MPC · JPL
846643	2020 GM_{8}	—	March 10, 2011	Kitt Peak	Spacewatch	·	1.1 km	MPC · JPL
846644	2020 GC_{10}	—	April 14, 2015	XuYi	PMO NEO Survey Program	H	390 m	MPC · JPL
846645	2020 GY_{11}	—	April 3, 2020	Mount Lemmon	Mount Lemmon Survey	·	1.0 km	MPC · JPL
846646	2020 GB_{12}	—	April 3, 2020	Mount Lemmon	Mount Lemmon Survey	ADE	1.4 km	MPC · JPL
846647	2020 GU_{13}	—	April 15, 2020	Mount Lemmon	Mount Lemmon Survey	·	1.1 km	MPC · JPL
846648	2020 GW_{16}	—	April 14, 2016	Haleakala	Pan-STARRS 1	EUN	730 m	MPC · JPL
846649	2020 GZ_{22}	—	March 6, 2011	Mount Lemmon	Mount Lemmon Survey	·	1.1 km	MPC · JPL
846650	2020 GS_{23}	—	April 15, 2020	Haleakala	Pan-STARRS 1	·	700 m	MPC · JPL
846651	2020 GP_{24}	—	April 2, 2020	Mount Lemmon	Mount Lemmon Survey	·	1.2 km	MPC · JPL
846652	2020 GJ_{26}	—	March 14, 2011	Mount Lemmon	Mount Lemmon Survey	·	1.4 km	MPC · JPL
846653	2020 GQ_{26}	—	May 7, 2016	Haleakala	Pan-STARRS 1	·	940 m	MPC · JPL
846654	2020 GM_{27}	—	September 23, 2017	Haleakala	Pan-STARRS 1	·	830 m	MPC · JPL
846655	2020 HW_{9}	—	June 24, 2014	Haleakala	Pan-STARRS 1	APO	530 m	MPC · JPL
846656	2020 HC_{12}	—	February 16, 2015	Haleakala	Pan-STARRS 1	·	1.4 km	MPC · JPL
846657	2020 HO_{14}	—	April 16, 2020	Mount Lemmon	Mount Lemmon Survey	·	1.1 km	MPC · JPL
846658	2020 HF_{18}	—	April 23, 2011	Haleakala	Pan-STARRS 1	·	940 m	MPC · JPL
846659	2020 HS_{20}	—	February 26, 2011	Mount Lemmon	Mount Lemmon Survey	·	970 m	MPC · JPL
846660	2020 HA_{22}	—	June 29, 2014	Mount Lemmon	Mount Lemmon Survey	·	630 m	MPC · JPL
846661	2020 HB_{22}	—	April 22, 2020	Haleakala	Pan-STARRS 1	EUN	670 m	MPC · JPL
846662	2020 HE_{22}	—	June 7, 2016	Mount Lemmon	Mount Lemmon Survey	·	1.4 km	MPC · JPL
846663	2020 HW_{23}	—	January 18, 2015	Haleakala	Pan-STARRS 1	·	930 m	MPC · JPL
846664	2020 HA_{25}	—	July 4, 2016	Haleakala	Pan-STARRS 1	·	1.0 km	MPC · JPL
846665	2020 HU_{25}	—	August 7, 2016	Haleakala	Pan-STARRS 1	·	990 m	MPC · JPL
846666	2020 HD_{27}	—	February 23, 2015	Haleakala	Pan-STARRS 1	·	1.3 km	MPC · JPL
846667	2020 HV_{28}	—	May 27, 2011	Kitt Peak	Spacewatch	·	1.2 km	MPC · JPL
846668	2020 HJ_{34}	—	April 21, 2020	Haleakala	Pan-STARRS 1	·	540 m	MPC · JPL
846669	2020 HO_{34}	—	April 20, 2020	Haleakala	Pan-STARRS 1	·	1.1 km	MPC · JPL
846670	2020 HV_{34}	—	April 16, 2020	Mount Lemmon	Mount Lemmon Survey	·	840 m	MPC · JPL
846671	2020 HG_{35}	—	April 16, 2020	Mount Lemmon	Mount Lemmon Survey	·	1.1 km	MPC · JPL
846672	2020 HZ_{35}	—	October 9, 2016	Haleakala	Pan-STARRS 1	·	2.3 km	MPC · JPL
846673	2020 HQ_{37}	—	October 9, 2012	Mount Lemmon	Mount Lemmon Survey	·	1.4 km	MPC · JPL
846674	2020 HL_{38}	—	April 22, 2020	Haleakala	Pan-STARRS 1	·	1.2 km	MPC · JPL
846675	2020 HT_{39}	—	April 16, 2020	Mount Lemmon	Mount Lemmon Survey	·	1.3 km	MPC · JPL
846676	2020 HG_{46}	—	September 18, 2012	Mount Lemmon	Mount Lemmon Survey	ADE	1.3 km	MPC · JPL
846677	2020 HB_{47}	—	April 16, 2020	Haleakala	Pan-STARRS 2	·	890 m	MPC · JPL
846678	2020 HM_{51}	—	April 20, 2020	Haleakala	Pan-STARRS 1	EUN	780 m	MPC · JPL
846679	2020 HG_{52}	—	April 20, 2020	Haleakala	Pan-STARRS 1	·	1.3 km	MPC · JPL
846680	2020 HD_{57}	—	October 5, 2012	Haleakala	Pan-STARRS 1	L5	7.4 km	MPC · JPL
846681	2020 HR_{57}	—	April 21, 2020	Haleakala	Pan-STARRS 2	·	1.4 km	MPC · JPL
846682	2020 HB_{59}	—	August 7, 2016	Haleakala	Pan-STARRS 1	·	1.1 km	MPC · JPL
846683	2020 HY_{60}	—	April 24, 2020	Mount Lemmon	Mount Lemmon Survey	·	1.2 km	MPC · JPL
846684	2020 HO_{63}	—	April 28, 2020	Haleakala	Pan-STARRS 1	·	1.3 km	MPC · JPL
846685	2020 HU_{65}	—	April 20, 2020	Haleakala	Pan-STARRS 2	·	1.2 km	MPC · JPL
846686	2020 HZ_{65}	—	April 21, 2020	Haleakala	Pan-STARRS 2	·	1.1 km	MPC · JPL
846687	2020 HK_{67}	—	April 22, 2020	Haleakala	Pan-STARRS 1	L5	6.1 km	MPC · JPL
846688	2020 HC_{71}	—	September 19, 2017	Haleakala	Pan-STARRS 1	·	960 m	MPC · JPL
846689	2020 HS_{73}	—	April 22, 2020	Haleakala	Pan-STARRS 1	·	980 m	MPC · JPL
846690	2020 HA_{75}	—	April 16, 2020	Mount Lemmon	Mount Lemmon Survey	·	830 m	MPC · JPL
846691	2020 HW_{76}	—	February 26, 2011	Mount Lemmon	Mount Lemmon Survey	·	870 m	MPC · JPL
846692	2020 HZ_{76}	—	April 22, 2020	Haleakala	Pan-STARRS 1	ADE	1.4 km	MPC · JPL
846693	2020 HR_{90}	—	February 24, 2015	Haleakala	Pan-STARRS 1	·	1.3 km	MPC · JPL
846694	2020 HS_{91}	—	April 27, 2020	Haleakala	Pan-STARRS 1	·	1.7 km	MPC · JPL
846695	2020 HF_{100}	—	April 18, 2020	Haleakala	Pan-STARRS 1	·	950 m	MPC · JPL
846696	2020 HN_{102}	—	August 28, 2014	Haleakala	Pan-STARRS 1	·	480 m	MPC · JPL
846697	2020 HZ_{105}	—	April 16, 2020	Mount Lemmon	Mount Lemmon Survey	ADE	1.3 km	MPC · JPL
846698	2020 HX_{106}	—	November 17, 2017	Haleakala	Pan-STARRS 1	·	910 m	MPC · JPL
846699	2020 HL_{108}	—	October 28, 2017	Haleakala	Pan-STARRS 1	·	900 m	MPC · JPL
846700	2020 HQ_{109}	—	May 8, 2016	Mount Lemmon	Mount Lemmon Survey	·	1.0 km	MPC · JPL

== 846701–846800 ==
back to top

Designation			Discovery			Properties		Ref
Permanent	Provisional	Named after	Date	Site	Discoverer(s)	Category	Diam.	Ref
846701	2020 HO_{114}	—	April 27, 2020	Haleakala	Pan-STARRS 1	·	1.0 km	MPC · JPL
846702	2020 HP_{117}	—	April 22, 2020	Haleakala	Pan-STARRS 1	·	2.3 km	MPC · JPL
846703	2020 HZ_{119}	—	April 24, 2020	Mount Lemmon	Mount Lemmon Survey	·	930 m	MPC · JPL
846704	2020 HL_{122}	—	April 18, 2020	Haleakala	Pan-STARRS 1	EUN	880 m	MPC · JPL
846705	2020 HL_{125}	—	April 12, 2016	Haleakala	Pan-STARRS 1	·	900 m	MPC · JPL
846706	2020 HQ_{126}	—	April 21, 2020	Haleakala	Pan-STARRS 1	·	1.1 km	MPC · JPL
846707	2020 HY_{126}	—	September 19, 2017	Haleakala	Pan-STARRS 1	MAR	610 m	MPC · JPL
846708	2020 HM_{127}	—	April 25, 2020	Mount Lemmon	Mount Lemmon Survey	·	1.3 km	MPC · JPL
846709	2020 HR_{127}	—	October 8, 2008	Catalina	CSS	·	1.3 km	MPC · JPL
846710	2020 HQ_{130}	—	April 20, 2020	Haleakala	Pan-STARRS 1	·	1.2 km	MPC · JPL
846711	2020 HJ_{131}	—	April 16, 2020	Haleakala	Pan-STARRS 1	·	1.4 km	MPC · JPL
846712	2020 HH_{134}	—	April 27, 2020	Haleakala	Pan-STARRS 1	·	1.2 km	MPC · JPL
846713	2020 HR_{141}	—	April 19, 2020	Haleakala	Pan-STARRS 1	·	750 m	MPC · JPL
846714	2020 HL_{146}	—	April 20, 2015	Haleakala	Pan-STARRS 1	·	1.3 km	MPC · JPL
846715	2020 HK_{162}	—	April 16, 2020	Mount Lemmon	Mount Lemmon Survey	PHO	670 m	MPC · JPL
846716	2020 HW_{163}	—	April 20, 2020	Haleakala	Pan-STARRS 1	·	1.3 km	MPC · JPL
846717	2020 HJ_{180}	—	April 27, 2020	Haleakala	Pan-STARRS 1	L5	6.1 km	MPC · JPL
846718	2020 HG_{182}	—	September 17, 2017	Haleakala	Pan-STARRS 1	·	820 m	MPC · JPL
846719	2020 HM_{199}	—	April 21, 2015	Cerro Tololo	DECam	·	1.3 km	MPC · JPL
846720	2020 HJ_{209}	—	April 16, 2020	Haleakala	Pan-STARRS 1	·	1.8 km	MPC · JPL
846721	2020 HT_{210}	—	January 13, 2019	Haleakala	Pan-STARRS 1	·	1.5 km	MPC · JPL
846722	2020 JD_{4}	—	May 15, 2020	Haleakala	Pan-STARRS 1	L5	6.8 km	MPC · JPL
846723	2020 JM_{4}	—	May 14, 2020	Mount Lemmon	Mount Lemmon Survey	·	1.3 km	MPC · JPL
846724	2020 JR_{9}	—	May 11, 2020	Haleakala	Pan-STARRS 1	GEF	690 m	MPC · JPL
846725	2020 JA_{14}	—	January 27, 2015	Haleakala	Pan-STARRS 1	·	1.2 km	MPC · JPL
846726	2020 JH_{14}	—	April 23, 2015	Haleakala	Pan-STARRS 1	·	1.1 km	MPC · JPL
846727	2020 JJ_{19}	—	October 2, 2008	Kitt Peak	Spacewatch	·	1.1 km	MPC · JPL
846728	2020 JN_{19}	—	May 14, 2020	Haleakala	Pan-STARRS 1	·	1.2 km	MPC · JPL
846729	2020 JF_{20}	—	May 2, 2020	Mount Lemmon	Mount Lemmon Survey	(5)	810 m	MPC · JPL
846730	2020 JW_{22}	—	May 15, 2020	Haleakala	Pan-STARRS 1	·	1.2 km	MPC · JPL
846731	2020 JB_{24}	—	May 14, 2020	Haleakala	Pan-STARRS 1	MRX	770 m	MPC · JPL
846732	2020 JJ_{27}	—	May 14, 2020	Haleakala	Pan-STARRS 1	·	1.2 km	MPC · JPL
846733	2020 JX_{30}	—	July 5, 2016	Haleakala	Pan-STARRS 1	·	1.4 km	MPC · JPL
846734	2020 JC_{34}	—	May 15, 2020	Haleakala	Pan-STARRS 1	EUN	860 m	MPC · JPL
846735	2020 JF_{35}	—	May 11, 2020	Haleakala	Pan-STARRS 2	·	830 m	MPC · JPL
846736	2020 JD_{37}	—	October 2, 2000	Kitt Peak	Spacewatch	EUN	770 m	MPC · JPL
846737	2020 JM_{37}	—	May 15, 2020	Haleakala	Pan-STARRS 1	·	1.5 km	MPC · JPL
846738	2020 JX_{37}	—	September 17, 2012	Mount Lemmon	Mount Lemmon Survey	·	1.5 km	MPC · JPL
846739	2020 JG_{38}	—	May 15, 2020	Haleakala	Pan-STARRS 1	·	1.1 km	MPC · JPL
846740	2020 JX_{40}	—	October 8, 2012	Haleakala	Pan-STARRS 1	·	1.0 km	MPC · JPL
846741	2020 KC_{14}	—	March 11, 2016	Haleakala	Pan-STARRS 1	V	410 m	MPC · JPL
846742	2020 KV_{14}	—	May 21, 2020	Haleakala	Pan-STARRS 1	·	1.0 km	MPC · JPL
846743	2020 KB_{15}	—	February 20, 2015	Haleakala	Pan-STARRS 1	·	950 m	MPC · JPL
846744	2020 KU_{16}	—	June 12, 2015	Haleakala	Pan-STARRS 1	·	1.3 km	MPC · JPL
846745	2020 KG_{23}	—	September 13, 2017	Haleakala	Pan-STARRS 1	·	880 m	MPC · JPL
846746	2020 KM_{24}	—	May 20, 2020	Haleakala	Pan-STARRS 1	·	1.3 km	MPC · JPL
846747	2020 KZ_{28}	—	May 26, 2020	Mount Lemmon	Mount Lemmon Survey	EUN	940 m	MPC · JPL
846748	2020 KG_{30}	—	May 28, 2020	Haleakala	Pan-STARRS 1	·	1.0 km	MPC · JPL
846749	2020 KQ_{33}	—	May 18, 2020	Haleakala	Pan-STARRS 1	ADE	1.3 km	MPC · JPL
846750	2020 KH_{36}	—	October 8, 2012	Haleakala	Pan-STARRS 1	·	1.2 km	MPC · JPL
846751	2020 KJ_{36}	—	April 28, 2014	Cerro Tololo	DECam	·	2.5 km	MPC · JPL
846752	2020 KZ_{42}	—	March 3, 2010	WISE	WISE	·	1.2 km	MPC · JPL
846753	2020 KM_{43}	—	May 21, 2020	Haleakala	Pan-STARRS 1	EUN	760 m	MPC · JPL
846754	2020 KH_{46}	—	May 18, 2020	Mount Lemmon	Mount Lemmon Survey	H	290 m	MPC · JPL
846755	2020 KQ_{46}	—	August 7, 2016	Haleakala	Pan-STARRS 1	·	1.4 km	MPC · JPL
846756	2020 KR_{46}	—	October 24, 2011	Mount Lemmon	Mount Lemmon Survey	·	1.7 km	MPC · JPL
846757	2020 KC_{52}	—	May 20, 2020	Haleakala	Pan-STARRS 1	·	1.1 km	MPC · JPL
846758	2020 LE_{4}	—	June 15, 2020	Haleakala	Pan-STARRS 2	EUN	970 m	MPC · JPL
846759	2020 LS_{5}	—	June 15, 2020	Haleakala	Pan-STARRS 1	H	410 m	MPC · JPL
846760	2020 LZ_{11}	—	June 14, 2020	Haleakala	Pan-STARRS 1	·	1.4 km	MPC · JPL
846761	2020 LM_{12}	—	April 19, 2015	Cerro Tololo	DECam	·	1.2 km	MPC · JPL
846762	2020 LG_{15}	—	June 15, 2020	Haleakala	Pan-STARRS 1	EOS	1.5 km	MPC · JPL
846763	2020 LW_{15}	—	June 11, 2020	Mount Lemmon	Mount Lemmon Survey	EUN	1.1 km	MPC · JPL
846764	2020 LH_{16}	—	June 15, 2020	Haleakala	Pan-STARRS 1	·	1.2 km	MPC · JPL
846765	2020 MP_{9}	—	June 29, 2020	Haleakala	Pan-STARRS 1	·	1.4 km	MPC · JPL
846766	2020 MU_{9}	—	April 2, 2016	Haleakala	Pan-STARRS 1	·	510 m	MPC · JPL
846767	2020 MG_{10}	—	June 29, 2020	Haleakala	Pan-STARRS 2	·	1.7 km	MPC · JPL
846768	2020 ML_{10}	—	May 1, 2016	Haleakala	Pan-STARRS 1	·	460 m	MPC · JPL
846769	2020 MJ_{19}	—	June 17, 2020	Haleakala	Pan-STARRS 1	·	1.3 km	MPC · JPL
846770	2020 MN_{20}	—	June 29, 2020	Haleakala	Pan-STARRS 2	·	2.2 km	MPC · JPL
846771	2020 MM_{22}	—	June 22, 2020	ESA OGS	ESA OGS	·	1.8 km	MPC · JPL
846772	2020 MB_{27}	—	June 29, 2020	Haleakala	Pan-STARRS 1	EOS	1.2 km	MPC · JPL
846773	2020 MK_{31}	—	April 29, 2014	Cerro Tololo	DECam	EOS	1.1 km	MPC · JPL
846774	2020 MY_{41}	—	March 12, 2016	Haleakala	Pan-STARRS 1	·	770 m	MPC · JPL
846775	2020 MH_{42}	—	June 27, 2020	Haleakala	Pan-STARRS 1	·	2.4 km	MPC · JPL
846776	2020 MB_{43}	—	June 17, 2020	Haleakala	Pan-STARRS 1	WIT	630 m	MPC · JPL
846777	2020 MR_{47}	—	June 29, 2020	Haleakala	Pan-STARRS 1	KOR	850 m	MPC · JPL
846778	2020 MW_{49}	—	June 17, 2020	Haleakala	Pan-STARRS 1	·	2.2 km	MPC · JPL
846779	2020 MB_{51}	—	June 17, 2020	Haleakala	Pan-STARRS 1	·	2.0 km	MPC · JPL
846780	2020 MZ_{59}	—	June 28, 2020	Haleakala	Pan-STARRS 1	·	1.6 km	MPC · JPL
846781	2020 MN_{64}	—	June 21, 2020	Haleakala	Pan-STARRS 1	·	2.2 km	MPC · JPL
846782	2020 OL_{8}	—	November 25, 2013	Haleakala	Pan-STARRS 1	·	730 m	MPC · JPL
846783	2020 OM_{8}	—	November 16, 2015	Haleakala	Pan-STARRS 1	·	2.3 km	MPC · JPL
846784	2020 OJ_{9}	—	January 26, 2007	Kitt Peak	Spacewatch	PHO	640 m	MPC · JPL
846785	2020 OT_{9}	—	August 17, 2009	Catalina	CSS	·	2.5 km	MPC · JPL
846786	2020 OF_{12}	—	July 9, 2015	Haleakala	Pan-STARRS 1	H	280 m	MPC · JPL
846787	2020 OW_{13}	—	May 23, 2014	Haleakala	Pan-STARRS 1	NAE	1.7 km	MPC · JPL
846788	2020 OZ_{13}	—	July 27, 2020	Mount Lemmon	Mount Lemmon Survey	·	1.8 km	MPC · JPL
846789	2020 OF_{29}	—	July 22, 2020	Haleakala	Pan-STARRS 1	EOS	1.3 km	MPC · JPL
846790	2020 OK_{30}	—	March 23, 2015	Kitt Peak	L. H. Wasserman, M. W. Buie	MAS	550 m	MPC · JPL
846791	2020 OD_{31}	—	July 17, 2020	Haleakala	Pan-STARRS 1	·	1.7 km	MPC · JPL
846792	2020 OE_{32}	—	July 28, 2020	Haleakala	Pan-STARRS 1	·	1.8 km	MPC · JPL
846793	2020 OH_{32}	—	July 29, 2020	Haleakala	Pan-STARRS 1	·	1.2 km	MPC · JPL
846794	2020 OL_{32}	—	July 29, 2020	Haleakala	Pan-STARRS 1	·	620 m	MPC · JPL
846795	2020 OP_{33}	—	July 29, 2020	Haleakala	Pan-STARRS 1	·	1.5 km	MPC · JPL
846796	2020 OK_{45}	—	July 30, 2020	Mount Lemmon	Mount Lemmon Survey	H	340 m	MPC · JPL
846797	2020 OS_{60}	—	May 5, 2014	Cerro Tololo-DECam	DECam	BRA	1.0 km	MPC · JPL
846798	2020 OM_{63}	—	July 31, 2020	Haleakala	Pan-STARRS 1	H	350 m	MPC · JPL
846799	2020 OL_{64}	—	July 25, 2020	Haleakala	Pan-STARRS 1	·	820 m	MPC · JPL
846800	2020 OM_{79}	—	July 31, 2020	Haleakala	Pan-STARRS 1	·	2.0 km	MPC · JPL

== 846801–846900 ==
back to top

Designation			Discovery			Properties		Ref
Permanent	Provisional	Named after	Date	Site	Discoverer(s)	Category	Diam.	Ref
846801	2020 OP_{83}	—	July 17, 2020	Haleakala	Pan-STARRS 1	·	2.3 km	MPC · JPL
846802	2020 OM_{86}	—	November 2, 2015	Haleakala	Pan-STARRS 1	·	1.8 km	MPC · JPL
846803	2020 OC_{104}	—	July 18, 2020	Haleakala	Pan-STARRS 1	·	1.5 km	MPC · JPL
846804	2020 OG_{105}	—	July 17, 2020	Haleakala	Pan-STARRS 1	EOS	1.3 km	MPC · JPL
846805	2020 OV_{105}	—	April 28, 2014	Cerro Tololo	DECam	·	1.5 km	MPC · JPL
846806	2020 OB_{107}	—	July 18, 2020	Haleakala	Pan-STARRS 1	·	840 m	MPC · JPL
846807	2020 OP_{110}	—	July 28, 2014	Haleakala	Pan-STARRS 1	·	2.6 km	MPC · JPL
846808	2020 OK_{111}	—	July 18, 2020	Haleakala	Pan-STARRS 1	·	2.2 km	MPC · JPL
846809	2020 PV_{7}	—	June 25, 2015	Haleakala	Pan-STARRS 1	·	1.7 km	MPC · JPL
846810	2020 PV_{11}	—	October 24, 2015	Mount Lemmon	Mount Lemmon Survey	·	2.4 km	MPC · JPL
846811	2020 PO_{17}	—	August 14, 2020	Haleakala	Pan-STARRS 1	·	2.1 km	MPC · JPL
846812	2020 PH_{28}	—	May 20, 2014	Haleakala	Pan-STARRS 1	·	1.2 km	MPC · JPL
846813	2020 PP_{32}	—	September 12, 2004	Kitt Peak	Spacewatch	·	1.7 km	MPC · JPL
846814	2020 PM_{35}	—	August 14, 2020	Haleakala	Pan-STARRS 1	·	1.3 km	MPC · JPL
846815	2020 PM_{36}	—	November 11, 2016	Mount Lemmon	Mount Lemmon Survey	·	1.5 km	MPC · JPL
846816	2020 PL_{59}	—	August 13, 2020	Haleakala	Pan-STARRS 1	·	1.4 km	MPC · JPL
846817	2020 PU_{66}	—	August 14, 2020	Haleakala	Pan-STARRS 1	·	1.8 km	MPC · JPL
846818	2020 PR_{71}	—	November 23, 2016	Mount Lemmon	Mount Lemmon Survey	·	1.2 km	MPC · JPL
846819	2020 PO_{77}	—	August 15, 2020	Haleakala	Pan-STARRS 1	·	1.9 km	MPC · JPL
846820	2020 PC_{79}	—	April 5, 2016	Haleakala	Pan-STARRS 1	·	460 m	MPC · JPL
846821	2020 PA_{80}	—	August 15, 2020	Haleakala	Pan-STARRS 1	EOS	1.3 km	MPC · JPL
846822	2020 PD_{80}	—	October 14, 2010	Mount Lemmon	Mount Lemmon Survey	·	1.6 km	MPC · JPL
846823	2020 PK_{96}	—	August 15, 2020	Haleakala	Pan-STARRS 1	·	1.8 km	MPC · JPL
846824	2020 QB_{14}	—	August 16, 2020	Haleakala	Pan-STARRS 1	EOS	1.1 km	MPC · JPL
846825	2020 QQ_{14}	—	August 19, 2020	Haleakala	Pan-STARRS 1	·	2.0 km	MPC · JPL
846826	2020 QH_{15}	—	August 26, 2020	Mount Lemmon	Mount Lemmon Survey	TIR	2.1 km	MPC · JPL
846827	2020 QL_{15}	—	August 16, 2020	Haleakala	Pan-STARRS 2	·	990 m	MPC · JPL
846828	2020 QU_{16}	—	August 17, 2020	Haleakala	Pan-STARRS 1	·	2.0 km	MPC · JPL
846829	2020 QR_{18}	—	August 18, 2020	Haleakala	Pan-STARRS 2	·	2.0 km	MPC · JPL
846830	2020 QQ_{20}	—	August 30, 2020	Haleakala	Pan-STARRS 1	H	400 m	MPC · JPL
846831	2020 QS_{22}	—	August 28, 2020	Mount Lemmon	Mount Lemmon Survey	·	2.5 km	MPC · JPL
846832	2020 QG_{25}	—	November 2, 2010	Kitt Peak	Spacewatch	·	1.5 km	MPC · JPL
846833	2020 QW_{26}	—	August 18, 2020	Haleakala	Pan-STARRS 1	JUN	810 m	MPC · JPL
846834	2020 QE_{27}	—	July 17, 2020	Haleakala	Pan-STARRS 1	·	1.9 km	MPC · JPL
846835	2020 QW_{27}	—	October 4, 2013	Catalina	CSS	·	670 m	MPC · JPL
846836	2020 QA_{28}	—	August 23, 2020	Haleakala	Pan-STARRS 1	·	1.5 km	MPC · JPL
846837	2020 QQ_{30}	—	August 18, 2020	Haleakala	Pan-STARRS 1	·	1.9 km	MPC · JPL
846838	2020 QZ_{30}	—	August 23, 2020	Haleakala	Pan-STARRS 1	·	660 m	MPC · JPL
846839	2020 QD_{31}	—	April 29, 2014	Cerro Tololo	DECam	·	1.2 km	MPC · JPL
846840	2020 QO_{31}	—	August 23, 2020	Haleakala	Pan-STARRS 1	·	510 m	MPC · JPL
846841	2020 QU_{44}	—	April 24, 2014	Cerro Tololo	DECam	·	1.2 km	MPC · JPL
846842	2020 QD_{50}	—	August 18, 2020	Haleakala	Pan-STARRS 1	·	2.5 km	MPC · JPL
846843	2020 QR_{50}	—	April 24, 2014	Cerro Tololo	DECam	NEM	1.4 km	MPC · JPL
846844	2020 QQ_{51}	—	April 5, 2016	Haleakala	Pan-STARRS 1	L4	5.5 km	MPC · JPL
846845	2020 QL_{53}	—	August 26, 2020	Mount Lemmon	Mount Lemmon Survey	·	2.5 km	MPC · JPL
846846	2020 QA_{60}	—	August 19, 2020	Haleakala	Pan-STARRS 2	·	2.1 km	MPC · JPL
846847	2020 QY_{67}	—	August 22, 2020	Haleakala	Pan-STARRS 1	·	2.3 km	MPC · JPL
846848	2020 QT_{82}	—	August 31, 2014	Mount Lemmon	Mount Lemmon Survey	·	2.2 km	MPC · JPL
846849	2020 QW_{82}	—	August 19, 2020	Haleakala	Pan-STARRS 1	L4	6.5 km	MPC · JPL
846850	2020 QU_{83}	—	August 19, 2020	Haleakala	Pan-STARRS 1	·	2.0 km	MPC · JPL
846851	2020 QH_{85}	—	August 16, 2020	Haleakala	Pan-STARRS 1	EOS	1.2 km	MPC · JPL
846852	2020 QM_{85}	—	August 19, 2020	Haleakala	Pan-STARRS 1	EOS	1.3 km	MPC · JPL
846853	2020 QP_{85}	—	August 19, 2020	Haleakala	Pan-STARRS 2	URS	2.3 km	MPC · JPL
846854	2020 QT_{87}	—	August 21, 2015	Haleakala	Pan-STARRS 1	·	1.2 km	MPC · JPL
846855	2020 QG_{94}	—	August 23, 2020	Haleakala	Pan-STARRS 1	·	1.9 km	MPC · JPL
846856	2020 QG_{95}	—	August 17, 2020	Haleakala	Pan-STARRS 1	·	2.6 km	MPC · JPL
846857	2020 QF_{96}	—	August 17, 2020	Haleakala	Pan-STARRS 1	·	1.8 km	MPC · JPL
846858	2020 QE_{98}	—	January 17, 2018	Haleakala	Pan-STARRS 1	·	2.2 km	MPC · JPL
846859	2020 QF_{111}	—	February 8, 2013	Haleakala	Pan-STARRS 1	·	1.7 km	MPC · JPL
846860	2020 RJ_{10}	—	September 11, 2020	Haleakala	Pan-STARRS 1	·	860 m	MPC · JPL
846861	2020 RM_{10}	—	October 13, 2004	Kitt Peak	Spacewatch	·	2.1 km	MPC · JPL
846862	2020 RG_{12}	—	September 9, 2020	Haleakala	Pan-STARRS 1	·	1.6 km	MPC · JPL
846863	2020 RU_{23}	—	September 9, 2020	Haleakala	Pan-STARRS 1	·	2.4 km	MPC · JPL
846864	2020 RY_{23}	—	September 9, 2020	Haleakala	Pan-STARRS 1	·	770 m	MPC · JPL
846865	2020 RZ_{24}	—	September 13, 2020	Haleakala	Pan-STARRS 2	·	1.5 km	MPC · JPL
846866	2020 RJ_{25}	—	September 6, 1999	Kitt Peak	Spacewatch	·	910 m	MPC · JPL
846867	2020 RT_{25}	—	September 14, 2020	Haleakala	Pan-STARRS 2	·	2.1 km	MPC · JPL
846868	2020 RO_{26}	—	September 10, 2020	Mount Lemmon	Mount Lemmon Survey	·	1.8 km	MPC · JPL
846869	2020 RQ_{26}	—	September 12, 2020	Haleakala	Pan-STARRS 1	·	2.1 km	MPC · JPL
846870	2020 RR_{34}	—	September 23, 2012	Mount Lemmon	Mount Lemmon Survey	·	630 m	MPC · JPL
846871	2020 RN_{35}	—	September 18, 2003	Kitt Peak	Spacewatch	·	430 m	MPC · JPL
846872	2020 RX_{38}	—	April 21, 2009	Mount Lemmon	Mount Lemmon Survey	·	1.1 km	MPC · JPL
846873	2020 RG_{40}	—	December 18, 2015	Mount Lemmon	Mount Lemmon Survey	·	1.8 km	MPC · JPL
846874	2020 RW_{42}	—	July 7, 2014	Haleakala	Pan-STARRS 1	·	2.4 km	MPC · JPL
846875	2020 RY_{45}	—	September 14, 2020	Haleakala	Pan-STARRS 1	·	2.5 km	MPC · JPL
846876	2020 RT_{46}	—	September 14, 2014	Haleakala	Pan-STARRS 1	·	2.3 km	MPC · JPL
846877	2020 RO_{47}	—	September 14, 2020	Haleakala	Pan-STARRS 2	·	2.4 km	MPC · JPL
846878	2020 RB_{48}	—	September 14, 2020	Xingming	Sun, P., X. Gao	·	2.1 km	MPC · JPL
846879	2020 RE_{48}	—	October 24, 2013	Mount Lemmon	Mount Lemmon Survey	·	720 m	MPC · JPL
846880	2020 RA_{50}	—	September 15, 2020	Mount Lemmon	Mount Lemmon Survey	·	1.5 km	MPC · JPL
846881	2020 RP_{53}	—	June 29, 2019	Haleakala	Pan-STARRS 1	·	2.1 km	MPC · JPL
846882	2020 RL_{55}	—	September 12, 2020	Haleakala	Pan-STARRS 1	·	2.4 km	MPC · JPL
846883	2020 RS_{62}	—	September 10, 2020	Mount Lemmon	Mount Lemmon Survey	·	2.2 km	MPC · JPL
846884	2020 RO_{81}	—	October 12, 2016	Mount Lemmon	Mount Lemmon Survey	·	1.2 km	MPC · JPL
846885	2020 RH_{85}	—	September 12, 2020	Haleakala	Pan-STARRS 1	·	1.7 km	MPC · JPL
846886	2020 RT_{85}	—	December 5, 2010	Mount Lemmon	Mount Lemmon Survey	·	1.3 km	MPC · JPL
846887	2020 RD_{89}	—	August 3, 2014	Haleakala	Pan-STARRS 1	·	2.1 km	MPC · JPL
846888	2020 RT_{95}	—	September 6, 2020	Haleakala	Pan-STARRS 1	·	1.9 km	MPC · JPL
846889	2020 RA_{97}	—	April 10, 2015	Mount Lemmon	Mount Lemmon Survey	L4	5.6 km	MPC · JPL
846890	2020 RP_{99}	—	September 14, 2020	Haleakala	Pan-STARRS 1	L4	6.5 km	MPC · JPL
846891	2020 RU_{100}	—	September 14, 2020	Haleakala	Pan-STARRS 1	·	2.0 km	MPC · JPL
846892	2020 RL_{101}	—	February 16, 2017	Haleakala	Pan-STARRS 1	·	2.2 km	MPC · JPL
846893	2020 RO_{104}	—	September 9, 2020	Haleakala	Pan-STARRS 1	·	2.1 km	MPC · JPL
846894	2020 RT_{106}	—	September 13, 2020	Haleakala	Pan-STARRS 1	TIR	1.8 km	MPC · JPL
846895	2020 RW_{115}	—	December 5, 2015	Haleakala	Pan-STARRS 1	·	2.3 km	MPC · JPL
846896	2020 RN_{118}	—	November 12, 2010	Mount Lemmon	Mount Lemmon Survey	L4 · ERY	4.8 km	MPC · JPL
846897	2020 RT_{119}	—	April 18, 2015	Cerro Tololo	DECam	L4	5.6 km	MPC · JPL
846898	2020 RD_{126}	—	September 11, 2020	Haleakala	Pan-STARRS 2	·	1.9 km	MPC · JPL
846899	2020 RF_{128}	—	September 13, 2020	Haleakala	Pan-STARRS 1	·	680 m	MPC · JPL
846900	2020 RS_{140}	—	May 15, 2013	Haleakala	Pan-STARRS 1	·	2.3 km	MPC · JPL

== 846901–847000 ==
back to top

Designation			Discovery			Properties		Ref
Permanent	Provisional	Named after	Date	Site	Discoverer(s)	Category	Diam.	Ref
846901	2020 RW_{145}	—	July 25, 2014	Haleakala	Pan-STARRS 1	·	2.0 km	MPC · JPL
846902	2020 SV_{19}	—	February 25, 2012	Mount Lemmon	Mount Lemmon Survey	·	1.6 km	MPC · JPL
846903	2020 SV_{21}	—	August 21, 2014	Haleakala	Pan-STARRS 1	·	2.1 km	MPC · JPL
846904	2020 SN_{22}	—	September 4, 2011	Haleakala	Pan-STARRS 1	MRX	870 m	MPC · JPL
846905	2020 SG_{25}	—	September 20, 2020	Mount Lemmon	Mount Lemmon Survey	VER	2.0 km	MPC · JPL
846906	2020 SJ_{26}	—	November 16, 2003	Kitt Peak	Spacewatch	·	1.0 km	MPC · JPL
846907	2020 SL_{26}	—	November 1, 2006	Kitt Peak	Spacewatch	·	600 m	MPC · JPL
846908	2020 SM_{32}	—	September 26, 2020	Mount Lemmon	Mount Lemmon Survey	·	470 m	MPC · JPL
846909	2020 SH_{35}	—	September 17, 2020	Haleakala	Pan-STARRS 1	·	2.4 km	MPC · JPL
846910	2020 SN_{35}	—	September 26, 2020	Haleakala	Pan-STARRS 1	EUN	880 m	MPC · JPL
846911	2020 SG_{36}	—	June 7, 2019	Haleakala	Pan-STARRS 2	·	1.6 km	MPC · JPL
846912	2020 SV_{37}	—	September 26, 2020	Haleakala	Pan-STARRS 1	·	1.3 km	MPC · JPL
846913	2020 SZ_{38}	—	June 29, 2019	Haleakala	Pan-STARRS 1	·	990 m	MPC · JPL
846914	2020 SE_{61}	—	September 16, 2009	Kitt Peak	Spacewatch	·	1.8 km	MPC · JPL
846915	2020 SP_{68}	—	October 24, 2009	Kitt Peak	Spacewatch	·	2.6 km	MPC · JPL
846916	2020 SH_{70}	—	September 27, 2020	Mount Lemmon	Mount Lemmon Survey	·	2.5 km	MPC · JPL
846917	2020 SO_{77}	—	September 18, 2020	Haleakala	Pan-STARRS 1	EOS	1.3 km	MPC · JPL
846918	2020 ST_{77}	—	April 25, 2015	Mount Lemmon	Mount Lemmon Survey	V	420 m	MPC · JPL
846919	2020 SJ_{79}	—	November 7, 2015	Mount Lemmon	Mount Lemmon Survey	·	2.2 km	MPC · JPL
846920	2020 SO_{89}	—	September 16, 2020	Haleakala	Pan-STARRS 1	·	1.0 km	MPC · JPL
846921	2020 SX_{108}	—	September 4, 2014	Haleakala	Pan-STARRS 1	·	1.9 km	MPC · JPL
846922	2020 SZ_{108}	—	September 20, 2020	Mount Lemmon	Mount Lemmon Survey	VER	1.8 km	MPC · JPL
846923	2020 TA_{10}	—	September 4, 2015	Kitt Peak	Spacewatch	MRX	710 m	MPC · JPL
846924	2020 TE_{12}	—	June 2, 2014	Haleakala	Pan-STARRS 1	H	350 m	MPC · JPL
846925	2020 TV_{12}	—	October 14, 2020	Mount Lemmon	Mount Lemmon Survey	·	510 m	MPC · JPL
846926	2020 TC_{14}	—	January 7, 2016	XuYi	PMO NEO Survey Program	·	2.2 km	MPC · JPL
846927	2020 TY_{14}	—	February 1, 2012	Mount Lemmon	Mount Lemmon Survey	·	460 m	MPC · JPL
846928	2020 TB_{17}	—	November 9, 2013	Haleakala	Pan-STARRS 1	·	550 m	MPC · JPL
846929	2020 TK_{17}	—	March 23, 2004	Kitt Peak	Spacewatch	·	1.4 km	MPC · JPL
846930	2020 TP_{18}	—	September 22, 2014	Haleakala	Pan-STARRS 1	TIR	1.9 km	MPC · JPL
846931	2020 TY_{18}	—	September 17, 2014	Haleakala	Pan-STARRS 1	THM	1.7 km	MPC · JPL
846932	2020 TF_{19}	—	April 23, 2014	Cerro Tololo	DECam	·	800 m	MPC · JPL
846933	2020 TO_{19}	—	January 12, 2011	Mount Lemmon	Mount Lemmon Survey	·	1.6 km	MPC · JPL
846934	2020 TX_{19}	—	May 5, 2013	Haleakala	Pan-STARRS 1	·	2.1 km	MPC · JPL
846935	2020 TD_{23}	—	October 14, 2020	Haleakala	Pan-STARRS 2	·	2.1 km	MPC · JPL
846936	2020 TC_{26}	—	October 15, 2020	Haleakala	Pan-STARRS 1	·	2.8 km	MPC · JPL
846937	2020 TS_{28}	—	June 2, 2014	Haleakala	Pan-STARRS 1	·	1.9 km	MPC · JPL
846938	2020 TW_{28}	—	October 11, 2020	Mount Lemmon	Mount Lemmon Survey	·	950 m	MPC · JPL
846939	2020 TO_{29}	—	October 13, 2020	Mount Lemmon	Mount Lemmon Survey	ERI	1.1 km	MPC · JPL
846940	2020 TD_{36}	—	October 14, 2020	Haleakala	Pan-STARRS 1	·	3.1 km	MPC · JPL
846941	2020 TC_{58}	—	February 9, 2014	Mount Lemmon	Mount Lemmon Survey	MAS	490 m	MPC · JPL
846942	2020 TH_{72}	—	October 15, 2020	Haleakala	Pan-STARRS 1	·	2.1 km	MPC · JPL
846943	2020 TH_{77}	—	September 13, 2020	Haleakala	Pan-STARRS 1	L4	5.8 km	MPC · JPL
846944	2020 TS_{91}	—	October 15, 2020	Mount Lemmon	Mount Lemmon Survey	·	1.9 km	MPC · JPL
846945	2020 US_{8}	—	October 20, 2020	Haleakala	Pan-STARRS 2	·	1.4 km	MPC · JPL
846946	2020 UX_{9}	—	October 22, 2020	Haleakala	Pan-STARRS 2	·	2.3 km	MPC · JPL
846947	2020 UN_{11}	—	October 20, 2020	Haleakala	Pan-STARRS 1	·	1.4 km	MPC · JPL
846948	2020 UJ_{13}	—	October 17, 2020	Mount Lemmon	Mount Lemmon Survey	·	2.5 km	MPC · JPL
846949	2020 UX_{17}	—	October 23, 2020	Mount Lemmon	Mount Lemmon Survey	·	1.4 km	MPC · JPL
846950	2020 US_{19}	—	April 23, 2014	Cerro Tololo	DECam	ADE	1.1 km	MPC · JPL
846951	2020 UZ_{19}	—	December 9, 2012	Kitt Peak	Spacewatch	·	750 m	MPC · JPL
846952	2020 US_{36}	—	October 8, 2012	Haleakala	Pan-STARRS 1	T_{j} (2.98) · 3:2	4.5 km	MPC · JPL
846953	2020 UR_{43}	—	August 30, 2014	Haleakala	Pan-STARRS 1	T_{j} (2.98)	2.5 km	MPC · JPL
846954	2020 UA_{50}	—	April 23, 2015	Haleakala	Pan-STARRS 2	·	820 m	MPC · JPL
846955	2020 UT_{51}	—	May 23, 2014	Haleakala	Pan-STARRS 1	·	1.3 km	MPC · JPL
846956	2020 UE_{53}	—	September 17, 2010	Mount Lemmon	Mount Lemmon Survey	·	510 m	MPC · JPL
846957	2020 UT_{57}	—	October 23, 2020	Haleakala	Pan-STARRS 1	·	1.5 km	MPC · JPL
846958	2020 VY_{6}	—	November 8, 2020	Haleakala	Pan-STARRS 1	H	380 m	MPC · JPL
846959	2020 VK_{7}	—	November 11, 2020	Mount Lemmon	Mount Lemmon Survey	·	1.0 km	MPC · JPL
846960	2020 VN_{7}	—	November 11, 2020	Mount Lemmon	Mount Lemmon Survey	·	700 m	MPC · JPL
846961	2020 VU_{7}	—	May 2, 2014	Cerro Tololo-DECam	DECam	·	1.1 km	MPC · JPL
846962	2020 VV_{7}	—	April 29, 2014	Cerro Tololo	DECam	·	950 m	MPC · JPL
846963	2020 VM_{8}	—	November 15, 2020	Mount Lemmon	Mount Lemmon Survey	HNS	740 m	MPC · JPL
846964	2020 VT_{8}	—	November 11, 2020	Mount Lemmon	Mount Lemmon Survey	·	670 m	MPC · JPL
846965	2020 VX_{9}	—	September 15, 2020	Haleakala	Pan-STARRS 1	H	370 m	MPC · JPL
846966	2020 VL_{22}	—	October 29, 2014	Haleakala	Pan-STARRS 1	·	2.4 km	MPC · JPL
846967	2020 WB_{7}	—	November 22, 2020	Mount Lemmon	Mount Lemmon Survey	·	550 m	MPC · JPL
846968	2020 WZ_{11}	—	April 22, 2014	Cerro Tololo	DECam	·	980 m	MPC · JPL
846969	2020 WL_{13}	—	January 23, 2011	Mount Lemmon	Mount Lemmon Survey	·	430 m	MPC · JPL
846970	2020 WP_{17}	—	December 7, 2013	Mount Lemmon	Mount Lemmon Survey	V	450 m	MPC · JPL
846971	2020 WN_{19}	—	November 17, 2020	Haleakala	Pan-STARRS 1	·	920 m	MPC · JPL
846972	2020 XG_{13}	—	April 18, 2006	Kitt Peak	Spacewatch	·	1.7 km	MPC · JPL
846973	2020 XA_{19}	—	September 5, 2007	Mount Lemmon	Mount Lemmon Survey	·	2.2 km	MPC · JPL
846974	2020 XR_{19}	—	August 28, 2003	Palomar	NEAT	EUN	1.1 km	MPC · JPL
846975	2020 YC_{6}	—	December 18, 2020	Mount Lemmon	Mount Lemmon Survey	H	420 m	MPC · JPL
846976	2020 YK_{6}	—	August 8, 2016	Haleakala	Pan-STARRS 1	·	640 m	MPC · JPL
846977	2020 YC_{7}	—	December 18, 2020	Mount Lemmon	Mount Lemmon Survey	·	950 m	MPC · JPL
846978	2020 YT_{9}	—	March 13, 2011	Kitt Peak	Spacewatch	·	580 m	MPC · JPL
846979	2020 YX_{19}	—	January 10, 2013	Haleakala	Pan-STARRS 1	·	770 m	MPC · JPL
846980	2020 YH_{24}	—	August 8, 2018	Haleakala	Pan-STARRS 1	URS	2.1 km	MPC · JPL
846981	2020 YO_{25}	—	January 17, 2016	Haleakala	Pan-STARRS 1	·	1.9 km	MPC · JPL
846982	2021 AF_{11}	—	November 26, 2014	Haleakala	Pan-STARRS 1	TIR	2.4 km	MPC · JPL
846983	2021 AD_{12}	—	January 4, 2021	Mount Lemmon	Mount Lemmon Survey	·	840 m	MPC · JPL
846984	2021 AW_{19}	—	March 10, 2016	Mount Lemmon	Mount Lemmon Survey	·	2.3 km	MPC · JPL
846985	2021 AY_{29}	—	January 12, 2021	Haleakala	Pan-STARRS 1	·	910 m	MPC · JPL
846986	2021 BZ_{8}	—	December 31, 2013	Kitt Peak	Spacewatch	·	530 m	MPC · JPL
846987	2021 BN_{9}	—	April 23, 2018	Mount Lemmon	Mount Lemmon Survey	·	510 m	MPC · JPL
846988	2021 BG_{21}	—	January 18, 2021	Mount Lemmon	Mount Lemmon Survey	·	900 m	MPC · JPL
846989	2021 CA_{11}	—	March 4, 2011	Mount Lemmon	Mount Lemmon Survey	·	490 m	MPC · JPL
846990	2021 CA_{13}	—	April 29, 2014	Cerro Tololo	DECam	·	750 m	MPC · JPL
846991	2021 CL_{14}	—	February 7, 2021	Mount Lemmon	Mount Lemmon Survey	PHO	640 m	MPC · JPL
846992	2021 CX_{15}	—	April 30, 2014	Haleakala	Pan-STARRS 1	·	730 m	MPC · JPL
846993	2021 CC_{18}	—	January 18, 2015	Haleakala	Pan-STARRS 1	·	2.1 km	MPC · JPL
846994	2021 CU_{24}	—	January 3, 2013	Mount Lemmon	Mount Lemmon Survey	·	920 m	MPC · JPL
846995	2021 CO_{25}	—	April 9, 2010	Kitt Peak	Spacewatch	·	840 m	MPC · JPL
846996	2021 CW_{25}	—	February 11, 2002	Kitt Peak	Spacewatch	NYS	990 m	MPC · JPL
846997	2021 CE_{39}	—	June 30, 2014	Haleakala	Pan-STARRS 1	·	830 m	MPC · JPL
846998	2021 DW_{13}	—	December 16, 2014	Haleakala	Pan-STARRS 1	·	1.5 km	MPC · JPL
846999	2021 DC_{15}	—	February 16, 2021	Haleakala	Pan-STARRS 1	V	460 m	MPC · JPL
847000	2021 DL_{20}	—	February 17, 2021	Haleakala	Pan-STARRS 1	·	1.5 km	MPC · JPL

== Meaning of names ==
As minor planet discoveries are confirmed, they are given a permanent number by the IAU's Minor Planet Center (MPC), and the discoverers can then submit names for them, following the IAU's naming conventions. The list below concerns those minor planets in the specified number-range that have received names, and explains the meanings of those names.

Official naming citations of newly named small Solar System bodies are approved and published in a bulletin by IAU's Working Group for Small Bodies Nomenclature (WGSBN). Before May 2021, citations were published in MPC's Minor Planet Circulars for many decades. Recent citations can also be found on the JPL Small-Body Database (SBDB). Until his death in 2016, German astronomer Lutz D. Schmadel compiled these citations into the Dictionary of Minor Planet Names (DMP) and regularly updated the collection.

Based on Paul Herget's The Names of the Minor Planets, Schmadel also researched the unclear origin of numerous asteroids, most of which had been named prior to World War II. This article incorporates text from this source, which is in the public domain: SBDB New namings may only be added to this list below after official publication as the preannouncement of names is condemned. The WGSBN publishes a comprehensive guideline for the naming rules of non-cometary small Solar System bodies.

Named minor planet	Provisional	This minor planet was named for...	Ref · Catalog
846464 Vaižgantas	2019 RS_{14}	Juozas Tumas Vaižgantas, Lithuanian Roman Catholic priest. He was a writer whose most notable works are the novel Pragiedruliai (Cloud Clearing) and the narrative Dėdės ir dėdienės (Uncles and Aunts).	IAU · 846464
