= List of minor planets: 792001–793000 =

The following is a partial list of minor planets, running from minor-planet number 792001 through 793000, inclusive. The primary data for this and other partial lists is based on JPL's "Small-Body Orbital Elements" and data available from the Minor Planet Center. Critical list information is also provided by the MPC, unless otherwise specified from Lowell Observatory. A detailed description of the table's columns and additional sources are given on the main page including a complete list of every page in this series, and a statistical break-up on the dynamical classification of minor planets.

Also see the summary list of all named bodies in numerical and alphabetical order, and the corresponding naming citations for the number range of this particular list. New namings may only be added to this list after official publication, as the preannouncement of names is condemned by the Working Group for Small Bodies Nomenclature of the International Astronomical Union.

Near-Earth obj.	MBA (inner)	MBA (outer)	Centaur
Mars-crosser	MBA (middle)	Jupiter trojan	Trans-Neptunian obj.
Unclassified

== 792001–792100 ==
Designation			Discovery			Properties		Ref
Permanent	Provisional	Named after	Date	Site	Discoverer(s)	Category	Diam.	Ref
792001	2020 QX_{84}	—	August 16, 2020	Haleakala	Pan-STARRS 1	·	1.9 km	MPC · JPL
792002	2020 QY_{84}	—	August 19, 2020	Haleakala	Pan-STARRS 1	L4 · ERY	5.7 km	MPC · JPL
792003	2020 QP_{88}	—	November 13, 2010	Mount Lemmon	Mount Lemmon Survey	L4 · ERY	5.7 km	MPC · JPL
792004	2020 QX_{88}	—	August 19, 2020	Haleakala	Pan-STARRS 1	L4	5.5 km	MPC · JPL
792005	2020 QL_{94}	—	August 19, 2020	Haleakala	Pan-STARRS 1	L4	5.1 km	MPC · JPL
792006	2020 QQ_{96}	—	August 16, 2020	Haleakala	Pan-STARRS 1	·	1.2 km	MPC · JPL
792007	2020 RV_{1}	—	June 30, 2019	Haleakala	Pan-STARRS 1	L4	7.6 km	MPC · JPL
792008	2020 RZ_{10}	—	August 30, 2016	Haleakala	Pan-STARRS 1	·	1.2 km	MPC · JPL
792009	2020 RR_{12}	—	May 11, 2019	Haleakala	Pan-STARRS 1	·	1.1 km	MPC · JPL
792010	2020 RR_{41}	—	September 13, 2020	Haleakala	Pan-STARRS 1	L4	5.9 km	MPC · JPL
792011	2020 RC_{43}	—	March 13, 2011	Kitt Peak	Spacewatch	·	780 m	MPC · JPL
792012	2020 RJ_{51}	—	April 3, 2016	Haleakala	Pan-STARRS 1	L4	6.4 km	MPC · JPL
792013	2020 RO_{51}	—	September 12, 2020	Haleakala	Pan-STARRS 1	L4 · ERY	4.9 km	MPC · JPL
792014	2020 RX_{54}	—	April 23, 2014	Cerro Tololo	DECam	HOF	1.7 km	MPC · JPL
792015	2020 RZ_{54}	—	September 9, 2020	Haleakala	Pan-STARRS 1	L4	5.6 km	MPC · JPL
792016	2020 RK_{77}	—	May 21, 2015	Haleakala	Pan-STARRS 1	·	810 m	MPC · JPL
792017	2020 RN_{78}	—	August 18, 2009	Kitt Peak	Spacewatch	·	1.8 km	MPC · JPL
792018	2020 RM_{86}	—	September 12, 2020	Haleakala	Pan-STARRS 1	L4	6.4 km	MPC · JPL
792019	2020 RW_{86}	—	September 9, 2020	Haleakala	Pan-STARRS 1	L4	6.1 km	MPC · JPL
792020	2020 RG_{88}	—	January 1, 2012	Mount Lemmon	Mount Lemmon Survey	L4	6.5 km	MPC · JPL
792021	2020 RE_{91}	—	December 2, 2010	Kitt Peak	Spacewatch	L4	6.1 km	MPC · JPL
792022	2020 RQ_{92}	—	May 21, 2015	Cerro Tololo	DECam	·	600 m	MPC · JPL
792023	2020 RJ_{93}	—	December 29, 2011	Mount Lemmon	Mount Lemmon Survey	L4	6.2 km	MPC · JPL
792024	2020 RK_{93}	—	January 10, 2013	Haleakala	Pan-STARRS 1	L4	6.2 km	MPC · JPL
792025	2020 RC_{94}	—	May 27, 2019	Haleakala	Pan-STARRS 1	·	830 m	MPC · JPL
792026	2020 RC_{99}	—	September 13, 2020	Haleakala	Pan-STARRS 2	L4	5.7 km	MPC · JPL
792027	2020 RN_{100}	—	November 24, 2009	Mount Lemmon	Mount Lemmon Survey	L4	5.9 km	MPC · JPL
792028	2020 RF_{102}	—	August 5, 2019	Haleakala	Pan-STARRS 1	L4	5.6 km	MPC · JPL
792029	2020 RC_{105}	—	September 10, 2020	Mount Lemmon	Mount Lemmon Survey	L4	5.6 km	MPC · JPL
792030	2020 RQ_{105}	—	September 12, 2020	Haleakala	Pan-STARRS 1	·	1.1 km	MPC · JPL
792031	2020 RH_{110}	—	September 12, 2020	Haleakala	Pan-STARRS 2	L4	6.6 km	MPC · JPL
792032	2020 RZ_{110}	—	April 18, 2015	Cerro Tololo	DECam	L4	5.9 km	MPC · JPL
792033	2020 RS_{117}	—	November 12, 2010	Mount Lemmon	Mount Lemmon Survey	L4	5.2 km	MPC · JPL
792034	2020 RW_{117}	—	September 10, 2020	Mount Lemmon	Mount Lemmon Survey	L4	6.0 km	MPC · JPL
792035	2020 RA_{118}	—	April 18, 2015	Cerro Tololo	DECam	L4	5.4 km	MPC · JPL
792036	2020 RJ_{118}	—	September 12, 2020	Haleakala	Pan-STARRS 1	L4	5.6 km	MPC · JPL
792037	2020 RM_{118}	—	October 1, 2008	Mount Lemmon	Mount Lemmon Survey	L4	6.4 km	MPC · JPL
792038	2020 RP_{118}	—	October 26, 2009	Mount Lemmon	Mount Lemmon Survey	L4	6.1 km	MPC · JPL
792039	2020 RS_{118}	—	September 13, 2020	Haleakala	Pan-STARRS 1	L4	5.7 km	MPC · JPL
792040	2020 RA_{119}	—	January 1, 2012	Mount Lemmon	Mount Lemmon Survey	L4	6.3 km	MPC · JPL
792041	2020 RK_{119}	—	October 22, 2009	Mount Lemmon	Mount Lemmon Survey	L4	6.1 km	MPC · JPL
792042	2020 RL_{119}	—	April 18, 2015	Cerro Tololo	DECam	L4	5.6 km	MPC · JPL
792043	2020 RP_{119}	—	September 13, 2020	Haleakala	Pan-STARRS 2	L4	6.0 km	MPC · JPL
792044	2020 RU_{119}	—	September 9, 2020	Haleakala	Pan-STARRS 1	L4	6.5 km	MPC · JPL
792045	2020 RX_{119}	—	September 13, 2020	Haleakala	Pan-STARRS 1	L4	5.8 km	MPC · JPL
792046	2020 RM_{120}	—	April 18, 2015	Cerro Tololo	DECam	L4	4.7 km	MPC · JPL
792047	2020 RT_{123}	—	September 14, 2020	Haleakala	Pan-STARRS 1	·	1.3 km	MPC · JPL
792048	2020 RQ_{125}	—	November 27, 2010	Mount Lemmon	Mount Lemmon Survey	L4	5.2 km	MPC · JPL
792049	2020 RS_{125}	—	October 18, 2012	Haleakala	Pan-STARRS 1	·	1.1 km	MPC · JPL
792050	2020 RU_{128}	—	September 12, 2020	Haleakala	Pan-STARRS 1	L4	6.3 km	MPC · JPL
792051	2020 RC_{159}	—	September 14, 2020	Haleakala	Pan-STARRS 1	EOS	1.2 km	MPC · JPL
792052	2020 SE_{23}	—	December 3, 2012	Mount Lemmon	Mount Lemmon Survey	(5)	920 m	MPC · JPL
792053	2020 SV_{26}	—	September 15, 2020	XuYi	PMO NEO Survey Program	·	1.1 km	MPC · JPL
792054	2020 SH_{33}	—	May 19, 2015	Cerro Tololo	DECam	L4	6.4 km	MPC · JPL
792055	2020 SE_{36}	—	September 17, 2020	Haleakala	Pan-STARRS 1	·	1.1 km	MPC · JPL
792056	2020 SG_{37}	—	September 27, 2020	Haleakala	Pan-STARRS 1	HOF	1.9 km	MPC · JPL
792057	2020 SW_{54}	—	September 14, 2007	Mount Lemmon	Mount Lemmon Survey	·	1.0 km	MPC · JPL
792058	2020 SD_{63}	—	September 26, 2020	Haleakala	Pan-STARRS 1	L4	5.8 km	MPC · JPL
792059	2020 SG_{63}	—	October 2, 2008	Mount Lemmon	Mount Lemmon Survey	L4	6.2 km	MPC · JPL
792060	2020 SY_{71}	—	September 23, 2020	Haleakala	Pan-STARRS 1	L4	6.2 km	MPC · JPL
792061	2020 SG_{76}	—	September 17, 2020	Haleakala	Pan-STARRS 2	L4	6.1 km	MPC · JPL
792062	2020 SA_{78}	—	April 23, 2014	Cerro Tololo	DECam	·	1.0 km	MPC · JPL
792063	2020 SH_{78}	—	September 28, 2020	Haleakala	Pan-STARRS 1	·	1.2 km	MPC · JPL
792064	2020 SK_{82}	—	September 17, 2020	Haleakala	Pan-STARRS 2	L4	7.1 km	MPC · JPL
792065	2020 SA_{83}	—	February 14, 2012	Haleakala	Pan-STARRS 1	·	1.3 km	MPC · JPL
792066	2020 SC_{84}	—	April 18, 2015	Cerro Tololo	DECam	L4	6.1 km	MPC · JPL
792067	2020 SD_{84}	—	April 18, 2015	Cerro Tololo	DECam	L4	5.3 km	MPC · JPL
792068	2020 SF_{84}	—	September 17, 2020	Haleakala	Pan-STARRS 1	L4	7.1 km	MPC · JPL
792069	2020 SQ_{84}	—	April 18, 2015	Cerro Tololo	DECam	L4	5.4 km	MPC · JPL
792070	2020 SK_{85}	—	February 14, 2013	Mount Lemmon	Mount Lemmon Survey	·	1.4 km	MPC · JPL
792071	2020 SU_{88}	—	September 16, 2020	Haleakala	Pan-STARRS 1	·	1.1 km	MPC · JPL
792072	2020 SV_{94}	—	September 15, 2007	Kitt Peak	Spacewatch	·	1.1 km	MPC · JPL
792073	2020 SZ_{97}	—	November 27, 2000	Apache Point	SDSS	L4	7.0 km	MPC · JPL
792074	2020 SG_{98}	—	September 18, 2020	Haleakala	Pan-STARRS 1	L4	6.5 km	MPC · JPL
792075	2020 SG_{111}	—	April 19, 2015	Cerro Tololo	DECam	L4	4.7 km	MPC · JPL
792076	2020 TF_{2}	—	July 16, 2018	Haleakala	Pan-STARRS 2	L4	7.1 km	MPC · JPL
792077	2020 TV_{17}	—	September 9, 2007	Kitt Peak	Spacewatch	·	970 m	MPC · JPL
792078	2020 TC_{19}	—	October 22, 1995	Kitt Peak	Spacewatch	·	860 m	MPC · JPL
792079	2020 TV_{19}	—	November 4, 2016	Haleakala	Pan-STARRS 1	·	840 m	MPC · JPL
792080	2020 TR_{20}	—	October 14, 2020	Mount Lemmon	Mount Lemmon Survey	·	1.2 km	MPC · JPL
792081	2020 TQ_{23}	—	October 7, 2020	Haleakala	Pan-STARRS 1	·	1.2 km	MPC · JPL
792082	2020 TR_{23}	—	October 12, 2020	Mount Lemmon	Mount Lemmon Survey	·	2.3 km	MPC · JPL
792083	2020 TY_{23}	—	October 15, 2020	Mount Lemmon	Mount Lemmon Survey	·	1.2 km	MPC · JPL
792084	2020 TZ_{23}	—	October 15, 2020	Mount Lemmon	Mount Lemmon Survey	HOF	2.1 km	MPC · JPL
792085	2020 TN_{24}	—	October 12, 2020	Mount Lemmon	Mount Lemmon Survey	·	1.3 km	MPC · JPL
792086	2020 TC_{25}	—	October 13, 2020	Mount Lemmon	Mount Lemmon Survey	·	1.4 km	MPC · JPL
792087	2020 TQ_{25}	—	October 15, 2020	Haleakala	Pan-STARRS 1	·	1.1 km	MPC · JPL
792088	2020 TN_{26}	—	October 14, 2020	Mount Lemmon	Mount Lemmon Survey	EUN	810 m	MPC · JPL
792089	2020 TQ_{26}	—	October 15, 2020	Haleakala	Pan-STARRS 1	·	870 m	MPC · JPL
792090	2020 TH_{27}	—	October 15, 2020	Mount Lemmon	Mount Lemmon Survey	·	950 m	MPC · JPL
792091	2020 TS_{30}	—	October 15, 2020	Mount Lemmon	Mount Lemmon Survey	EUN	990 m	MPC · JPL
792092	2020 TU_{30}	—	October 14, 2020	Haleakala	Pan-STARRS 1	·	1.1 km	MPC · JPL
792093	2020 TG_{32}	—	October 14, 2020	Mount Lemmon	Mount Lemmon Survey	MAR	770 m	MPC · JPL
792094	2020 TK_{56}	—	April 26, 2014	Cerro Tololo	DECam	·	1.1 km	MPC · JPL
792095	2020 TR_{60}	—	July 19, 2015	Haleakala	Pan-STARRS 1	·	890 m	MPC · JPL
792096	2020 TN_{65}	—	January 22, 2012	Haleakala	Pan-STARRS 1	·	2.6 km	MPC · JPL
792097	2020 TK_{68}	—	May 21, 2014	Haleakala	Pan-STARRS 1	(12739)	1.2 km	MPC · JPL
792098	2020 TY_{70}	—	July 25, 2015	Haleakala	Pan-STARRS 1	·	1.2 km	MPC · JPL
792099	2020 TB_{74}	—	April 22, 2014	Cerro Tololo	DECam	·	1.0 km	MPC · JPL
792100	2020 TW_{77}	—	October 13, 2020	Haleakala	Pan-STARRS 1	L4	6.8 km	MPC · JPL

== 792101–792200 ==
back to top

Designation			Discovery			Properties		Ref
Permanent	Provisional	Named after	Date	Site	Discoverer(s)	Category	Diam.	Ref
792101	2020 TO_{78}	—	June 15, 2018	Haleakala	Pan-STARRS 1	L4	5.8 km	MPC · JPL
792102	2020 TR_{80}	—	October 25, 2009	Kitt Peak	Spacewatch	L4 · ERY	5.2 km	MPC · JPL
792103	2020 UG_{5}	—	October 23, 2020	Haleakala	Pan-STARRS 1	L4	5.3 km	MPC · JPL
792104	2020 UJ_{6}	—	October 22, 2020	Mount Lemmon	Mount Lemmon Survey	AMO	410 m	MPC · JPL
792105	2020 UR_{9}	—	October 20, 2020	Haleakala	Pan-STARRS 1	KOR	930 m	MPC · JPL
792106	2020 UG_{10}	—	October 26, 2020	Haleakala	Pan-STARRS 1	·	680 m	MPC · JPL
792107	2020 UJ_{10}	—	October 20, 2020	Haleakala	Pan-STARRS 1	·	1.2 km	MPC · JPL
792108	2020 UP_{10}	—	April 23, 2014	Cerro Tololo	DECam	(5)	860 m	MPC · JPL
792109	2020 UZ_{10}	—	October 22, 2020	Haleakala	Pan-STARRS 1	(5)	850 m	MPC · JPL
792110	2020 UA_{11}	—	April 23, 2014	Cerro Tololo	DECam	·	740 m	MPC · JPL
792111	2020 UQ_{11}	—	October 23, 2020	Mount Lemmon	Mount Lemmon Survey	·	1.2 km	MPC · JPL
792112	2020 UZ_{11}	—	October 22, 2020	Haleakala	Pan-STARRS 1	(5)	880 m	MPC · JPL
792113	2020 UB_{12}	—	October 16, 2020	Mount Lemmon	Mount Lemmon Survey	EUN	770 m	MPC · JPL
792114	2020 UG_{12}	—	October 28, 2020	Mount Lemmon	Mount Lemmon Survey	·	2.0 km	MPC · JPL
792115	2020 US_{12}	—	May 25, 2010	WISE	WISE	·	1.5 km	MPC · JPL
792116	2020 UW_{14}	—	October 22, 2020	Haleakala	Pan-STARRS 1	·	940 m	MPC · JPL
792117	2020 UA_{15}	—	October 22, 2020	Haleakala	Pan-STARRS 1	·	940 m	MPC · JPL
792118	2020 UE_{36}	—	December 31, 2011	Mount Lemmon	Mount Lemmon Survey	·	1.3 km	MPC · JPL
792119	2020 UC_{45}	—	September 23, 2008	Kitt Peak	Spacewatch	L4 · ERY	5.9 km	MPC · JPL
792120	2020 UO_{49}	—	October 20, 2020	Haleakala	Pan-STARRS 1	·	2.4 km	MPC · JPL
792121 Boldea	2020 UX_{49}	Boldea	October 27, 2020	La Palma	Vaduvescu, O., Simpson-Parry, J.	·	880 m	MPC · JPL
792122	2020 UP_{50}	—	October 29, 2020	Mount Lemmon	Mount Lemmon Survey	·	1.4 km	MPC · JPL
792123	2020 UH_{53}	—	October 22, 2020	Haleakala	Pan-STARRS 1	(5)	800 m	MPC · JPL
792124	2020 UK_{53}	—	October 20, 2020	Haleakala	Pan-STARRS 1	·	900 m	MPC · JPL
792125	2020 UQ_{53}	—	October 22, 2020	Haleakala	Pan-STARRS 1	·	1.3 km	MPC · JPL
792126	2020 US_{54}	—	October 23, 2020	Haleakala	Pan-STARRS 1	L4	6.0 km	MPC · JPL
792127	2020 UT_{54}	—	May 21, 2015	Haleakala	Pan-STARRS 1	L4	5.5 km	MPC · JPL
792128	2020 UY_{54}	—	October 24, 2020	Mount Lemmon	Mount Lemmon Survey	·	1.2 km	MPC · JPL
792129	2020 UT_{58}	—	October 19, 2020	Haleakala	Pan-STARRS 1	·	740 m	MPC · JPL
792130	2020 UJ_{69}	—	September 11, 2007	Kitt Peak	Spacewatch	(5)	1.1 km	MPC · JPL
792131	2020 UF_{76}	—	October 13, 2020	Mount Lemmon	Mount Lemmon Survey	·	920 m	MPC · JPL
792132	2020 VL_{7}	—	November 14, 2020	Haleakala	Pan-STARRS 2	·	1.0 km	MPC · JPL
792133	2020 VZ_{7}	—	November 14, 2020	Mount Lemmon	Mount Lemmon Survey	·	900 m	MPC · JPL
792134	2020 VO_{9}	—	November 10, 2020	Haleakala	Pan-STARRS 1	EUN	790 m	MPC · JPL
792135	2020 VV_{9}	—	November 15, 2020	Mount Lemmon	Mount Lemmon Survey	JUN	700 m	MPC · JPL
792136	2020 VR_{14}	—	October 22, 2011	Mount Lemmon	Mount Lemmon Survey	(12739)	1.2 km	MPC · JPL
792137	2020 VL_{17}	—	November 13, 2020	Haleakala	Pan-STARRS 1	·	1.2 km	MPC · JPL
792138	2020 VM_{21}	—	November 14, 2020	Mount Lemmon	Mount Lemmon Survey	(5)	890 m	MPC · JPL
792139	2020 VV_{23}	—	November 13, 2020	Mount Lemmon	Mount Lemmon Survey	EUN	1.0 km	MPC · JPL
792140	2020 VC_{24}	—	November 13, 2020	Haleakala	Pan-STARRS 1	·	1.3 km	MPC · JPL
792141	2020 VX_{24}	—	November 10, 2016	Haleakala	Pan-STARRS 1	·	1.4 km	MPC · JPL
792142	2020 VC_{25}	—	November 11, 2020	Mount Lemmon	Mount Lemmon Survey	(5)	920 m	MPC · JPL
792143	2020 VM_{26}	—	November 9, 2009	Mount Lemmon	Mount Lemmon Survey	·	2.0 km	MPC · JPL
792144	2020 VF_{27}	—	November 11, 2020	Mount Lemmon	Mount Lemmon Survey	·	1.5 km	MPC · JPL
792145	2020 WG_{6}	—	April 28, 2014	Cerro Tololo	DECam	·	860 m	MPC · JPL
792146	2020 WR_{6}	—	April 24, 2014	Cerro Tololo	DECam	·	580 m	MPC · JPL
792147	2020 WC_{7}	—	April 23, 2014	Cerro Tololo	DECam	·	770 m	MPC · JPL
792148	2020 WZ_{8}	—	November 23, 2020	Mount Lemmon	Mount Lemmon Survey	·	980 m	MPC · JPL
792149	2020 WU_{12}	—	November 23, 2020	Mount Lemmon	Mount Lemmon Survey	ADE	1.3 km	MPC · JPL
792150	2020 WT_{16}	—	November 21, 2020	Mount Lemmon	Mount Lemmon Survey	MAR	920 m	MPC · JPL
792151	2020 WA_{17}	—	November 16, 2020	Haleakala	Pan-STARRS 1	BRG	1.2 km	MPC · JPL
792152	2020 WC_{20}	—	July 14, 2013	Haleakala	Pan-STARRS 1	·	2.1 km	MPC · JPL
792153	2020 WY_{21}	—	December 4, 2008	Kitt Peak	Spacewatch	·	830 m	MPC · JPL
792154	2020 WR_{29}	—	October 24, 2003	Kitt Peak	Spacewatch	·	990 m	MPC · JPL
792155	2020 WU_{29}	—	November 23, 2020	Mount Lemmon	Mount Lemmon Survey	·	1.2 km	MPC · JPL
792156	2020 XR	—	December 4, 2020	Haleakala	Pan-STARRS 2	APO · PHA	410 m	MPC · JPL
792157	2020 XU_{7}	—	April 23, 2014	Cerro Tololo	DECam	·	1 km	MPC · JPL
792158	2020 XG_{9}	—	December 11, 2020	Haleakala	Pan-STARRS 2	EUN	740 m	MPC · JPL
792159	2020 XG_{11}	—	February 3, 2016	Haleakala	Pan-STARRS 1	·	2.4 km	MPC · JPL
792160	2020 XA_{12}	—	March 28, 2016	Cerro Tololo	DECam	·	2.3 km	MPC · JPL
792161	2020 XF_{14}	—	October 5, 2003	Kitt Peak	Spacewatch	·	760 m	MPC · JPL
792162	2020 XX_{16}	—	December 11, 2020	Haleakala	Pan-STARRS 1	·	2.1 km	MPC · JPL
792163	2020 XZ_{16}	—	July 8, 2018	Haleakala	Pan-STARRS 1	·	2.7 km	MPC · JPL
792164	2020 XW_{18}	—	March 18, 2016	Mount Lemmon	Mount Lemmon Survey	·	1.4 km	MPC · JPL
792165	2020 XH_{20}	—	January 15, 2008	Mount Lemmon	Mount Lemmon Survey	EUN	720 m	MPC · JPL
792166	2020 XC_{21}	—	December 10, 2020	Haleakala	Pan-STARRS 1	·	1.2 km	MPC · JPL
792167	2020 XJ_{21}	—	December 9, 2020	Kitt Peak	Bok NEO Survey	·	640 m	MPC · JPL
792168	2020 XP_{21}	—	October 20, 2007	Mount Lemmon	Mount Lemmon Survey	·	1.2 km	MPC · JPL
792169	2020 YK_{7}	—	December 24, 2020	Haleakala	Pan-STARRS 1	·	1.2 km	MPC · JPL
792170	2020 YV_{7}	—	December 17, 2020	Haleakala	Pan-STARRS 1	·	1.0 km	MPC · JPL
792171	2020 YQ_{9}	—	January 27, 2017	Haleakala	Pan-STARRS 1	·	900 m	MPC · JPL
792172	2020 YO_{13}	—	February 23, 2007	Kitt Peak	Spacewatch	BRA	1 km	MPC · JPL
792173	2020 YG_{16}	—	March 29, 2017	Haleakala	Pan-STARRS 1	·	1.3 km	MPC · JPL
792174	2020 YS_{16}	—	December 18, 2007	Mount Lemmon	Mount Lemmon Survey	HNS	810 m	MPC · JPL
792175	2020 YW_{16}	—	December 18, 2020	Mount Lemmon	Mount Lemmon Survey	EUN	750 m	MPC · JPL
792176	2020 YS_{19}	—	March 4, 2013	Haleakala	Pan-STARRS 1	(5)	860 m	MPC · JPL
792177	2020 YV_{19}	—	February 10, 2016	Haleakala	Pan-STARRS 1	HYG	1.7 km	MPC · JPL
792178	2020 YS_{20}	—	April 30, 2016	Haleakala	Pan-STARRS 1	·	2.3 km	MPC · JPL
792179	2020 YH_{22}	—	May 21, 2017	Haleakala	Pan-STARRS 1	·	1.0 km	MPC · JPL
792180	2020 YU_{22}	—	December 22, 2020	Mount Lemmon	Mount Lemmon Survey	·	1.8 km	MPC · JPL
792181	2020 YY_{22}	—	December 23, 2020	Haleakala	Pan-STARRS 1	·	1.3 km	MPC · JPL
792182	2020 YY_{24}	—	December 23, 2020	Haleakala	Pan-STARRS 1	HNS	720 m	MPC · JPL
792183	2020 YZ_{24}	—	December 17, 2020	Haleakala	Pan-STARRS 1	·	960 m	MPC · JPL
792184	2020 YJ_{25}	—	October 27, 2019	Haleakala	Pan-STARRS 1	VER	2.0 km	MPC · JPL
792185	2020 YP_{28}	—	December 17, 2020	Haleakala	Pan-STARRS 1	·	850 m	MPC · JPL
792186	2020 YY_{32}	—	December 17, 2020	Haleakala	Pan-STARRS 1	·	1.0 km	MPC · JPL
792187	2021 AG_{10}	—	January 27, 2017	Haleakala	Pan-STARRS 1	·	930 m	MPC · JPL
792188	2021 AU_{12}	—	January 5, 2021	Haleakala	Pan-STARRS 1	·	1.2 km	MPC · JPL
792189	2021 AM_{13}	—	February 21, 2017	Haleakala	Pan-STARRS 1	·	810 m	MPC · JPL
792190	2021 AZ_{18}	—	January 31, 2017	Haleakala	Pan-STARRS 1	·	680 m	MPC · JPL
792191	2021 AV_{19}	—	January 7, 2021	Mount Lemmon	Mount Lemmon Survey	VER	2.2 km	MPC · JPL
792192	2021 AS_{22}	—	January 15, 2021	Haleakala	Pan-STARRS 1	·	1.9 km	MPC · JPL
792193	2021 AZ_{22}	—	January 9, 2021	Mount Lemmon	Mount Lemmon Survey	DOR	1.8 km	MPC · JPL
792194	2021 AV_{23}	—	January 15, 2021	Haleakala	Pan-STARRS 1	JUN	650 m	MPC · JPL
792195	2021 AK_{24}	—	January 11, 2021	Haleakala	Pan-STARRS 1	·	1.3 km	MPC · JPL
792196	2021 AF_{33}	—	January 29, 2009	Mount Lemmon	Mount Lemmon Survey	·	830 m	MPC · JPL
792197	2021 BL_{5}	—	January 27, 2017	Haleakala	Pan-STARRS 1	·	840 m	MPC · JPL
792198	2021 BR_{7}	—	January 24, 2021	Haleakala	Pan-STARRS 1	·	640 m	MPC · JPL
792199	2021 BU_{7}	—	August 31, 2019	Haleakala	Pan-STARRS 1	·	810 m	MPC · JPL
792200	2021 BF_{9}	—	April 7, 2013	Mount Lemmon	Mount Lemmon Survey	·	1.1 km	MPC · JPL

== 792201–792300 ==
back to top

Designation			Discovery			Properties		Ref
Permanent	Provisional	Named after	Date	Site	Discoverer(s)	Category	Diam.	Ref
792201	2021 BL_{9}	—	January 16, 2021	Haleakala	Pan-STARRS 1	·	740 m	MPC · JPL
792202	2021 BN_{10}	—	March 29, 2016	Cerro Tololo-DECam	DECam	(1118)	2.4 km	MPC · JPL
792203	2021 BZ_{10}	—	January 16, 2021	Haleakala	Pan-STARRS 1	(5)	880 m	MPC · JPL
792204	2021 BU_{12}	—	January 16, 2021	Haleakala	Pan-STARRS 1	·	1.3 km	MPC · JPL
792205	2021 CU_{7}	—	November 1, 2019	Palomar	Zwicky Transient Facility	·	1.9 km	MPC · JPL
792206	2021 CB_{11}	—	March 19, 2017	Haleakala	Pan-STARRS 1	EUN	800 m	MPC · JPL
792207	2021 CB_{13}	—	March 10, 2016	Haleakala	Pan-STARRS 1	EOS	1.4 km	MPC · JPL
792208	2021 CH_{13}	—	February 9, 2021	Mount Lemmon	Mount Lemmon Survey	EUN	820 m	MPC · JPL
792209	2021 CD_{14}	—	February 10, 2021	Haleakala	Pan-STARRS 1	·	1.1 km	MPC · JPL
792210	2021 CE_{14}	—	February 16, 2016	Mount Lemmon	Mount Lemmon Survey	·	1.5 km	MPC · JPL
792211	2021 CL_{17}	—	February 7, 2021	Mount Lemmon	Mount Lemmon Survey	EUN	900 m	MPC · JPL
792212	2021 CZ_{17}	—	February 8, 2021	Mount Lemmon	Mount Lemmon Survey	HNS	820 m	MPC · JPL
792213	2021 CS_{18}	—	February 7, 2021	Mount Lemmon	Mount Lemmon Survey	·	2.3 km	MPC · JPL
792214	2021 CH_{19}	—	March 15, 2012	Mount Lemmon	Mount Lemmon Survey	·	1.1 km	MPC · JPL
792215	2021 CJ_{19}	—	February 8, 2021	Mount Lemmon	Mount Lemmon Survey	·	1.1 km	MPC · JPL
792216	2021 CR_{21}	—	February 7, 2021	Haleakala	Pan-STARRS 1	EOS	1.2 km	MPC · JPL
792217	2021 CA_{22}	—	March 8, 2008	Kitt Peak	Spacewatch	·	1.0 km	MPC · JPL
792218	2021 CV_{23}	—	October 24, 2013	Mount Lemmon	Mount Lemmon Survey	·	2.1 km	MPC · JPL
792219	2021 CX_{23}	—	February 7, 2021	Haleakala	Pan-STARRS 1	·	1.0 km	MPC · JPL
792220	2021 CH_{24}	—	February 12, 2021	Haleakala	Pan-STARRS 2	·	1.1 km	MPC · JPL
792221	2021 CV_{24}	—	March 2, 2012	Mount Lemmon	Mount Lemmon Survey	·	1.2 km	MPC · JPL
792222	2021 CY_{24}	—	January 18, 2015	Mount Lemmon	Mount Lemmon Survey	·	1.8 km	MPC · JPL
792223	2021 CB_{27}	—	February 7, 2021	Haleakala	Pan-STARRS 1	HNS	630 m	MPC · JPL
792224	2021 CL_{30}	—	March 29, 2017	Haleakala	Pan-STARRS 1	·	1.1 km	MPC · JPL
792225	2021 CM_{31}	—	September 21, 2001	Kitt Peak	Spacewatch	·	2.5 km	MPC · JPL
792226	2021 CN_{31}	—	June 27, 2014	Haleakala	Pan-STARRS 1	MAR	710 m	MPC · JPL
792227	2021 CR_{31}	—	February 2, 2017	Haleakala	Pan-STARRS 1	EUN	870 m	MPC · JPL
792228	2021 CS_{31}	—	June 2, 2010	WISE	WISE	URS	2.3 km	MPC · JPL
792229	2021 CN_{35}	—	February 12, 2021	Haleakala	Pan-STARRS 1	·	1.2 km	MPC · JPL
792230	2021 CC_{36}	—	February 6, 2021	Mount Lemmon	Mount Lemmon Survey	·	830 m	MPC · JPL
792231	2021 CS_{36}	—	June 9, 2010	WISE	WISE	·	2.4 km	MPC · JPL
792232	2021 CT_{36}	—	February 12, 2021	Haleakala	Pan-STARRS 1	·	680 m	MPC · JPL
792233	2021 CW_{36}	—	January 31, 2009	Mount Lemmon	Mount Lemmon Survey	·	770 m	MPC · JPL
792234	2021 CC_{37}	—	February 8, 2021	Haleakala	Pan-STARRS 1	·	1.3 km	MPC · JPL
792235	2021 CQ_{37}	—	October 25, 2019	Haleakala	Pan-STARRS 1	EUN	700 m	MPC · JPL
792236	2021 CC_{38}	—	January 19, 2008	Mount Lemmon	Mount Lemmon Survey	·	930 m	MPC · JPL
792237	2021 CT_{38}	—	February 12, 2021	Haleakala	Pan-STARRS 1	·	1.3 km	MPC · JPL
792238	2021 CG_{39}	—	January 12, 2016	Kitt Peak	Spacewatch	·	1.3 km	MPC · JPL
792239	2021 CR_{39}	—	February 5, 2021	Mount Lemmon	Mount Lemmon Survey	·	1.3 km	MPC · JPL
792240	2021 CH_{40}	—	January 16, 2015	Haleakala	Pan-STARRS 1	·	2.4 km	MPC · JPL
792241	2021 CN_{40}	—	February 11, 2021	Haleakala	Pan-STARRS 1	·	2.2 km	MPC · JPL
792242	2021 CP_{46}	—	February 7, 2021	Haleakala	Pan-STARRS 1	·	2.5 km	MPC · JPL
792243	2021 CB_{49}	—	November 25, 2014	Mount Lemmon	Mount Lemmon Survey	(18466)	1.9 km	MPC · JPL
792244	2021 CF_{49}	—	February 12, 2021	Haleakala	Pan-STARRS 1	VER	2.0 km	MPC · JPL
792245	2021 CG_{49}	—	February 13, 2021	Kitt Peak	Bok NEO Survey	·	2.4 km	MPC · JPL
792246	2021 CR_{49}	—	February 11, 2021	Haleakala	Pan-STARRS 1	EUN	780 m	MPC · JPL
792247	2021 CZ_{53}	—	September 29, 2014	Haleakala	Pan-STARRS 1	·	1.4 km	MPC · JPL
792248	2021 CN_{58}	—	October 15, 2015	Haleakala	Pan-STARRS 1	·	880 m	MPC · JPL
792249	2021 CU_{61}	—	February 7, 2021	Haleakala	Pan-STARRS 1	·	2.1 km	MPC · JPL
792250	2021 DG_{3}	—	February 17, 2021	Haleakala	Pan-STARRS 2	·	1.2 km	MPC · JPL
792251	2021 DG_{4}	—	February 16, 2021	Haleakala	Pan-STARRS 1	·	890 m	MPC · JPL
792252	2021 DQ_{4}	—	May 27, 2014	Haleakala	Pan-STARRS 1	3:2	3.9 km	MPC · JPL
792253	2021 DA_{5}	—	April 27, 2016	Mount Lemmon	Mount Lemmon Survey	·	1.7 km	MPC · JPL
792254	2021 DN_{5}	—	February 16, 2021	Haleakala	Pan-STARRS 1	·	1.2 km	MPC · JPL
792255	2021 DY_{5}	—	February 22, 2021	Haleakala	Pan-STARRS 1	·	1.5 km	MPC · JPL
792256	2021 DZ_{6}	—	February 16, 2021	Haleakala	Pan-STARRS 1	·	710 m	MPC · JPL
792257	2021 DE_{8}	—	February 16, 2021	Haleakala	Pan-STARRS 1	EUN	700 m	MPC · JPL
792258	2021 DM_{8}	—	October 27, 2013	Haleakala	Pan-STARRS 1	EOS	1.2 km	MPC · JPL
792259	2021 DW_{8}	—	March 27, 2012	Haleakala	Pan-STARRS 1	·	1.3 km	MPC · JPL
792260	2021 DW_{10}	—	September 20, 2014	Haleakala	Pan-STARRS 1	·	900 m	MPC · JPL
792261	2021 DV_{12}	—	December 12, 2020	Kitt Peak	Bok NEO Survey	·	1.2 km	MPC · JPL
792262	2021 DF_{13}	—	February 16, 2021	Haleakala	Pan-STARRS 1	KOR	990 m	MPC · JPL
792263	2021 DJ_{13}	—	February 17, 2021	Haleakala	Pan-STARRS 1	·	1.4 km	MPC · JPL
792264	2021 DK_{14}	—	February 16, 2021	Haleakala	Pan-STARRS 1	·	840 m	MPC · JPL
792265	2021 DQ_{14}	—	February 16, 2021	Haleakala	Pan-STARRS 1	·	2.2 km	MPC · JPL
792266	2021 DS_{14}	—	August 27, 2014	Haleakala	Pan-STARRS 1	·	1.0 km	MPC · JPL
792267	2021 DB_{15}	—	August 7, 2018	Haleakala	Pan-STARRS 1	·	1.5 km	MPC · JPL
792268	2021 DV_{17}	—	February 17, 2021	Haleakala	Pan-STARRS 1	·	1.3 km	MPC · JPL
792269	2021 DU_{19}	—	February 17, 2021	Haleakala	Pan-STARRS 1	·	1.2 km	MPC · JPL
792270	2021 DF_{20}	—	January 22, 2015	Haleakala	Pan-STARRS 1	EOS	1.3 km	MPC · JPL
792271	2021 DL_{21}	—	February 16, 2021	Haleakala	Pan-STARRS 1	WIT	680 m	MPC · JPL
792272	2021 DF_{22}	—	February 16, 2021	Haleakala	Pan-STARRS 1	·	1.1 km	MPC · JPL
792273	2021 EW_{4}	—	March 16, 2004	Kitt Peak	Spacewatch	·	1.0 km	MPC · JPL
792274	2021 EP_{5}	—	March 4, 2017	Haleakala	Pan-STARRS 1	·	970 m	MPC · JPL
792275	2021 EX_{5}	—	November 3, 2015	Mount Lemmon	Mount Lemmon Survey	·	780 m	MPC · JPL
792276	2021 EK_{6}	—	April 14, 2008	Kitt Peak	Spacewatch	·	1.3 km	MPC · JPL
792277	2021 ET_{6}	—	March 15, 2021	Haleakala	Pan-STARRS 1	·	1.4 km	MPC · JPL
792278	2021 EX_{6}	—	February 7, 2008	Kitt Peak	Spacewatch	MAR	780 m	MPC · JPL
792279	2021 EZ_{6}	—	April 25, 2017	Haleakala	Pan-STARRS 1	·	960 m	MPC · JPL
792280	2021 EB_{7}	—	July 14, 2013	Haleakala	Pan-STARRS 1	·	1.3 km	MPC · JPL
792281	2021 EE_{8}	—	January 20, 2012	Mount Lemmon	Mount Lemmon Survey	·	1.2 km	MPC · JPL
792282	2021 EM_{8}	—	March 15, 2021	Haleakala	Pan-STARRS 1	·	950 m	MPC · JPL
792283	2021 EG_{9}	—	May 17, 2017	Haleakala	Pan-STARRS 1	·	1.3 km	MPC · JPL
792284	2021 ED_{10}	—	March 15, 2021	Haleakala	Pan-STARRS 1	·	1.3 km	MPC · JPL
792285	2021 EA_{11}	—	January 28, 2016	Mount Lemmon	Mount Lemmon Survey	·	1.3 km	MPC · JPL
792286	2021 EQ_{12}	—	February 2, 2006	Kitt Peak	Spacewatch	·	1.6 km	MPC · JPL
792287	2021 ED_{15}	—	March 7, 2021	Mount Lemmon	Mount Lemmon Survey	EUN	860 m	MPC · JPL
792288	2021 EH_{15}	—	May 1, 2017	Mount Lemmon	Mount Lemmon Survey	·	1.0 km	MPC · JPL
792289	2021 EL_{16}	—	March 15, 2021	Haleakala	Pan-STARRS 1	·	810 m	MPC · JPL
792290	2021 ET_{16}	—	September 6, 2008	Kitt Peak	Spacewatch	DOR	1.6 km	MPC · JPL
792291	2021 EY_{16}	—	April 2, 2016	Haleakala	Pan-STARRS 1	·	1.6 km	MPC · JPL
792292	2021 EF_{17}	—	July 27, 2017	Haleakala	Pan-STARRS 1	VER	2.1 km	MPC · JPL
792293	2021 EJ_{19}	—	March 15, 2021	Haleakala	Pan-STARRS 1	·	1.9 km	MPC · JPL
792294	2021 EB_{21}	—	February 9, 2008	Kitt Peak	Spacewatch	·	870 m	MPC · JPL
792295	2021 EN_{21}	—	November 8, 2018	Haleakala	Pan-STARRS 2	·	1.9 km	MPC · JPL
792296	2021 ED_{23}	—	March 7, 2021	Mount Lemmon	Mount Lemmon Survey	·	980 m	MPC · JPL
792297	2021 EZ_{23}	—	September 4, 2019	Haleakala	Pan-STARRS 1	·	1.2 km	MPC · JPL
792298	2021 EB_{24}	—	March 6, 2021	Mount Lemmon	Mount Lemmon Survey	BRG	890 m	MPC · JPL
792299	2021 EW_{25}	—	March 28, 2008	Mount Lemmon	Mount Lemmon Survey	MIS	1.6 km	MPC · JPL
792300	2021 EP_{27}	—	October 20, 2007	Kitt Peak	Spacewatch	·	700 m	MPC · JPL

== 792301–792400 ==
back to top

Designation			Discovery			Properties		Ref
Permanent	Provisional	Named after	Date	Site	Discoverer(s)	Category	Diam.	Ref
792301	2021 EZ_{30}	—	April 15, 2008	Mount Lemmon	Mount Lemmon Survey	·	1.2 km	MPC · JPL
792302	2021 ET_{32}	—	March 5, 2006	Kitt Peak	Spacewatch	·	1.2 km	MPC · JPL
792303	2021 EB_{35}	—	March 15, 2021	Haleakala	Pan-STARRS 1	·	850 m	MPC · JPL
792304	2021 EU_{35}	—	February 27, 2004	Kitt Peak	Deep Ecliptic Survey	·	900 m	MPC · JPL
792305	2021 ES_{36}	—	January 14, 2016	Haleakala	Pan-STARRS 1	·	1.3 km	MPC · JPL
792306	2021 EX_{36}	—	August 18, 2018	Haleakala	Pan-STARRS 1	WIT	610 m	MPC · JPL
792307	2021 EH_{37}	—	August 16, 2013	Haleakala	Pan-STARRS 1	·	1.0 km	MPC · JPL
792308	2021 EV_{37}	—	March 7, 2021	Mount Lemmon	Mount Lemmon Survey	·	1.3 km	MPC · JPL
792309	2021 ED_{38}	—	January 20, 2015	Haleakala	Pan-STARRS 1	VER	1.7 km	MPC · JPL
792310	2021 EL_{38}	—	March 7, 2021	Mount Lemmon	Mount Lemmon Survey	·	1.1 km	MPC · JPL
792311	2021 EZ_{38}	—	December 1, 2008	Kitt Peak	Spacewatch	·	1.1 km	MPC · JPL
792312	2021 EA_{39}	—	August 31, 2017	Haleakala	Pan-STARRS 1	·	1.8 km	MPC · JPL
792313	2021 EX_{40}	—	January 17, 2015	Haleakala	Pan-STARRS 1	VER	2.0 km	MPC · JPL
792314	2021 EE_{42}	—	March 15, 2021	Haleakala	Pan-STARRS 1	·	1.4 km	MPC · JPL
792315	2021 EK_{42}	—	April 2, 2016	Haleakala	Pan-STARRS 1	·	1.7 km	MPC · JPL
792316	2021 EY_{42}	—	January 1, 2016	Mount Lemmon	Mount Lemmon Survey	·	1.3 km	MPC · JPL
792317	2021 EC_{43}	—	March 15, 2021	Haleakala	Pan-STARRS 1	·	1.3 km	MPC · JPL
792318	2021 EH_{48}	—	March 15, 2021	Haleakala	Pan-STARRS 1	·	1.4 km	MPC · JPL
792319	2021 EL_{48}	—	January 20, 2015	Mount Lemmon	Mount Lemmon Survey	·	2.5 km	MPC · JPL
792320	2021 EU_{48}	—	May 1, 2016	Cerro Tololo	DECam	ELF	2.3 km	MPC · JPL
792321	2021 EK_{50}	—	May 2, 2013	Kitt Peak	Spacewatch	·	1.1 km	MPC · JPL
792322	2021 EJ_{53}	—	March 22, 2017	Haleakala	Pan-STARRS 1	·	1.1 km	MPC · JPL
792323	2021 EG_{56}	—	October 28, 2014	Mount Lemmon	Mount Lemmon Survey	·	1.3 km	MPC · JPL
792324	2021 ET_{57}	—	March 7, 2021	Mount Lemmon	Mount Lemmon Survey	AGN	810 m	MPC · JPL
792325	2021 FG_{4}	—	October 4, 2013	Mount Lemmon	Mount Lemmon Survey	·	1.5 km	MPC · JPL
792326	2021 FM_{4}	—	March 26, 2008	Mount Lemmon	Mount Lemmon Survey	·	1.2 km	MPC · JPL
792327	2021 FC_{5}	—	January 17, 2016	Haleakala	Pan-STARRS 1	·	1.5 km	MPC · JPL
792328	2021 FG_{5}	—	December 8, 2015	Haleakala	Pan-STARRS 1	·	860 m	MPC · JPL
792329	2021 FE_{6}	—	March 19, 2021	Haleakala	Pan-STARRS 1	·	2.4 km	MPC · JPL
792330	2021 FJ_{7}	—	March 25, 2021	Haleakala	Pan-STARRS 2	·	1.2 km	MPC · JPL
792331	2021 FN_{7}	—	March 25, 2000	Kitt Peak	Spacewatch	·	790 m	MPC · JPL
792332	2021 FY_{7}	—	March 23, 2021	Mount Lemmon	Mount Lemmon Survey	JUN	630 m	MPC · JPL
792333	2021 FW_{8}	—	March 23, 2021	Kitt Peak	Bok NEO Survey	NEM	1.6 km	MPC · JPL
792334	2021 FB_{10}	—	May 21, 2017	Haleakala	Pan-STARRS 1	·	1.0 km	MPC · JPL
792335	2021 FH_{10}	—	January 11, 2016	Haleakala	Pan-STARRS 1	·	1.3 km	MPC · JPL
792336	2021 FB_{12}	—	January 10, 2008	Mount Lemmon	Mount Lemmon Survey	·	790 m	MPC · JPL
792337	2021 FF_{12}	—	January 17, 2015	Haleakala	Pan-STARRS 1	·	2.3 km	MPC · JPL
792338	2021 FP_{12}	—	January 29, 2016	Mount Lemmon	Mount Lemmon Survey	·	1.4 km	MPC · JPL
792339	2021 FS_{12}	—	March 20, 2021	Mount Lemmon	Mount Lemmon Survey	·	1.4 km	MPC · JPL
792340	2021 FM_{13}	—	March 20, 2021	Haleakala	Pan-STARRS 1	·	890 m	MPC · JPL
792341	2021 FU_{13}	—	March 10, 2008	Mount Lemmon	Mount Lemmon Survey	EUN	750 m	MPC · JPL
792342	2021 FA_{14}	—	November 25, 2009	Mount Lemmon	Mount Lemmon Survey	·	1.7 km	MPC · JPL
792343	2021 FJ_{14}	—	February 8, 2016	Mount Lemmon	Mount Lemmon Survey	·	1.2 km	MPC · JPL
792344	2021 FU_{15}	—	March 7, 2008	Mount Lemmon	Mount Lemmon Survey	·	890 m	MPC · JPL
792345	2021 FW_{15}	—	March 19, 2021	Haleakala	Pan-STARRS 1	·	1.4 km	MPC · JPL
792346	2021 FZ_{15}	—	September 10, 2018	Mount Lemmon	Mount Lemmon Survey	·	1.3 km	MPC · JPL
792347	2021 FV_{17}	—	March 20, 2021	Haleakala	Pan-STARRS 1	·	970 m	MPC · JPL
792348	2021 FO_{18}	—	November 14, 2010	Mount Lemmon	Mount Lemmon Survey	·	1.3 km	MPC · JPL
792349	2021 FB_{19}	—	April 1, 2017	Haleakala	Pan-STARRS 1	·	950 m	MPC · JPL
792350	2021 FU_{19}	—	April 20, 2017	Haleakala	Pan-STARRS 1	·	970 m	MPC · JPL
792351	2021 FD_{20}	—	February 8, 2008	Kitt Peak	Spacewatch	·	920 m	MPC · JPL
792352	2021 FB_{21}	—	October 9, 2012	Mount Lemmon	Mount Lemmon Survey	HYG	2.0 km	MPC · JPL
792353	2021 FU_{21}	—	December 31, 2007	Mount Lemmon	Mount Lemmon Survey	JUN	750 m	MPC · JPL
792354	2021 FD_{22}	—	October 1, 2014	Haleakala	Pan-STARRS 1	·	1.4 km	MPC · JPL
792355	2021 FG_{22}	—	March 19, 2021	Mount Lemmon	Mount Lemmon Survey	EUN	950 m	MPC · JPL
792356	2021 FB_{24}	—	January 20, 2016	Mount Lemmon	Mount Lemmon Survey	·	1.5 km	MPC · JPL
792357	2021 FO_{24}	—	February 3, 2016	Mount Lemmon	Mount Lemmon Survey	·	1.6 km	MPC · JPL
792358	2021 FP_{24}	—	January 22, 2012	Haleakala	Pan-STARRS 1	·	1.2 km	MPC · JPL
792359	2021 FF_{25}	—	April 4, 2008	Kitt Peak	Spacewatch	·	1.0 km	MPC · JPL
792360	2021 FM_{25}	—	March 19, 2021	Haleakala	Pan-STARRS 1	·	2.7 km	MPC · JPL
792361	2021 FT_{25}	—	September 15, 2009	Kitt Peak	Spacewatch	·	1.3 km	MPC · JPL
792362	2021 FB_{28}	—	October 27, 2006	Mount Lemmon	Mount Lemmon Survey	·	640 m	MPC · JPL
792363	2021 FL_{28}	—	April 27, 2017	Haleakala	Pan-STARRS 1	·	1.0 km	MPC · JPL
792364	2021 FU_{28}	—	October 17, 2014	Mount Lemmon	Mount Lemmon Survey	·	1.4 km	MPC · JPL
792365	2021 FT_{29}	—	March 20, 2021	Kitt Peak	Bok NEO Survey	·	1.4 km	MPC · JPL
792366	2021 FO_{30}	—	March 20, 2021	Kitt Peak	Bok NEO Survey	·	1.2 km	MPC · JPL
792367	2021 FY_{30}	—	February 8, 2011	Mount Lemmon	Mount Lemmon Survey	·	1.2 km	MPC · JPL
792368	2021 FH_{32}	—	March 19, 2021	Haleakala	Pan-STARRS 1	·	1.3 km	MPC · JPL
792369	2021 FP_{32}	—	April 26, 2017	Haleakala	Pan-STARRS 1	·	1.3 km	MPC · JPL
792370	2021 FO_{33}	—	March 1, 2008	Kitt Peak	Spacewatch	·	1.1 km	MPC · JPL
792371	2021 FF_{34}	—	October 3, 2018	Haleakala	Pan-STARRS 2	·	1.6 km	MPC · JPL
792372	2021 FV_{35}	—	January 16, 2015	Mount Lemmon	Mount Lemmon Survey	·	1.3 km	MPC · JPL
792373	2021 FW_{35}	—	March 19, 2021	Haleakala	Pan-STARRS 1	MAR	730 m	MPC · JPL
792374	2021 FU_{37}	—	March 23, 2021	Mount Lemmon	Mount Lemmon Survey	·	670 m	MPC · JPL
792375	2021 FV_{39}	—	November 7, 2007	Kitt Peak	Spacewatch	·	680 m	MPC · JPL
792376	2021 FX_{39}	—	March 21, 2021	XuYi	PMO NEO Survey Program	·	1.1 km	MPC · JPL
792377	2021 FE_{41}	—	March 20, 2021	Mount Lemmon	Mount Lemmon Survey	·	1.8 km	MPC · JPL
792378	2021 FG_{41}	—	January 31, 2008	Mount Lemmon	Mount Lemmon Survey	BRG	1.1 km	MPC · JPL
792379	2021 FO_{41}	—	February 16, 2021	Haleakala	Pan-STARRS 1	·	2.2 km	MPC · JPL
792380	2021 FP_{41}	—	August 18, 2018	Haleakala	Pan-STARRS 1	·	1.6 km	MPC · JPL
792381	2021 FD_{42}	—	March 22, 2021	Kitt Peak	Bok NEO Survey	·	970 m	MPC · JPL
792382	2021 FC_{43}	—	March 19, 2021	Haleakala	Pan-STARRS 1	EOS	1.5 km	MPC · JPL
792383	2021 FE_{45}	—	March 20, 2021	Haleakala	Pan-STARRS 1	·	1.4 km	MPC · JPL
792384	2021 FC_{49}	—	February 5, 2011	Haleakala	Pan-STARRS 1	·	1.2 km	MPC · JPL
792385	2021 FN_{49}	—	March 20, 2021	Mount Lemmon	Mount Lemmon Survey	·	1.1 km	MPC · JPL
792386	2021 FP_{49}	—	March 19, 2021	Mount Lemmon	Mount Lemmon Survey	·	2.1 km	MPC · JPL
792387	2021 FS_{49}	—	May 1, 2016	Cerro Tololo	DECam	·	1.7 km	MPC · JPL
792388	2021 FC_{50}	—	October 18, 2009	Mount Lemmon	Mount Lemmon Survey	·	1.3 km	MPC · JPL
792389	2021 FK_{50}	—	November 18, 2006	Mount Lemmon	Mount Lemmon Survey	HNS	720 m	MPC · JPL
792390	2021 FL_{50}	—	March 20, 2021	Mount Lemmon	Mount Lemmon Survey	·	1.4 km	MPC · JPL
792391	2021 FC_{52}	—	April 27, 2017	Haleakala	Pan-STARRS 1	·	1.4 km	MPC · JPL
792392	2021 FP_{52}	—	March 23, 2021	Kitt Peak	Bok NEO Survey	·	1.1 km	MPC · JPL
792393	2021 FN_{53}	—	March 11, 2007	Kitt Peak	Spacewatch	DOR	1.7 km	MPC · JPL
792394	2021 FW_{55}	—	March 19, 2021	Mount Lemmon	Mount Lemmon Survey	·	1.6 km	MPC · JPL
792395	2021 FU_{56}	—	March 20, 2021	Kitt Peak	Bok NEO Survey	·	1.2 km	MPC · JPL
792396	2021 FK_{57}	—	March 23, 2021	Kitt Peak	Bok NEO Survey	·	1.2 km	MPC · JPL
792397	2021 FO_{60}	—	January 17, 2016	Haleakala	Pan-STARRS 1	·	890 m	MPC · JPL
792398	2021 GY_{6}	—	April 4, 2021	Mount Lemmon	Mount Lemmon Survey	·	1.0 km	MPC · JPL
792399	2021 GG_{7}	—	February 3, 2012	Haleakala	Pan-STARRS 1	·	1.2 km	MPC · JPL
792400	2021 GG_{9}	—	August 14, 2018	Haleakala	Pan-STARRS 1	·	1.3 km	MPC · JPL

== 792401–792500 ==
back to top

Designation			Discovery			Properties		Ref
Permanent	Provisional	Named after	Date	Site	Discoverer(s)	Category	Diam.	Ref
792401	2021 GK_{9}	—	October 1, 2014	Haleakala	Pan-STARRS 1	·	980 m	MPC · JPL
792402	2021 GE_{14}	—	December 3, 2019	Mount Lemmon	Mount Lemmon Survey	·	970 m	MPC · JPL
792403	2021 GS_{14}	—	April 3, 2021	Haleakala	Pan-STARRS 1	EOS	1.5 km	MPC · JPL
792404	2021 GE_{17}	—	April 8, 2021	Haleakala	Pan-STARRS 1	AGN	790 m	MPC · JPL
792405	2021 GQ_{17}	—	October 22, 2014	Westfield	International Astronomical Search Collaboration	·	1.4 km	MPC · JPL
792406	2021 GO_{18}	—	November 4, 2013	Mount Lemmon	Mount Lemmon Survey	·	1.5 km	MPC · JPL
792407	2021 GH_{19}	—	April 27, 2012	Haleakala	Pan-STARRS 1	AGN	850 m	MPC · JPL
792408	2021 GW_{19}	—	April 3, 2021	Mount Lemmon	Mount Lemmon Survey	KOR	980 m	MPC · JPL
792409	2021 GH_{20}	—	October 27, 2019	Haleakala	Pan-STARRS 1	·	890 m	MPC · JPL
792410	2021 GQ_{20}	—	March 1, 2016	Mount Lemmon	Mount Lemmon Survey	·	1.4 km	MPC · JPL
792411	2021 GH_{21}	—	May 19, 2017	Haleakala	Pan-STARRS 1	·	990 m	MPC · JPL
792412	2021 GC_{22}	—	April 4, 2021	Mount Lemmon	Mount Lemmon Survey	·	2.3 km	MPC · JPL
792413	2021 GD_{23}	—	February 11, 2016	Haleakala	Pan-STARRS 1	·	1.3 km	MPC · JPL
792414	2021 GE_{23}	—	October 22, 2009	Mount Lemmon	Mount Lemmon Survey	·	1.5 km	MPC · JPL
792415	2021 GH_{24}	—	June 20, 2013	Haleakala	Pan-STARRS 1	·	1.1 km	MPC · JPL
792416	2021 GM_{27}	—	November 9, 2018	Haleakala	Pan-STARRS 2	·	1.3 km	MPC · JPL
792417	2021 GL_{31}	—	April 1, 2016	Haleakala	Pan-STARRS 1	KOR	840 m	MPC · JPL
792418	2021 GM_{32}	—	March 7, 2016	Haleakala	Pan-STARRS 1	·	1.2 km	MPC · JPL
792419	2021 GX_{32}	—	May 1, 2012	Mount Lemmon	Mount Lemmon Survey	·	1.5 km	MPC · JPL
792420	2021 GH_{33}	—	January 25, 2020	Mount Lemmon	Mount Lemmon Survey	·	1.4 km	MPC · JPL
792421	2021 GL_{33}	—	December 31, 2008	Kitt Peak	Spacewatch	·	2.1 km	MPC · JPL
792422	2021 GP_{34}	—	June 18, 2013	Haleakala	Pan-STARRS 1	·	1.0 km	MPC · JPL
792423	2021 GA_{35}	—	April 7, 2021	Haleakala	Pan-STARRS 1	·	1.7 km	MPC · JPL
792424	2021 GH_{37}	—	February 9, 2016	Haleakala	Pan-STARRS 1	MRX	820 m	MPC · JPL
792425	2021 GM_{37}	—	October 31, 2014	Mount Lemmon	Mount Lemmon Survey	·	1.1 km	MPC · JPL
792426	2021 GV_{37}	—	February 25, 2015	Haleakala	Pan-STARRS 1	VER	1.8 km	MPC · JPL
792427	2021 GF_{38}	—	December 30, 2019	Haleakala	Pan-STARRS 1	·	1.5 km	MPC · JPL
792428	2021 GC_{39}	—	December 13, 2015	Haleakala	Pan-STARRS 1	·	1.1 km	MPC · JPL
792429	2021 GO_{43}	—	February 11, 2016	Haleakala	Pan-STARRS 1	AGN	840 m	MPC · JPL
792430	2021 GA_{44}	—	October 9, 2007	Mount Lemmon	Mount Lemmon Survey	·	1.7 km	MPC · JPL
792431	2021 GK_{46}	—	April 28, 2012	Mount Lemmon	Mount Lemmon Survey	·	1.5 km	MPC · JPL
792432	2021 GN_{47}	—	April 10, 2021	Haleakala	Pan-STARRS 2	·	1.6 km	MPC · JPL
792433	2021 GT_{47}	—	October 24, 2013	Mount Lemmon	Mount Lemmon Survey	·	1.4 km	MPC · JPL
792434	2021 GJ_{50}	—	April 18, 2012	Mount Lemmon	Mount Lemmon Survey	·	1.2 km	MPC · JPL
792435	2021 GO_{50}	—	April 30, 2016	Haleakala	Pan-STARRS 1	·	1.5 km	MPC · JPL
792436	2021 GS_{52}	—	April 28, 2012	Mount Lemmon	Mount Lemmon Survey	·	1.3 km	MPC · JPL
792437	2021 GT_{55}	—	March 6, 2016	Haleakala	Pan-STARRS 1	EOS	1.3 km	MPC · JPL
792438	2021 GR_{56}	—	June 24, 2017	Haleakala	Pan-STARRS 1	AEO	870 m	MPC · JPL
792439	2021 GS_{56}	—	February 15, 2012	Haleakala	Pan-STARRS 1	·	950 m	MPC · JPL
792440	2021 GW_{56}	—	July 28, 2009	Kitt Peak	Spacewatch	·	1.1 km	MPC · JPL
792441	2021 GH_{57}	—	August 8, 2018	Haleakala	Pan-STARRS 1	·	880 m	MPC · JPL
792442	2021 GM_{57}	—	April 9, 2021	Haleakala	Pan-STARRS 1	·	1.2 km	MPC · JPL
792443	2021 GL_{58}	—	March 20, 2015	Cerro Paranal	Gaia Ground Based Optical Tracking	·	1.9 km	MPC · JPL
792444	2021 GA_{61}	—	April 5, 2021	Mount Lemmon	Mount Lemmon Survey	HNS	740 m	MPC · JPL
792445	2021 GD_{61}	—	September 16, 2017	Haleakala	Pan-STARRS 1	·	2.2 km	MPC · JPL
792446	2021 GE_{63}	—	April 4, 2021	Mount Lemmon	Mount Lemmon Survey	·	1.0 km	MPC · JPL
792447	2021 GV_{64}	—	May 4, 2016	Haleakala	Pan-STARRS 1	·	1.8 km	MPC · JPL
792448	2021 GJ_{65}	—	November 6, 2018	Haleakala	Pan-STARRS 2	·	2.2 km	MPC · JPL
792449	2021 GL_{65}	—	February 27, 2015	Haleakala	Pan-STARRS 1	·	2.1 km	MPC · JPL
792450	2021 GW_{68}	—	April 10, 2021	Haleakala	Pan-STARRS 1	MRX	670 m	MPC · JPL
792451	2021 GP_{70}	—	December 4, 2018	ESA OGS	ESA OGS	·	1.4 km	MPC · JPL
792452	2021 GW_{72}	—	May 27, 2017	Haleakala	Pan-STARRS 1	·	890 m	MPC · JPL
792453	2021 GE_{73}	—	April 9, 2021	Haleakala	Pan-STARRS 1	·	2.4 km	MPC · JPL
792454	2021 GM_{74}	—	September 13, 2017	Haleakala	Pan-STARRS 1	EOS	1.5 km	MPC · JPL
792455	2021 GH_{75}	—	August 28, 2009	Kitt Peak	Spacewatch	·	1.1 km	MPC · JPL
792456	2021 GT_{75}	—	April 10, 2021	Haleakala	Pan-STARRS 1	·	1.2 km	MPC · JPL
792457	2021 GS_{77}	—	October 2, 2013	Mount Lemmon	Mount Lemmon Survey	KOR	1.1 km	MPC · JPL
792458	2021 GL_{78}	—	April 13, 2004	Kitt Peak	Spacewatch	·	930 m	MPC · JPL
792459	2021 GD_{81}	—	October 18, 2018	Mount Lemmon	Mount Lemmon Survey	·	1.4 km	MPC · JPL
792460	2021 GX_{83}	—	May 1, 2016	Cerro Tololo	DECam	KOR	860 m	MPC · JPL
792461	2021 GB_{85}	—	August 1, 2017	Haleakala	Pan-STARRS 1	·	1.5 km	MPC · JPL
792462	2021 GH_{87}	—	September 13, 2017	Haleakala	Pan-STARRS 1	EOS	1.3 km	MPC · JPL
792463	2021 GM_{90}	—	February 1, 2010	WISE	WISE	·	2.2 km	MPC · JPL
792464	2021 GW_{92}	—	April 1, 2017	Haleakala	Pan-STARRS 1	·	1.0 km	MPC · JPL
792465	2021 GE_{94}	—	May 28, 2008	Mount Lemmon	Mount Lemmon Survey	·	1.1 km	MPC · JPL
792466	2021 GC_{99}	—	October 29, 2014	Kitt Peak	Spacewatch	·	1.5 km	MPC · JPL
792467	2021 GG_{102}	—	August 31, 2017	Haleakala	Pan-STARRS 1	·	1.7 km	MPC · JPL
792468	2021 GP_{107}	—	February 7, 2011	Mount Lemmon	Mount Lemmon Survey	AGN	860 m	MPC · JPL
792469	2021 GK_{111}	—	April 9, 2021	Haleakala	Pan-STARRS 1	·	2.1 km	MPC · JPL
792470	2021 GT_{111}	—	April 10, 2021	Haleakala	Pan-STARRS 1	·	1.4 km	MPC · JPL
792471	2021 GT_{113}	—	February 16, 2012	Haleakala	Pan-STARRS 1	·	940 m	MPC · JPL
792472	2021 GB_{114}	—	April 9, 2021	Haleakala	Pan-STARRS 1	BRG	960 m	MPC · JPL
792473	2021 GX_{114}	—	December 3, 2014	Haleakala	Pan-STARRS 1	·	1.5 km	MPC · JPL
792474	2021 GZ_{114}	—	February 5, 2016	Haleakala	Pan-STARRS 1	·	1.0 km	MPC · JPL
792475	2021 GW_{116}	—	April 15, 2021	Haleakala	Pan-STARRS 1	·	2.3 km	MPC · JPL
792476	2021 GN_{117}	—	April 10, 2021	Haleakala	Pan-STARRS 1	·	1.9 km	MPC · JPL
792477	2021 GE_{118}	—	April 7, 2021	Haleakala	Pan-STARRS 1	·	1.7 km	MPC · JPL
792478	2021 GG_{118}	—	April 3, 2021	Haleakala	Pan-STARRS 1	·	750 m	MPC · JPL
792479	2021 GH_{119}	—	April 10, 2021	Haleakala	Pan-STARRS 1	EOS	1.2 km	MPC · JPL
792480	2021 GW_{126}	—	April 6, 2021	Haleakala	Pan-STARRS 1	·	1.9 km	MPC · JPL
792481	2021 GZ_{126}	—	August 3, 2017	Haleakala	Pan-STARRS 1	EOS	1.1 km	MPC · JPL
792482	2021 GM_{130}	—	August 12, 2013	Haleakala	Pan-STARRS 1	·	1.3 km	MPC · JPL
792483	2021 GS_{133}	—	November 21, 2014	Haleakala	Pan-STARRS 1	·	1.5 km	MPC · JPL
792484	2021 GX_{134}	—	April 9, 2021	Haleakala	Pan-STARRS 1	·	2.4 km	MPC · JPL
792485	2021 GD_{135}	—	April 27, 2017	Haleakala	Pan-STARRS 1	·	950 m	MPC · JPL
792486	2021 GO_{153}	—	April 7, 2021	Haleakala	Pan-STARRS 1	·	2.2 km	MPC · JPL
792487	2021 GX_{153}	—	April 6, 2021	Haleakala	Pan-STARRS 1	EOS	1.3 km	MPC · JPL
792488	2021 GT_{155}	—	August 23, 2006	Cerro Tololo	Deep Ecliptic Survey	·	2.0 km	MPC · JPL
792489	2021 GF_{156}	—	October 19, 2012	Haleakala	Pan-STARRS 1	·	2.9 km	MPC · JPL
792490	2021 GU_{157}	—	July 14, 2013	Haleakala	Pan-STARRS 1	HOF	1.7 km	MPC · JPL
792491	2021 GH_{159}	—	April 10, 2021	Haleakala	Pan-STARRS 1	·	2.0 km	MPC · JPL
792492	2021 GR_{159}	—	April 6, 2021	Haleakala	Pan-STARRS 1	EOS	1.2 km	MPC · JPL
792493	2021 GU_{165}	—	April 3, 2021	Mount Lemmon	Mount Lemmon Survey	·	1.3 km	MPC · JPL
792494	2021 GW_{165}	—	April 6, 2021	Haleakala	Pan-STARRS 1	EOS	1.4 km	MPC · JPL
792495	2021 GB_{166}	—	April 10, 2021	Haleakala	Pan-STARRS 1	·	2.5 km	MPC · JPL
792496	2021 GT_{166}	—	April 10, 2021	Haleakala	Pan-STARRS 1	KOR	890 m	MPC · JPL
792497	2021 GB_{171}	—	November 10, 2018	Mount Lemmon	Mount Lemmon Survey	EOS	1.3 km	MPC · JPL
792498	2021 GC_{171}	—	November 1, 2018	Haleakala	Pan-STARRS 2	KOR	990 m	MPC · JPL
792499	2021 GQ_{171}	—	April 14, 2021	Haleakala	Pan-STARRS 1	VER	1.9 km	MPC · JPL
792500	2021 GT_{171}	—	April 10, 2021	Mount Lemmon	Mount Lemmon Survey	·	1.5 km	MPC · JPL

== 792501–792600 ==
back to top

Designation			Discovery			Properties		Ref
Permanent	Provisional	Named after	Date	Site	Discoverer(s)	Category	Diam.	Ref
792501	2021 GN_{172}	—	April 14, 2021	Haleakala	Pan-STARRS 1	·	2.2 km	MPC · JPL
792502	2021 GS_{173}	—	April 9, 2021	Haleakala	Pan-STARRS 1	EOS	1.3 km	MPC · JPL
792503	2021 GM_{175}	—	April 1, 2016	Haleakala	Pan-STARRS 1	·	1.7 km	MPC · JPL
792504	2021 GQ_{175}	—	October 16, 2009	Mount Lemmon	Mount Lemmon Survey	·	1.3 km	MPC · JPL
792505	2021 GG_{179}	—	April 9, 2021	Haleakala	Pan-STARRS 1	VER	1.9 km	MPC · JPL
792506	2021 GZ_{180}	—	April 3, 2021	Mount Lemmon	Mount Lemmon Survey	·	1.6 km	MPC · JPL
792507	2021 GA_{181}	—	April 15, 2021	Haleakala	Pan-STARRS 1	·	1.3 km	MPC · JPL
792508	2021 GQ_{182}	—	April 3, 2021	Haleakala	Pan-STARRS 1	·	1.3 km	MPC · JPL
792509	2021 GU_{195}	—	July 14, 2013	Haleakala	Pan-STARRS 1	·	1.2 km	MPC · JPL
792510	2021 GG_{197}	—	April 7, 2021	Haleakala	Pan-STARRS 1	·	1.8 km	MPC · JPL
792511	2021 GV_{213}	—	April 9, 2021	Haleakala	Pan-STARRS 1	·	1.7 km	MPC · JPL
792512	2021 GA_{215}	—	January 19, 2015	Mount Lemmon	Mount Lemmon Survey	·	1.4 km	MPC · JPL
792513	2021 GK_{215}	—	April 10, 2021	Haleakala	Pan-STARRS 1	AGN	760 m	MPC · JPL
792514	2021 GJ_{216}	—	September 17, 2010	Mount Lemmon	Mount Lemmon Survey	·	900 m	MPC · JPL
792515	2021 GQ_{219}	—	September 16, 2006	Kitt Peak	Spacewatch	·	800 m	MPC · JPL
792516	2021 GR_{219}	—	April 7, 2021	Haleakala	Pan-STARRS 1	·	1.9 km	MPC · JPL
792517	2021 GS_{219}	—	February 29, 2016	Haleakala	Pan-STARRS 1	MRX	710 m	MPC · JPL
792518	2021 GV_{220}	—	April 6, 2021	Haleakala	Pan-STARRS 1	·	1.5 km	MPC · JPL
792519	2021 GW_{220}	—	April 7, 2021	Haleakala	Pan-STARRS 1	KOR	940 m	MPC · JPL
792520	2021 GZ_{229}	—	April 15, 2021	Haleakala	Pan-STARRS 2	·	2.4 km	MPC · JPL
792521	2021 HA_{4}	—	May 4, 2016	Haleakala	Pan-STARRS 1	EOS	1.3 km	MPC · JPL
792522	2021 HZ_{4}	—	July 30, 2017	Haleakala	Pan-STARRS 1	·	1.9 km	MPC · JPL
792523	2021 HD_{7}	—	April 17, 2021	Haleakala	Pan-STARRS 1	·	1.6 km	MPC · JPL
792524	2021 HP_{11}	—	August 30, 2005	Kitt Peak	Spacewatch	·	980 m	MPC · JPL
792525	2021 HC_{13}	—	April 22, 2021	Haleakala	Pan-STARRS 1	·	1.3 km	MPC · JPL
792526	2021 HT_{13}	—	April 18, 2021	Haleakala	Pan-STARRS 1	·	2.2 km	MPC · JPL
792527	2021 HJ_{15}	—	April 22, 2021	Haleakala	Pan-STARRS 1	·	1.3 km	MPC · JPL
792528	2021 HQ_{19}	—	October 18, 2004	Kitt Peak	Deep Ecliptic Survey	·	1.4 km	MPC · JPL
792529	2021 HJ_{22}	—	February 8, 2011	Mount Lemmon	Mount Lemmon Survey	·	1.3 km	MPC · JPL
792530	2021 HD_{25}	—	August 5, 2013	Piszkéstető	K. Sárneczky	·	1.7 km	MPC · JPL
792531	2021 HQ_{29}	—	April 17, 2021	Haleakala	Pan-STARRS 1	EOS	1.2 km	MPC · JPL
792532	2021 HD_{31}	—	April 17, 2021	Haleakala	Pan-STARRS 1	·	1.2 km	MPC · JPL
792533	2021 HO_{31}	—	January 23, 2015	Haleakala	Pan-STARRS 1	EOS	1.3 km	MPC · JPL
792534	2021 HX_{31}	—	April 18, 2015	Cerro Tololo	DECam	·	1.9 km	MPC · JPL
792535	2021 HO_{32}	—	April 16, 2021	Haleakala	Pan-STARRS 1	·	910 m	MPC · JPL
792536	2021 HG_{39}	—	April 17, 2021	Haleakala	Pan-STARRS 1	·	1.6 km	MPC · JPL
792537	2021 HH_{39}	—	April 18, 2021	Haleakala	Pan-STARRS 1	·	1.2 km	MPC · JPL
792538	2021 HM_{39}	—	November 29, 2018	Mount Lemmon	Mount Lemmon Survey	EOS	1.4 km	MPC · JPL
792539	2021 HU_{39}	—	April 17, 2021	Haleakala	Pan-STARRS 1	·	2.0 km	MPC · JPL
792540	2021 JW_{7}	—	December 30, 2019	Kitt Peak	Bok NEO Survey	·	2.3 km	MPC · JPL
792541	2021 JM_{9}	—	October 2, 2006	Kitt Peak	Spacewatch	EOS	1.5 km	MPC · JPL
792542	2021 JC_{10}	—	March 1, 2016	Mount Lemmon	Mount Lemmon Survey	·	1.1 km	MPC · JPL
792543	2021 JG_{10}	—	May 12, 2021	Mount Lemmon	Mount Lemmon Survey	·	1.8 km	MPC · JPL
792544	2021 JE_{14}	—	June 1, 2012	Mount Lemmon	Mount Lemmon Survey	·	1.7 km	MPC · JPL
792545	2021 JO_{14}	—	March 16, 2015	Mount Lemmon	Mount Lemmon Survey	·	1.7 km	MPC · JPL
792546	2021 JA_{15}	—	October 1, 2010	Mount Lemmon	Mount Lemmon Survey	·	950 m	MPC · JPL
792547	2021 JH_{17}	—	May 14, 2021	Mount Lemmon	Mount Lemmon Survey	·	1.0 km	MPC · JPL
792548	2021 JE_{19}	—	May 12, 2021	Mount Lemmon	Mount Lemmon Survey	·	1.2 km	MPC · JPL
792549	2021 JZ_{19}	—	April 18, 2015	Cerro Tololo	DECam	EOS	1.3 km	MPC · JPL
792550	2021 JE_{20}	—	July 26, 2017	Haleakala	Pan-STARRS 1	·	1.3 km	MPC · JPL
792551	2021 JK_{23}	—	July 27, 2017	Haleakala	Pan-STARRS 1	·	1.4 km	MPC · JPL
792552	2021 JN_{29}	—	May 12, 2021	Haleakala	Pan-STARRS 1	·	2.0 km	MPC · JPL
792553	2021 JU_{29}	—	May 10, 2021	Haleakala	Pan-STARRS 1	EOS	1.4 km	MPC · JPL
792554	2021 JX_{29}	—	May 3, 2021	Haleakala	Pan-STARRS 1	·	1.3 km	MPC · JPL
792555	2021 JY_{29}	—	March 23, 2015	Kitt Peak	Wasserman, L. H., M. W. Buie	·	1.6 km	MPC · JPL
792556	2021 JT_{34}	—	September 25, 2017	Haleakala	Pan-STARRS 1	EOS	1.4 km	MPC · JPL
792557	2021 JX_{35}	—	October 24, 2013	Kitt Peak	Spacewatch	GEF	890 m	MPC · JPL
792558	2021 JC_{41}	—	May 8, 2021	Haleakala	Pan-STARRS 1	·	1.9 km	MPC · JPL
792559	2021 JR_{42}	—	May 12, 2021	Mount Lemmon	Mount Lemmon Survey	(21885)	2.2 km	MPC · JPL
792560	2021 JC_{48}	—	May 12, 2021	Haleakala	Pan-STARRS 1	EOS	1.3 km	MPC · JPL
792561	2021 JD_{52}	—	September 14, 2017	Haleakala	Pan-STARRS 1	URS	2.3 km	MPC · JPL
792562	2021 JY_{52}	—	May 12, 2021	Haleakala	Pan-STARRS 1	KOR	1.0 km	MPC · JPL
792563	2021 JH_{53}	—	April 21, 2009	Mount Lemmon	Mount Lemmon Survey	·	2.5 km	MPC · JPL
792564	2021 JC_{57}	—	May 8, 2021	Haleakala	Pan-STARRS 1	·	2.2 km	MPC · JPL
792565	2021 JY_{57}	—	May 14, 2021	Haleakala	Pan-STARRS 1	·	2.0 km	MPC · JPL
792566	2021 JB_{58}	—	October 20, 2012	Haleakala	Pan-STARRS 1	·	2.1 km	MPC · JPL
792567	2021 JE_{59}	—	October 6, 2012	Haleakala	Pan-STARRS 1	·	2.4 km	MPC · JPL
792568	2021 JX_{60}	—	May 3, 2021	Haleakala	Pan-STARRS 1	·	2.2 km	MPC · JPL
792569	2021 JN_{61}	—	April 27, 2012	Haleakala	Pan-STARRS 1	·	1.5 km	MPC · JPL
792570	2021 JO_{61}	—	May 3, 2021	Haleakala	Pan-STARRS 1	·	1.2 km	MPC · JPL
792571	2021 JL_{62}	—	February 20, 2015	Haleakala	Pan-STARRS 1	·	2.0 km	MPC · JPL
792572	2021 JZ_{63}	—	November 17, 2009	Kitt Peak	Spacewatch	·	1.7 km	MPC · JPL
792573	2021 JV_{77}	—	May 12, 2021	Haleakala	Pan-STARRS 1	·	2.0 km	MPC · JPL
792574	2021 JZ_{77}	—	May 10, 2021	Haleakala	Pan-STARRS 1	·	2.0 km	MPC · JPL
792575	2021 KE_{5}	—	January 27, 2015	Haleakala	Pan-STARRS 1	·	1.3 km	MPC · JPL
792576	2021 KK_{6}	—	May 20, 2021	Kitt Peak	Bok NEO Survey	·	2.0 km	MPC · JPL
792577	2021 KD_{12}	—	May 19, 2021	Kitt Peak	Bok NEO Survey	·	1.8 km	MPC · JPL
792578	2021 KB_{13}	—	May 31, 2021	Haleakala	Pan-STARRS 1	·	2.3 km	MPC · JPL
792579	2021 KH_{15}	—	May 18, 2021	Kitt Peak	Spacewatch	L5	6.4 km	MPC · JPL
792580	2021 KL_{16}	—	May 20, 2021	Kitt Peak	Bok NEO Survey	·	2.0 km	MPC · JPL
792581	2021 KP_{16}	—	November 23, 2009	Mount Lemmon	Mount Lemmon Survey	HOF	1.9 km	MPC · JPL
792582	2021 KK_{17}	—	May 31, 2021	Haleakala	Pan-STARRS 1	·	1.4 km	MPC · JPL
792583	2021 KN_{17}	—	October 14, 2012	Kitt Peak	Spacewatch	·	1.9 km	MPC · JPL
792584	2021 KK_{21}	—	May 30, 2021	Haleakala	Pan-STARRS 1	·	1.2 km	MPC · JPL
792585	2021 KN_{21}	—	May 18, 2021	Kitt Peak	Bok NEO Survey	·	2.0 km	MPC · JPL
792586	2021 LB_{4}	—	June 2, 2021	Kitt Peak	Spacewatch	·	1.0 km	MPC · JPL
792587	2021 LM_{9}	—	June 2, 2021	Haleakala	Pan-STARRS 1	EOS	1.4 km	MPC · JPL
792588	2021 LZ_{11}	—	June 2, 2021	Haleakala	Pan-STARRS 1	L5	5.2 km	MPC · JPL
792589	2021 LY_{12}	—	October 17, 2017	Mount Lemmon	Mount Lemmon Survey	·	2.1 km	MPC · JPL
792590	2021 LY_{34}	—	September 18, 2010	Mount Lemmon	Mount Lemmon Survey	EUP	3.3 km	MPC · JPL
792591	2021 LL_{38}	—	October 18, 2012	Haleakala	Pan-STARRS 1	·	1.9 km	MPC · JPL
792592	2021 LC_{40}	—	April 27, 2012	Haleakala	Pan-STARRS 1	·	1.1 km	MPC · JPL
792593	2021 LG_{49}	—	June 7, 2021	Haleakala	Pan-STARRS 1	·	2.5 km	MPC · JPL
792594	2021 LB_{50}	—	January 20, 2015	Haleakala	Pan-STARRS 1	KOR	960 m	MPC · JPL
792595	2021 MD_{4}	—	August 1, 2016	Haleakala	Pan-STARRS 1	·	1.9 km	MPC · JPL
792596	2021 MQ_{8}	—	June 19, 2021	Haleakala	Pan-STARRS 1	·	2.0 km	MPC · JPL
792597	2021 MV_{11}	—	January 28, 2015	Haleakala	Pan-STARRS 1	·	1.6 km	MPC · JPL
792598	2021 MN_{20}	—	July 24, 2017	Haleakala	Pan-STARRS 1	·	1.4 km	MPC · JPL
792599	2021 MT_{20}	—	April 1, 2016	Mount Lemmon	Mount Lemmon Survey	·	1.2 km	MPC · JPL
792600	2021 ME_{21}	—	February 23, 2015	Haleakala	Pan-STARRS 1	·	1.4 km	MPC · JPL

== 792601–792700 ==
back to top

Designation			Discovery			Properties		Ref
Permanent	Provisional	Named after	Date	Site	Discoverer(s)	Category	Diam.	Ref
792601	2021 MO_{25}	—	August 1, 2016	Haleakala	Pan-STARRS 1	·	2.2 km	MPC · JPL
792602	2021 NJ_{7}	—	October 19, 2011	Haleakala	Pan-STARRS 1	EOS	1.5 km	MPC · JPL
792603	2021 NK_{8}	—	January 21, 2014	Mount Lemmon	Mount Lemmon Survey	·	2.4 km	MPC · JPL
792604	2021 NO_{13}	—	December 25, 2017	Haleakala	Pan-STARRS 1	·	1.9 km	MPC · JPL
792605	2021 NP_{17}	—	July 10, 2021	Haleakala	Pan-STARRS 1	·	2.1 km	MPC · JPL
792606	2021 NF_{19}	—	April 27, 2020	Haleakala	Pan-STARRS 1	·	1.9 km	MPC · JPL
792607	2021 NG_{24}	—	April 25, 2014	Cerro Tololo-DECam	DECam	·	2.4 km	MPC · JPL
792608	2021 NL_{41}	—	December 23, 2012	Haleakala	Pan-STARRS 1	·	1.7 km	MPC · JPL
792609	2021 NC_{55}	—	July 4, 2021	Haleakala	Pan-STARRS 1	·	1.1 km	MPC · JPL
792610	2021 ND_{55}	—	July 9, 2021	Haleakala	Pan-STARRS 1	·	940 m	MPC · JPL
792611	2021 NP_{55}	—	November 20, 2015	Mount Lemmon	Mount Lemmon Survey	3:2	3.8 km	MPC · JPL
792612	2021 NB_{59}	—	December 22, 2012	Haleakala	Pan-STARRS 1	·	2.1 km	MPC · JPL
792613	2021 NN_{65}	—	January 28, 2007	Kitt Peak	Spacewatch	·	2.7 km	MPC · JPL
792614	2021 NB_{71}	—	July 13, 2021	Haleakala	Pan-STARRS 1	·	1.5 km	MPC · JPL
792615	2021 OS_{7}	—	August 29, 2016	Mount Lemmon	Mount Lemmon Survey	·	1.9 km	MPC · JPL
792616	2021 OV_{18}	—	May 21, 2014	Haleakala	Pan-STARRS 1	·	2.4 km	MPC · JPL
792617	2021 ON_{25}	—	December 8, 2015	Mount Lemmon	Mount Lemmon Survey	3:2	3.5 km	MPC · JPL
792618	2021 OM_{30}	—	April 5, 2014	Haleakala	Pan-STARRS 1	·	2.1 km	MPC · JPL
792619	2021 OB_{31}	—	July 31, 2021	Haleakala	Pan-STARRS 1	·	1.3 km	MPC · JPL
792620	2021 PS_{10}	—	July 19, 2015	Haleakala	Pan-STARRS 1	·	2.3 km	MPC · JPL
792621	2021 PQ_{19}	—	August 4, 2021	Haleakala	Pan-STARRS 1	·	2.0 km	MPC · JPL
792622	2021 PS_{23}	—	March 9, 2008	Kitt Peak	Spacewatch	·	2.3 km	MPC · JPL
792623	2021 PF_{25}	—	February 16, 2013	Mount Lemmon	Mount Lemmon Survey	VER	1.9 km	MPC · JPL
792624	2021 PW_{67}	—	February 28, 2019	Mount Lemmon	Mount Lemmon Survey	TEL	1.1 km	MPC · JPL
792625	2021 PV_{76}	—	August 14, 2021	Haleakala	Pan-STARRS 1	·	1.5 km	MPC · JPL
792626	2021 PW_{88}	—	October 8, 2005	Kitt Peak	Spacewatch	·	1.8 km	MPC · JPL
792627	2021 PR_{96}	—	August 3, 2021	Haleakala	Pan-STARRS 1	·	2.3 km	MPC · JPL
792628	2021 PU_{129}	—	May 7, 2014	Haleakala	Pan-STARRS 1	·	2.1 km	MPC · JPL
792629	2021 PU_{174}	—	February 9, 2019	Haleakala	Pan-STARRS 1	ARM	2.4 km	MPC · JPL
792630	2021 PM_{209}	—	August 10, 2021	Haleakala	Pan-STARRS 1	·	1.1 km	MPC · JPL
792631	2021 PJ_{212}	—	August 4, 2021	Haleakala	Pan-STARRS 1	·	1.6 km	MPC · JPL
792632	2021 PQ_{217}	—	April 4, 2019	Haleakala	Pan-STARRS 1	·	1.8 km	MPC · JPL
792633	2021 QR_{6}	—	August 16, 2021	Haleakala	Pan-STARRS 1	·	2.0 km	MPC · JPL
792634	2021 QW_{34}	—	May 23, 2014	Haleakala	Pan-STARRS 1	·	2.1 km	MPC · JPL
792635	2021 QR_{40}	—	August 30, 2021	Haleakala	Pan-STARRS 1	·	1.9 km	MPC · JPL
792636	2021 QA_{52}	—	May 23, 2014	Haleakala	Pan-STARRS 1	(1118)	1.9 km	MPC · JPL
792637	2021 QE_{56}	—	January 7, 2006	Mount Lemmon	Mount Lemmon Survey	·	790 m	MPC · JPL
792638	2021 QN_{83}	—	May 24, 2015	Haleakala	Pan-STARRS 1	L4	6.1 km	MPC · JPL
792639	2021 QQ_{96}	—	September 27, 2011	Mount Lemmon	Mount Lemmon Survey	·	1.9 km	MPC · JPL
792640	2021 QT_{114}	—	August 29, 2021	Haleakala	Pan-STARRS 1	·	1.3 km	MPC · JPL
792641	2021 RD_{24}	—	September 9, 2021	Haleakala	Pan-STARRS 2	L4	5.8 km	MPC · JPL
792642	2021 RF_{24}	—	February 10, 2008	Kitt Peak	Spacewatch	·	1.9 km	MPC · JPL
792643	2021 RP_{33}	—	April 18, 2015	Cerro Tololo	DECam	L4	5.8 km	MPC · JPL
792644	2021 RC_{36}	—	October 17, 2010	Mount Lemmon	Mount Lemmon Survey	·	2.7 km	MPC · JPL
792645	2021 RK_{37}	—	May 1, 2016	Cerro Tololo	DECam	L4	5.1 km	MPC · JPL
792646	2021 RD_{45}	—	January 18, 2012	Mount Lemmon	Mount Lemmon Survey	VER	1.9 km	MPC · JPL
792647	2021 RJ_{54}	—	October 6, 2010	Piszkés-tető	K. Sárneczky, Z. Kuli	·	2.1 km	MPC · JPL
792648	2021 RK_{60}	—	September 8, 2021	Haleakala	Pan-STARRS 1	L4	5.7 km	MPC · JPL
792649	2021 RC_{61}	—	November 17, 2011	Kitt Peak	Spacewatch	L4	7.3 km	MPC · JPL
792650	2021 RO_{72}	—	November 3, 2010	Mount Lemmon	Mount Lemmon Survey	L4	5.4 km	MPC · JPL
792651	2021 RB_{74}	—	September 9, 2021	Mount Lemmon	Mount Lemmon Survey	·	1.9 km	MPC · JPL
792652	2021 RE_{75}	—	November 10, 2010	Mount Lemmon	Mount Lemmon Survey	·	2.3 km	MPC · JPL
792653	2021 RL_{81}	—	August 13, 2020	Haleakala	Pan-STARRS 1	L4	5.6 km	MPC · JPL
792654	2021 RU_{96}	—	November 12, 2010	Mount Lemmon	Mount Lemmon Survey	L4	5.4 km	MPC · JPL
792655	2021 RK_{99}	—	September 10, 2021	Haleakala	Pan-STARRS 2	L4	6.1 km	MPC · JPL
792656	2021 RV_{112}	—	June 4, 2003	Kitt Peak	Spacewatch	·	1.1 km	MPC · JPL
792657	2021 RQ_{117}	—	March 16, 2016	Haleakala	Pan-STARRS 1	L4	7.3 km	MPC · JPL
792658	2021 RZ_{121}	—	April 18, 2015	Cerro Tololo	DECam	L4	5.1 km	MPC · JPL
792659	2021 RZ_{123}	—	August 15, 2020	Haleakala	Pan-STARRS 1	L4 · ERY	6.0 km	MPC · JPL
792660	2021 RD_{129}	—	April 21, 2015	Cerro Tololo	DECam	L4	5.9 km	MPC · JPL
792661	2021 RU_{140}	—	September 15, 2021	Haleakala	Pan-STARRS 2	L4	6.2 km	MPC · JPL
792662	2021 RX_{141}	—	April 30, 2016	Haleakala	Pan-STARRS 1	L4	6.4 km	MPC · JPL
792663	2021 RN_{146}	—	July 16, 2004	Cerro Tololo	Deep Ecliptic Survey	THM	1.7 km	MPC · JPL
792664	2021 RC_{178}	—	February 23, 2018	Mount Lemmon	Mount Lemmon Survey	·	2.1 km	MPC · JPL
792665	2021 RW_{185}	—	September 11, 2021	Haleakala	Pan-STARRS 2	L4	5.1 km	MPC · JPL
792666	2021 RK_{200}	—	September 9, 2021	Haleakala	Pan-STARRS 2	L4	5.5 km	MPC · JPL
792667	2021 RH_{206}	—	December 24, 2017	Haleakala	Pan-STARRS 1	·	1.7 km	MPC · JPL
792668	2021 RZ_{206}	—	September 11, 2021	Haleakala	Pan-STARRS 2	L4	5.2 km	MPC · JPL
792669	2021 RE_{207}	—	September 10, 2021	Haleakala	Pan-STARRS 1	L4	6.1 km	MPC · JPL
792670	2021 SC_{18}	—	October 30, 2010	Mount Lemmon	Mount Lemmon Survey	LIX	2.3 km	MPC · JPL
792671	2021 SY_{21}	—	February 28, 2014	Haleakala	Pan-STARRS 1	L4	6.3 km	MPC · JPL
792672	2021 SZ_{23}	—	April 10, 2015	Mount Lemmon	Mount Lemmon Survey	L4	4.9 km	MPC · JPL
792673	2021 SA_{24}	—	September 13, 2020	Haleakala	Pan-STARRS 2	L4	5.3 km	MPC · JPL
792674	2021 SB_{24}	—	May 1, 2016	Cerro Tololo	DECam	L4	5.2 km	MPC · JPL
792675	2021 SR_{32}	—	April 18, 2015	Cerro Tololo	DECam	L4 · ERY	5.6 km	MPC · JPL
792676	2021 SS_{33}	—	April 9, 2015	Mount Lemmon	Mount Lemmon Survey	L4	5.9 km	MPC · JPL
792677	2021 SU_{33}	—	February 16, 2013	Mount Lemmon	Mount Lemmon Survey	L4	5.1 km	MPC · JPL
792678	2021 SP_{36}	—	December 1, 2010	Mount Lemmon	Mount Lemmon Survey	L4	5.7 km	MPC · JPL
792679	2021 SB_{39}	—	September 28, 2021	Haleakala	Pan-STARRS 2	L4	5.7 km	MPC · JPL
792680	2021 SC_{39}	—	September 30, 2021	Haleakala	Pan-STARRS 1	L4	6.8 km	MPC · JPL
792681	2021 SJ_{39}	—	April 18, 2015	Cerro Tololo	DECam	L4	5.6 km	MPC · JPL
792682	2021 SX_{58}	—	August 28, 2019	Haleakala	Pan-STARRS 1	L4	6.3 km	MPC · JPL
792683	2021 TO_{19}	—	November 1, 2008	Mount Lemmon	Mount Lemmon Survey	·	1.1 km	MPC · JPL
792684	2021 TV_{20}	—	April 18, 2015	Cerro Tololo	DECam	L4	5.7 km	MPC · JPL
792685	2021 TQ_{27}	—	April 18, 2015	Cerro Tololo	DECam	L4	4.9 km	MPC · JPL
792686	2021 TU_{31}	—	October 2, 2021	Haleakala	Pan-STARRS 2	·	1.4 km	MPC · JPL
792687	2021 TS_{45}	—	October 4, 2021	Haleakala	Pan-STARRS 2	L4	5.3 km	MPC · JPL
792688	2021 TW_{50}	—	October 2, 2021	Haleakala	Pan-STARRS 2	L4	6.6 km	MPC · JPL
792689	2021 TL_{51}	—	August 29, 2019	Haleakala	Pan-STARRS 1	L4	5.0 km	MPC · JPL
792690	2021 TY_{52}	—	April 18, 2015	Cerro Tololo	DECam	L4	5.8 km	MPC · JPL
792691	2021 TH_{61}	—	July 26, 2015	Haleakala	Pan-STARRS 1	·	2.2 km	MPC · JPL
792692	2021 TP_{61}	—	October 8, 2012	Haleakala	Pan-STARRS 1	·	1.1 km	MPC · JPL
792693	2021 TE_{66}	—	April 18, 2015	Cerro Tololo	DECam	·	930 m	MPC · JPL
792694	2021 TU_{74}	—	April 18, 2015	Cerro Tololo	DECam	L4	5.6 km	MPC · JPL
792695	2021 TJ_{75}	—	March 20, 2015	Haleakala	Pan-STARRS 1	L4	6.4 km	MPC · JPL
792696	2021 TB_{80}	—	January 1, 2012	Mount Lemmon	Mount Lemmon Survey	L4	5.6 km	MPC · JPL
792697	2021 TP_{80}	—	August 10, 2007	Kitt Peak	Spacewatch	·	1.3 km	MPC · JPL
792698	2021 TN_{84}	—	March 20, 2012	Haleakala	Pan-STARRS 1	·	2.1 km	MPC · JPL
792699	2021 TX_{84}	—	September 30, 2010	Mount Lemmon	Mount Lemmon Survey	·	1.6 km	MPC · JPL
792700	2021 TO_{92}	—	October 22, 2009	Mount Lemmon	Mount Lemmon Survey	L4	6.0 km	MPC · JPL

== 792701–792800 ==
back to top

Designation			Discovery			Properties		Ref
Permanent	Provisional	Named after	Date	Site	Discoverer(s)	Category	Diam.	Ref
792701	2021 TA_{94}	—	April 28, 2017	Cerro Tololo-DECam	DECam	L4	6.2 km	MPC · JPL
792702	2021 TX_{101}	—	October 3, 2021	Haleakala	Pan-STARRS 1	L4 · ERY	5.8 km	MPC · JPL
792703	2021 TT_{105}	—	April 19, 2015	Cerro Tololo	DECam	L4	4.9 km	MPC · JPL
792704	2021 TZ_{105}	—	October 14, 2021	Haleakala	Pan-STARRS 1	·	2.4 km	MPC · JPL
792705	2021 TX_{106}	—	November 3, 2010	Kitt Peak	Spacewatch	L4	5.5 km	MPC · JPL
792706	2021 TC_{142}	—	October 3, 2021	Haleakala	Pan-STARRS 2	L4	4.9 km	MPC · JPL
792707	2021 TR_{142}	—	April 18, 2015	Cerro Tololo	DECam	L4	6.1 km	MPC · JPL
792708	2021 TE_{155}	—	August 13, 2015	Kitt Peak	Spacewatch	·	2.1 km	MPC · JPL
792709	2021 TK_{167}	—	October 2, 2021	Haleakala	Pan-STARRS 2	L4	5.9 km	MPC · JPL
792710	2021 TO_{193}	—	November 6, 2010	Kitt Peak	Spacewatch	L4	5.4 km	MPC · JPL
792711	2021 UW_{9}	—	December 22, 2012	Haleakala	Pan-STARRS 1	L4	7.6 km	MPC · JPL
792712	2021 UO_{12}	—	February 16, 2013	Mount Lemmon	Mount Lemmon Survey	L4	5.8 km	MPC · JPL
792713	2021 UA_{24}	—	November 3, 2010	Mount Lemmon	Mount Lemmon Survey	L4	5.7 km	MPC · JPL
792714	2021 UJ_{29}	—	October 28, 2021	Mount Lemmon	Mount Lemmon Survey	L4	6.2 km	MPC · JPL
792715	2021 UY_{50}	—	October 27, 2021	Kitt Peak	Bok NEO Survey	L4	5.7 km	MPC · JPL
792716	2021 UJ_{56}	—	April 23, 2015	Haleakala	Pan-STARRS 1	L4	6.2 km	MPC · JPL
792717	2021 UQ_{63}	—	May 21, 2015	Haleakala	Pan-STARRS 1	L4	6.0 km	MPC · JPL
792718	2021 UH_{106}	—	October 29, 2021	Haleakala	Pan-STARRS 1	L4	6.1 km	MPC · JPL
792719	2021 UK_{107}	—	October 26, 2021	Haleakala	Pan-STARRS 1	L4	6.2 km	MPC · JPL
792720	2021 UB_{122}	—	October 31, 2021	Haleakala	Pan-STARRS 1	L4	6.1 km	MPC · JPL
792721	2021 UC_{122}	—	March 5, 2014	Kitt Peak	Spacewatch	L4	6.0 km	MPC · JPL
792722	2021 VB_{6}	—	January 27, 2012	Mount Lemmon	Mount Lemmon Survey	L4	6.0 km	MPC · JPL
792723	2021 VL_{10}	—	November 6, 2021	Haleakala	Pan-STARRS 2	L4	6.9 km	MPC · JPL
792724	2021 VC_{11}	—	September 23, 2008	Kitt Peak	Spacewatch	L4	5.6 km	MPC · JPL
792725	2021 VF_{15}	—	November 8, 2009	Mount Lemmon	Mount Lemmon Survey	L4	5.6 km	MPC · JPL
792726	2021 VK_{20}	—	August 5, 2018	Haleakala	Pan-STARRS 1	L4	5.9 km	MPC · JPL
792727	2021 VF_{35}	—	November 6, 2021	Mount Lemmon	Mount Lemmon Survey	L4	7.4 km	MPC · JPL
792728	2021 VG_{42}	—	December 27, 2011	Kitt Peak	Spacewatch	L4	6.0 km	MPC · JPL
792729	2021 VP_{64}	—	November 1, 2021	Haleakala	Pan-STARRS 1	L4	6.0 km	MPC · JPL
792730	2021 VN_{74}	—	November 1, 2021	Haleakala	Pan-STARRS 2	KOR	920 m	MPC · JPL
792731	2021 VB_{80}	—	November 7, 2021	Mount Lemmon	Mount Lemmon Survey	L4	5.0 km	MPC · JPL
792732	2021 VW_{96}	—	November 6, 2021	Mount Lemmon	Mount Lemmon Survey	L4	5.9 km	MPC · JPL
792733	2021 VA_{97}	—	November 8, 2021	Mount Lemmon	Mount Lemmon Survey	L4	5.5 km	MPC · JPL
792734	2021 XS_{8}	—	December 2, 2021	Kitt Peak	Bok NEO Survey	EOS	1.2 km	MPC · JPL
792735	2022 AK_{10}	—	October 1, 2008	Mount Lemmon	Mount Lemmon Survey	·	690 m	MPC · JPL
792736	2022 AW_{13}	—	September 12, 2015	Haleakala	Pan-STARRS 1	·	1.3 km	MPC · JPL
792737	2022 AO_{14}	—	November 23, 2016	Mount Lemmon	Mount Lemmon Survey	AGN	810 m	MPC · JPL
792738	2022 AJ_{18}	—	April 1, 2013	Mount Lemmon	Mount Lemmon Survey	KOR	1.0 km	MPC · JPL
792739	2022 AP_{28}	—	January 9, 2022	Haleakala	Pan-STARRS 2	EUN	790 m	MPC · JPL
792740	2022 AL_{29}	—	December 8, 2012	Mount Lemmon	Mount Lemmon Survey	·	1.0 km	MPC · JPL
792741	2022 AT_{32}	—	January 22, 2018	Mount Lemmon	Mount Lemmon Survey	·	1.2 km	MPC · JPL
792742	2022 BH_{13}	—	February 7, 2011	Mount Lemmon	Mount Lemmon Survey	·	2.3 km	MPC · JPL
792743	2022 BP_{35}	—	February 24, 2017	Haleakala	Pan-STARRS 1	·	1.6 km	MPC · JPL
792744	2022 BX_{35}	—	July 10, 2019	Haleakala	Pan-STARRS 1	HOF	1.8 km	MPC · JPL
792745	2022 BJ_{57}	—	January 30, 2022	Haleakala	Pan-STARRS 2	·	1.9 km	MPC · JPL
792746	2022 CY_{12}	—	December 17, 2020	Mount Lemmon	Mount Lemmon Survey	EUN	1.1 km	MPC · JPL
792747	2022 CR_{20}	—	February 9, 2022	Haleakala	Pan-STARRS 2	·	2.0 km	MPC · JPL
792748	2022 CA_{28}	—	February 5, 2022	Haleakala	Pan-STARRS 2	·	1.2 km	MPC · JPL
792749	2022 CB_{43}	—	February 5, 2022	Mount Lemmon	Mount Lemmon Survey	·	2.1 km	MPC · JPL
792750	2022 DR_{9}	—	October 9, 2015	Haleakala	Pan-STARRS 1	AGN	880 m	MPC · JPL
792751	2022 DF_{12}	—	March 15, 2007	Mount Lemmon	Mount Lemmon Survey	·	1.5 km	MPC · JPL
792752	2022 DJ_{18}	—	February 28, 2022	Haleakala	Pan-STARRS 2	·	2.2 km	MPC · JPL
792753	2022 DC_{25}	—	November 11, 2020	Mount Lemmon	Mount Lemmon Survey	·	930 m	MPC · JPL
792754	2022 DV_{31}	—	February 25, 2022	Haleakala	Pan-STARRS 2	·	1.2 km	MPC · JPL
792755	2022 DO_{32}	—	February 24, 2022	Haleakala	Pan-STARRS 2	·	1.3 km	MPC · JPL
792756	2022 DD_{33}	—	February 26, 2014	Haleakala	Pan-STARRS 1	·	730 m	MPC · JPL
792757	2022 EC_{8}	—	August 15, 2013	Haleakala	Pan-STARRS 1	EOS	1.3 km	MPC · JPL
792758	2022 EP_{9}	—	January 4, 2016	Haleakala	Pan-STARRS 1	·	1.7 km	MPC · JPL
792759	2022 EB_{13}	—	March 1, 2022	Haleakala	Pan-STARRS 2	·	1.0 km	MPC · JPL
792760	2022 EE_{14}	—	October 10, 2015	Haleakala	Pan-STARRS 1	·	1.3 km	MPC · JPL
792761	2022 FH_{5}	—	July 13, 2013	Haleakala	Pan-STARRS 1	·	1.5 km	MPC · JPL
792762	2022 FH_{6}	—	March 31, 2022	Haleakala	Pan-STARRS 2	·	1.9 km	MPC · JPL
792763	2022 FX_{6}	—	March 27, 2022	Haleakala	Pan-STARRS 2	3:2 · SHU	4.4 km	MPC · JPL
792764	2022 FE_{11}	—	January 26, 2017	Haleakala	Pan-STARRS 1	·	1.2 km	MPC · JPL
792765	2022 FC_{18}	—	March 25, 2022	Kitt Peak	Bok NEO Survey	·	1.3 km	MPC · JPL
792766	2022 GG_{6}	—	July 26, 2017	Haleakala	Pan-STARRS 1	LIX	2.7 km	MPC · JPL
792767	2022 GN_{9}	—	May 1, 2006	Kitt Peak	Spacewatch	TIR	2.1 km	MPC · JPL
792768	2022 GU_{15}	—	April 8, 2022	Haleakala	Pan-STARRS 2	·	2.6 km	MPC · JPL
792769	2022 GQ_{21}	—	April 6, 2022	Mount Lemmon	Mount Lemmon Survey	·	930 m	MPC · JPL
792770	2022 GH_{22}	—	April 12, 2022	Haleakala	Pan-STARRS 2	·	1.4 km	MPC · JPL
792771	2022 GU_{22}	—	April 3, 2022	Haleakala	Pan-STARRS 2	·	2.5 km	MPC · JPL
792772	2022 GO_{25}	—	January 18, 2015	Mount Lemmon	Mount Lemmon Survey	·	2.4 km	MPC · JPL
792773	2022 GU_{25}	—	February 11, 2016	Haleakala	Pan-STARRS 1	·	1.7 km	MPC · JPL
792774	2022 HY_{5}	—	January 11, 2016	Haleakala	Pan-STARRS 1	·	1.6 km	MPC · JPL
792775	2022 HB_{6}	—	June 24, 2017	Haleakala	Pan-STARRS 1	·	1.7 km	MPC · JPL
792776	2022 HM_{9}	—	September 7, 2018	Mount Lemmon	Mount Lemmon Survey	·	1.6 km	MPC · JPL
792777	2022 HF_{10}	—	April 26, 2022	Haleakala	Pan-STARRS 2	·	2.1 km	MPC · JPL
792778	2022 HF_{12}	—	April 23, 2022	Haleakala	Pan-STARRS 2	·	1.6 km	MPC · JPL
792779	2022 HK_{17}	—	April 27, 2022	Haleakala	Pan-STARRS 2	·	1.4 km	MPC · JPL
792780	2022 HM_{21}	—	April 28, 2022	Haleakala	Pan-STARRS 2	·	2.3 km	MPC · JPL
792781	2022 HL_{22}	—	April 27, 2022	Haleakala	Pan-STARRS 2	THM	1.7 km	MPC · JPL
792782	2022 JX_{8}	—	May 9, 2022	Haleakala	Pan-STARRS 2	·	2.2 km	MPC · JPL
792783	2022 JR_{9}	—	February 3, 2013	Haleakala	Pan-STARRS 1	EUN	810 m	MPC · JPL
792784	2022 JT_{12}	—	May 9, 2022	Haleakala	Pan-STARRS 2	·	1.2 km	MPC · JPL
792785	2022 KM_{8}	—	May 1, 2011	Haleakala	Pan-STARRS 1	EOS	1.5 km	MPC · JPL
792786	2022 KG_{10}	—	October 11, 2007	Mount Lemmon	Mount Lemmon Survey	EOS	1.3 km	MPC · JPL
792787	2022 KZ_{22}	—	May 22, 2022	Haleakala	Pan-STARRS 2	·	1.5 km	MPC · JPL
792788	2022 KQ_{25}	—	May 31, 2022	Haleakala	Pan-STARRS 2	·	950 m	MPC · JPL
792789	2022 KG_{29}	—	May 29, 2022	Mount Lemmon	Mount Lemmon Survey	·	2.1 km	MPC · JPL
792790	2022 KA_{32}	—	November 27, 2013	Haleakala	Pan-STARRS 1	THM	1.9 km	MPC · JPL
792791	2022 KB_{33}	—	December 6, 2019	Mount Lemmon	Mount Lemmon Survey	·	1.7 km	MPC · JPL
792792	2022 KC_{33}	—	May 21, 2022	Haleakala	Pan-STARRS 2	EOS	1.2 km	MPC · JPL
792793	2022 KR_{33}	—	May 21, 2022	Haleakala	Pan-STARRS 2	·	1.2 km	MPC · JPL
792794	2022 KS_{34}	—	May 30, 2022	Mount Lemmon	Mount Lemmon Survey	·	2.5 km	MPC · JPL
792795	2022 KK_{39}	—	September 29, 2011	Mount Lemmon	Mount Lemmon Survey	·	1.1 km	MPC · JPL
792796	2022 KD_{42}	—	October 26, 2011	Zelenchukskaya	T. V. Krjačko, B. Satovski	·	3.5 km	MPC · JPL
792797	2022 LM_{4}	—	January 21, 2020	Haleakala	Pan-STARRS 1	·	1.5 km	MPC · JPL
792798	2022 LS_{5}	—	June 2, 2022	Haleakala	Pan-STARRS 2	L5	6.4 km	MPC · JPL
792799	2022 LD_{9}	—	June 2, 2022	Haleakala	Pan-STARRS 2	·	1.3 km	MPC · JPL
792800	2022 LQ_{17}	—	October 26, 2019	Mount Lemmon	Mount Lemmon Survey	·	780 m	MPC · JPL

== 792801–792900 ==
back to top

Designation			Discovery			Properties		Ref
Permanent	Provisional	Named after	Date	Site	Discoverer(s)	Category	Diam.	Ref
792801	2022 LF_{19}	—	June 4, 2022	Haleakala	Pan-STARRS 2	·	1.3 km	MPC · JPL
792802	2022 LJ_{20}	—	June 2, 2022	Haleakala	Pan-STARRS 2	TRE	1.4 km	MPC · JPL
792803	2022 LF_{21}	—	December 20, 2019	Mount Lemmon	Mount Lemmon Survey	·	2.0 km	MPC · JPL
792804	2022 MC_{1}	—	June 20, 2022	Haleakala	Pan-STARRS 2	·	1.4 km	MPC · JPL
792805	2022 MG_{13}	—	June 24, 2022	Haleakala	Pan-STARRS 2	·	2.2 km	MPC · JPL
792806	2022 ML_{14}	—	June 28, 2022	Cerro Tololo-DECam	DECam	MAR	700 m	MPC · JPL
792807	2022 NJ_{2}	—	September 30, 2017	Mount Lemmon	Mount Lemmon Survey	URS	2.5 km	MPC · JPL
792808	2022 NV_{5}	—	January 23, 2020	Haleakala	Pan-STARRS 2	·	2.3 km	MPC · JPL
792809	2022 NM_{9}	—	September 30, 2017	Mount Lemmon	Mount Lemmon Survey	ELF	2.2 km	MPC · JPL
792810	2022 NN_{16}	—	July 5, 2022	Haleakala	Pan-STARRS 2	·	2.0 km	MPC · JPL
792811	2022 NY_{16}	—	July 5, 2022	Haleakala	Pan-STARRS 2	NAE	1.4 km	MPC · JPL
792812	2022 OW_{15}	—	July 28, 2022	Haleakala	Pan-STARRS 2	L5	6.4 km	MPC · JPL
792813	2022 OY_{15}	—	July 28, 2022	Haleakala	Pan-STARRS 2	·	2.3 km	MPC · JPL
792814	2022 OF_{16}	—	July 26, 2022	Haleakala	Pan-STARRS 2	·	1.6 km	MPC · JPL
792815	2022 OH_{16}	—	July 30, 2022	Haleakala	Pan-STARRS 2	·	1.9 km	MPC · JPL
792816	2022 OJ_{17}	—	July 25, 2022	Haleakala	Pan-STARRS 2	·	1.1 km	MPC · JPL
792817	2022 OD_{19}	—	July 23, 2022	Haleakala	Pan-STARRS 2	·	2.7 km	MPC · JPL
792818	2022 OP_{26}	—	August 8, 2013	Kitt Peak	Spacewatch	·	1.4 km	MPC · JPL
792819	2022 OT_{27}	—	July 28, 2022	Haleakala	Pan-STARRS 2	·	2.2 km	MPC · JPL
792820	2022 OV_{27}	—	July 25, 2022	Haleakala	Pan-STARRS 2	·	1.1 km	MPC · JPL
792821	2022 OB_{30}	—	May 12, 2021	Haleakala	Pan-STARRS 1	·	1.2 km	MPC · JPL
792822	2022 OJ_{31}	—	August 18, 2017	Haleakala	Pan-STARRS 1	·	1.4 km	MPC · JPL
792823	2022 OB_{32}	—	July 23, 2022	Haleakala	Pan-STARRS 2	·	1.9 km	MPC · JPL
792824	2022 OY_{33}	—	June 7, 2016	Haleakala	Pan-STARRS 1	T_{j} (2.96)	3.2 km	MPC · JPL
792825	2022 ON_{38}	—	July 27, 2022	Haleakala	Pan-STARRS 2	·	2.3 km	MPC · JPL
792826	2022 OM_{39}	—	July 25, 2022	Haleakala	Pan-STARRS 2	·	2.0 km	MPC · JPL
792827	2022 OS_{52}	—	July 29, 2022	Haleakala	Pan-STARRS 2	·	2.0 km	MPC · JPL
792828	2022 OY_{58}	—	December 30, 2019	Haleakala	Pan-STARRS 1	·	1.4 km	MPC · JPL
792829	2022 OQ_{64}	—	October 3, 2015	Mount Lemmon	Mount Lemmon Survey	T_{j} (2.99) · 3:2	4.2 km	MPC · JPL
792830	2022 OV_{64}	—	July 28, 2022	Haleakala	Pan-STARRS 2	URS	2.3 km	MPC · JPL
792831	2022 OT_{73}	—	July 25, 2022	Haleakala	Pan-STARRS 2	EOS	1.3 km	MPC · JPL
792832	2022 OP_{74}	—	July 26, 2022	Haleakala	Pan-STARRS 2	·	1.8 km	MPC · JPL
792833	2022 OU_{74}	—	July 26, 2022	Haleakala	Pan-STARRS 2	VER	1.7 km	MPC · JPL
792834	2022 OC_{75}	—	July 26, 2022	Haleakala	Pan-STARRS 2	·	1.2 km	MPC · JPL
792835	2022 OH_{75}	—	November 1, 2018	Mount Lemmon	Mount Lemmon Survey	·	1.3 km	MPC · JPL
792836	2022 OB_{76}	—	November 16, 2014	Mount Lemmon	Mount Lemmon Survey	AGN	810 m	MPC · JPL
792837	2022 OO_{85}	—	July 28, 2022	Haleakala	Pan-STARRS 2	·	2.7 km	MPC · JPL
792838	2022 PQ_{4}	—	April 18, 2015	Cerro Tololo	DECam	·	1.9 km	MPC · JPL
792839	2022 PL_{6}	—	October 21, 2012	Haleakala	Pan-STARRS 1	·	2.0 km	MPC · JPL
792840	2022 PO_{7}	—	April 23, 2015	Haleakala	Pan-STARRS 1	EOS	1.2 km	MPC · JPL
792841	2022 PE_{11}	—	January 2, 2009	Kitt Peak	Spacewatch	·	1.4 km	MPC · JPL
792842	2022 PT_{13}	—	May 6, 2017	Haleakala	Pan-STARRS 1	·	1.7 km	MPC · JPL
792843	2022 PJ_{14}	—	August 2, 2022	Haleakala	Pan-STARRS 2	·	2.4 km	MPC · JPL
792844	2022 PG_{16}	—	March 12, 2010	Kitt Peak	Spacewatch	·	2.2 km	MPC · JPL
792845	2022 PZ_{22}	—	August 5, 2022	Cerro Tololo-DECam	DECam	(31811)	2.0 km	MPC · JPL
792846	2022 PF_{40}	—	July 26, 2017	Haleakala	Pan-STARRS 1	·	1.4 km	MPC · JPL
792847	2022 PU_{40}	—	August 5, 2022	Haleakala	Pan-STARRS 2	·	2.2 km	MPC · JPL
792848	2022 PY_{40}	—	October 25, 2001	Apache Point	SDSS	·	2.1 km	MPC · JPL
792849	2022 PZ_{40}	—	August 1, 2022	Haleakala	Pan-STARRS 2	EOS	1.1 km	MPC · JPL
792850	2022 QY_{11}	—	October 13, 2017	Mount Lemmon	Mount Lemmon Survey	VER	1.9 km	MPC · JPL
792851	2022 QC_{14}	—	August 19, 2022	Haleakala	Pan-STARRS 2	EOS	1.3 km	MPC · JPL
792852	2022 QN_{14}	—	April 18, 2015	Cerro Tololo	DECam	·	1.8 km	MPC · JPL
792853	2022 QK_{15}	—	October 8, 2012	Haleakala	Pan-STARRS 1	EOS	1.3 km	MPC · JPL
792854	2022 QT_{15}	—	November 28, 2013	Mount Lemmon	Mount Lemmon Survey	·	1.9 km	MPC · JPL
792855	2022 QP_{17}	—	July 25, 2017	Haleakala	Pan-STARRS 1	·	1.2 km	MPC · JPL
792856	2022 QU_{20}	—	February 5, 2016	Haleakala	Pan-STARRS 1	(12739)	1.3 km	MPC · JPL
792857	2022 QJ_{31}	—	August 18, 2022	Haleakala	Pan-STARRS 1	KOR	1.0 km	MPC · JPL
792858	2022 QB_{34}	—	August 29, 2009	Kitt Peak	Spacewatch	·	1.3 km	MPC · JPL
792859	2022 QW_{35}	—	August 29, 2022	Haleakala	Pan-STARRS 1	·	3.1 km	MPC · JPL
792860	2022 QC_{38}	—	July 31, 2000	Cerro Tololo	Deep Ecliptic Survey	THM	1.3 km	MPC · JPL
792861	2022 QK_{44}	—	February 16, 2015	Haleakala	Pan-STARRS 1	·	1.7 km	MPC · JPL
792862	2022 QO_{46}	—	August 20, 2022	Haleakala	Pan-STARRS 1	·	1.8 km	MPC · JPL
792863	2022 QV_{47}	—	January 9, 2014	Mount Lemmon	Mount Lemmon Survey	·	1.9 km	MPC · JPL
792864	2022 QX_{53}	—	July 12, 2013	Haleakala	Pan-STARRS 1	·	1.1 km	MPC · JPL
792865	2022 QW_{61}	—	October 31, 2008	Kitt Peak	Spacewatch	·	1.9 km	MPC · JPL
792866	2022 QV_{64}	—	August 19, 2022	Haleakala	Pan-STARRS 2	·	2.0 km	MPC · JPL
792867	2022 QL_{67}	—	May 5, 2016	Haleakala	Pan-STARRS 1	·	1.3 km	MPC · JPL
792868	2022 QM_{67}	—	August 17, 2022	Haleakala	Pan-STARRS 2	·	2.1 km	MPC · JPL
792869	2022 QP_{72}	—	January 11, 2014	Kitt Peak	Spacewatch	EOS	1.4 km	MPC · JPL
792870	2022 QU_{78}	—	August 19, 2022	Haleakala	Pan-STARRS 1	·	1.8 km	MPC · JPL
792871	2022 QE_{83}	—	January 12, 2008	Mount Lemmon	Mount Lemmon Survey	EUN	1.1 km	MPC · JPL
792872	2022 QH_{87}	—	August 19, 2022	Haleakala	Pan-STARRS 2	EOS	1.4 km	MPC · JPL
792873	2022 QG_{89}	—	August 26, 2022	Haleakala	Pan-STARRS 1	·	1.8 km	MPC · JPL
792874	2022 QG_{92}	—	November 6, 2010	Mount Lemmon	Mount Lemmon Survey	·	3.0 km	MPC · JPL
792875	2022 QR_{95}	—	August 29, 2022	Haleakala	Pan-STARRS 2	·	1.7 km	MPC · JPL
792876	2022 QY_{95}	—	August 25, 2022	Haleakala	Pan-STARRS 2	·	1.9 km	MPC · JPL
792877	2022 QS_{111}	—	April 19, 2020	Haleakala	Pan-STARRS 1	·	1.8 km	MPC · JPL
792878	2022 QM_{160}	—	December 10, 2015	Mount Lemmon	Mount Lemmon Survey	EUN	880 m	MPC · JPL
792879	2022 QA_{164}	—	August 25, 2022	Haleakala	Pan-STARRS 1	·	2.3 km	MPC · JPL
792880	2022 QU_{175}	—	October 15, 2017	Mount Lemmon	Mount Lemmon Survey	·	1.5 km	MPC · JPL
792881	2022 QR_{184}	—	May 14, 2021	Cerro Tololo-DECam	DECam	·	1.4 km	MPC · JPL
792882	2022 QO_{201}	—	September 28, 2000	Kitt Peak	Spacewatch	·	2.0 km	MPC · JPL
792883	2022 QU_{214}	—	August 19, 2022	Haleakala	Pan-STARRS 2	·	1.8 km	MPC · JPL
792884	2022 QU_{264}	—	August 28, 2022	Haleakala	Pan-STARRS 2	·	2.0 km	MPC · JPL
792885	2022 QZ_{264}	—	August 18, 2022	Haleakala	Pan-STARRS 2	·	2.0 km	MPC · JPL
792886	2022 QK_{265}	—	August 18, 2022	Haleakala	Pan-STARRS 2	EOS	1.3 km	MPC · JPL
792887	2022 RZ_{6}	—	October 2, 2013	Mount Lemmon	Mount Lemmon Survey	HOF	2.0 km	MPC · JPL
792888	2022 RB_{10}	—	September 2, 2022	Haleakala	Pan-STARRS 2	·	1.7 km	MPC · JPL
792889	2022 RD_{12}	—	January 16, 2013	Mount Lemmon	Mount Lemmon Survey	·	2.3 km	MPC · JPL
792890	2022 RC_{42}	—	January 22, 2015	Haleakala	Pan-STARRS 1	TEL	950 m	MPC · JPL
792891	2022 RP_{52}	—	September 1, 2022	Haleakala	Pan-STARRS 1	·	2.1 km	MPC · JPL
792892	2022 RU_{75}	—	July 29, 2000	Cerro Tololo	Deep Ecliptic Survey	·	1.7 km	MPC · JPL
792893	2022 SL_{17}	—	January 6, 2003	Kitt Peak	Deep Lens Survey	·	2.0 km	MPC · JPL
792894	2022 SN_{22}	—	March 21, 2015	Haleakala	Pan-STARRS 1	·	1.4 km	MPC · JPL
792895	2022 SZ_{25}	—	September 23, 2006	Kitt Peak	Spacewatch	·	1.1 km	MPC · JPL
792896	2022 SP_{35}	—	October 26, 2011	Haleakala	Pan-STARRS 1	·	1.7 km	MPC · JPL
792897	2022 SZ_{51}	—	April 3, 2016	Haleakala	Pan-STARRS 1	·	1.3 km	MPC · JPL
792898	2022 SP_{58}	—	August 8, 2016	Haleakala	Pan-STARRS 1	·	2.2 km	MPC · JPL
792899	2022 SV_{60}	—	July 13, 2016	Haleakala	Pan-STARRS 1	·	1.8 km	MPC · JPL
792900	2022 SX_{71}	—	September 2, 2013	Mount Lemmon	Mount Lemmon Survey	·	1.0 km	MPC · JPL

== 792901–793000 ==
back to top

Designation			Discovery			Properties		Ref
Permanent	Provisional	Named after	Date	Site	Discoverer(s)	Category	Diam.	Ref
792901	2022 SK_{72}	—	January 23, 2015	Haleakala	Pan-STARRS 1	·	1.5 km	MPC · JPL
792902	2022 SU_{74}	—	October 10, 2016	Haleakala	Pan-STARRS 1	·	3.1 km	MPC · JPL
792903	2022 SJ_{78}	—	October 23, 2011	Haleakala	Pan-STARRS 1	·	2.0 km	MPC · JPL
792904	2022 SU_{79}	—	February 10, 2015	Mount Lemmon	Mount Lemmon Survey	·	1.2 km	MPC · JPL
792905	2022 SD_{85}	—	September 23, 2011	Haleakala	Pan-STARRS 1	·	2.3 km	MPC · JPL
792906	2022 SE_{104}	—	September 14, 2007	Mount Lemmon	Mount Lemmon Survey	·	1.2 km	MPC · JPL
792907	2022 SX_{120}	—	September 27, 2022	Kitt Peak	Bok NEO Survey	·	2.1 km	MPC · JPL
792908	2022 SL_{127}	—	April 16, 2020	Mount Lemmon	Mount Lemmon Survey	·	2.0 km	MPC · JPL
792909	2022 SY_{236}	—	April 5, 2014	Haleakala	Pan-STARRS 1	EUP	2.3 km	MPC · JPL
792910	2022 SG_{242}	—	October 16, 2018	Haleakala	Pan-STARRS 2	·	1.0 km	MPC · JPL
792911	2022 SB_{246}	—	January 29, 2020	Mount Lemmon	Mount Lemmon Survey	·	2.3 km	MPC · JPL
792912	2022 SJ_{269}	—	February 26, 2014	Haleakala	Pan-STARRS 1	·	1.6 km	MPC · JPL
792913	2022 TT_{6}	—	October 1, 2022	Haleakala	Pan-STARRS 2	·	1.4 km	MPC · JPL
792914	2022 TB_{16}	—	April 2, 2019	Haleakala	Pan-STARRS 1	·	2.0 km	MPC · JPL
792915	2022 TF_{17}	—	March 19, 2009	Mount Lemmon	Mount Lemmon Survey	·	1.3 km	MPC · JPL
792916	2022 TF_{20}	—	September 25, 2022	Mount Lemmon	Mount Lemmon Survey	·	1.6 km	MPC · JPL
792917	2022 TS_{21}	—	September 14, 2013	Haleakala	Pan-STARRS 1	WIT	680 m	MPC · JPL
792918	2022 UO_{32}	—	October 28, 2010	Mount Lemmon	Mount Lemmon Survey	L4	5.1 km	MPC · JPL
792919	2022 UP_{33}	—	March 6, 2019	Mount Lemmon	Mount Lemmon Survey	·	3.0 km	MPC · JPL
792920	2022 UG_{53}	—	November 9, 2013	Haleakala	Pan-STARRS 1	·	1.1 km	MPC · JPL
792921	2022 UY_{66}	—	July 13, 2016	Mount Lemmon	Mount Lemmon Survey	EOS	1.5 km	MPC · JPL
792922	2022 UH_{75}	—	November 1, 2010	Mount Lemmon	Mount Lemmon Survey	L4	5.4 km	MPC · JPL
792923	2022 UO_{88}	—	November 1, 2006	Kitt Peak	Spacewatch	·	1.5 km	MPC · JPL
792924	2022 UQ_{90}	—	April 18, 2015	Cerro Tololo	DECam	L4	5.7 km	MPC · JPL
792925	2022 US_{107}	—	January 17, 2013	Haleakala	Pan-STARRS 1	·	1.4 km	MPC · JPL
792926	2022 WZ_{16}	—	December 6, 2005	Kitt Peak	Spacewatch	·	3.2 km	MPC · JPL
792927	2022 WD_{27}	—	November 16, 2022	Haleakala	Pan-STARRS 2	L4	5.0 km	MPC · JPL
792928	2023 BC_{14}	—	September 13, 2004	Kitt Peak	Spacewatch	·	1.5 km	MPC · JPL
792929	2023 FG_{29}	—	January 23, 2011	Mount Lemmon	Mount Lemmon Survey	VER	2.2 km	MPC · JPL
792930	2023 FY_{36}	—	February 26, 2014	Haleakala	Pan-STARRS 1	·	1.2 km	MPC · JPL
792931	2023 FA_{54}	—	May 2, 2019	Haleakala	Pan-STARRS 1	·	1.2 km	MPC · JPL
792932	2023 FF_{58}	—	March 26, 2023	Haleakala	Pan-STARRS 2	·	1.6 km	MPC · JPL
792933	2023 HW_{8}	—	April 17, 2023	Haleakala	Pan-STARRS 2	VER	2.0 km	MPC · JPL
792934	2023 HA_{10}	—	April 19, 2023	Mount Lemmon	Mount Lemmon Survey	·	1.7 km	MPC · JPL
792935	2023 HQ_{18}	—	November 18, 2008	Kitt Peak	Spacewatch	THM	2.0 km	MPC · JPL
792936	2023 HQ_{22}	—	June 8, 2018	Haleakala	Pan-STARRS 1	·	1.4 km	MPC · JPL
792937	2023 HL_{28}	—	March 18, 2010	Mount Lemmon	Mount Lemmon Survey	·	890 m	MPC · JPL
792938	2023 HY_{37}	—	April 16, 2023	Haleakala	Pan-STARRS 2	·	2.1 km	MPC · JPL
792939	2023 JW_{8}	—	May 12, 2023	Haleakala	Pan-STARRS 2	MAR	580 m	MPC · JPL
792940	2023 JX_{20}	—	November 23, 2020	Mount Lemmon	Mount Lemmon Survey	·	1.2 km	MPC · JPL
792941	2023 JU_{25}	—	November 11, 2007	Mount Lemmon	Mount Lemmon Survey	·	1.5 km	MPC · JPL
792942	2023 KG_{6}	—	August 14, 2015	Haleakala	Pan-STARRS 1	·	1.0 km	MPC · JPL
792943	2023 LP_{3}	—	June 15, 2012	Mount Lemmon	Mount Lemmon Survey	T_{j} (2.96)	3.0 km	MPC · JPL
792944	2023 MJ_{6}	—	May 25, 2011	Mount Lemmon	Mount Lemmon Survey	·	2.4 km	MPC · JPL
792945	2023 MA_{7}	—	April 27, 2011	Mount Lemmon	Mount Lemmon Survey	·	2.3 km	MPC · JPL
792946	2023 MB_{7}	—	September 12, 2007	Mount Lemmon	Mount Lemmon Survey	·	2.1 km	MPC · JPL
792947	2023 MB_{9}	—	November 23, 2014	Mount Lemmon	Mount Lemmon Survey	L5	7.0 km	MPC · JPL
792948	2023 ML_{15}	—	June 24, 2023	Mount Lemmon	Mount Lemmon Survey	TIN	720 m	MPC · JPL
792949	2023 MK_{20}	—	June 16, 2023	Haleakala	Pan-STARRS 1	·	2.5 km	MPC · JPL
792950	2023 NU_{6}	—	November 21, 2014	Mount Lemmon	Mount Lemmon Survey	L5	6.8 km	MPC · JPL
792951	2023 OT_{2}	—	July 16, 2023	Haleakala	Pan-STARRS 1	·	1.8 km	MPC · JPL
792952	2023 OM_{8}	—	August 13, 2012	Kitt Peak	Spacewatch	L5	6.4 km	MPC · JPL
792953	2023 OU_{8}	—	April 24, 2022	Mount Lemmon	Mount Lemmon Survey	·	1.9 km	MPC · JPL
792954	2023 OB_{9}	—	November 27, 2013	Haleakala	Pan-STARRS 1	·	2.1 km	MPC · JPL
792955	2023 OY_{9}	—	September 6, 2008	Mount Lemmon	Mount Lemmon Survey	·	1.3 km	MPC · JPL
792956	2023 OB_{11}	—	July 26, 2023	Haleakala	Pan-STARRS 1	TIR	2.2 km	MPC · JPL
792957	2023 OZ_{20}	—	July 28, 2011	Haleakala	Pan-STARRS 1	L5	6.2 km	MPC · JPL
792958	2023 OP_{21}	—	July 23, 2023	Haleakala	Pan-STARRS 1	L5	5.9 km	MPC · JPL
792959	2023 OH_{22}	—	July 25, 2023	Haleakala	Pan-STARRS 1	L5	6.4 km	MPC · JPL
792960	2023 OZ_{27}	—	December 28, 2014	Mount Lemmon	Mount Lemmon Survey	·	1.3 km	MPC · JPL
792961	2023 OX_{29}	—	July 28, 2023	Haleakala	Pan-STARRS 2	·	1.3 km	MPC · JPL
792962	2023 OA_{35}	—	November 25, 2005	Mount Lemmon	Mount Lemmon Survey	·	1.4 km	MPC · JPL
792963	2023 OY_{45}	—	November 26, 2014	Haleakala	Pan-STARRS 1	·	1.4 km	MPC · JPL
792964	2023 OZ_{50}	—	July 22, 2023	Haleakala	Pan-STARRS 1	T_{j} (2.98)	1.7 km	MPC · JPL
792965	2023 ON_{51}	—	June 28, 2021	Haleakala	Pan-STARRS 1	L5	5.6 km	MPC · JPL
792966	2023 PY_{1}	—	August 5, 2023	Haleakala	Pan-STARRS 1	EOS	1.2 km	MPC · JPL
792967	2023 QX_{8}	—	August 19, 2023	Haleakala	Pan-STARRS 1	L5	6.0 km	MPC · JPL
792968	2023 QG_{9}	—	October 28, 2014	Haleakala	Pan-STARRS 1	·	1.5 km	MPC · JPL
792969	2023 QS_{10}	—	August 22, 2023	Haleakala	Pan-STARRS 1	·	1.4 km	MPC · JPL
792970	2023 QB_{11}	—	August 18, 2023	Haleakala	Pan-STARRS 1	·	2.1 km	MPC · JPL
792971	2023 QS_{13}	—	April 13, 2015	Haleakala	Pan-STARRS 1	·	2.4 km	MPC · JPL
792972 Teresina	2023 QY_{16}	Teresina	December 10, 2014	Mount Lemmon	Mount Lemmon Survey	·	1.4 km	MPC · JPL
792973	2023 QR_{18}	—	October 15, 2012	Catalina	CSS	THB	1.8 km	MPC · JPL
792974	2023 QG_{23}	—	August 20, 2023	Haleakala	Pan-STARRS 1	KOR	890 m	MPC · JPL
792975	2023 QK_{25}	—	August 27, 2023	Haleakala	Pan-STARRS 1	KOR	1.0 km	MPC · JPL
792976	2023 QN_{29}	—	December 30, 2014	Mount Lemmon	Mount Lemmon Survey	TRE	1.6 km	MPC · JPL
792977	2023 QY_{47}	—	August 20, 2023	Haleakala	Pan-STARRS 1	·	1.3 km	MPC · JPL
792978	2023 QG_{48}	—	April 27, 2020	Haleakala	Pan-STARRS 1	L5	5.4 km	MPC · JPL
792979	2023 QP_{64}	—	February 3, 2009	Mount Lemmon	Mount Lemmon Survey	·	2.2 km	MPC · JPL
792980	2023 QC_{80}	—	August 21, 2023	Haleakala	Pan-STARRS 1	·	1.3 km	MPC · JPL
792981	2023 RA_{9}	—	September 8, 2023	Haleakala	Pan-STARRS 1	L5	6.6 km	MPC · JPL
792982	2023 RJ_{15}	—	September 4, 2023	Haleakala	Pan-STARRS 2	·	2.6 km	MPC · JPL
792983	2023 RF_{21}	—	April 21, 2015	Cerro Tololo	DECam	VER	1.6 km	MPC · JPL
792984	2023 RG_{21}	—	September 28, 2019	Mount Lemmon	Mount Lemmon Survey	·	820 m	MPC · JPL
792985	2023 RM_{26}	—	October 10, 2007	Kitt Peak	Spacewatch	·	1.8 km	MPC · JPL
792986	2023 RD_{28}	—	September 7, 2023	Haleakala	Pan-STARRS 1	·	2.4 km	MPC · JPL
792987	2023 RS_{32}	—	November 21, 2003	Kitt Peak	Deep Ecliptic Survey	·	1.8 km	MPC · JPL
792988	2023 RM_{38}	—	September 11, 2023	Haleakala	Pan-STARRS 2	·	1.8 km	MPC · JPL
792989	2023 RZ_{43}	—	September 10, 2023	Haleakala	Pan-STARRS 2	·	2.2 km	MPC · JPL
792990	2023 RB_{44}	—	September 15, 2023	Mount Lemmon	Mount Lemmon Survey	·	1.9 km	MPC · JPL
792991	2023 RD_{44}	—	January 23, 2020	Haleakala	Pan-STARRS 1	EOS	1.3 km	MPC · JPL
792992	2023 RX_{49}	—	November 1, 2018	Mount Lemmon	Mount Lemmon Survey	·	1.4 km	MPC · JPL
792993	2023 RR_{51}	—	September 8, 2023	Haleakala	Pan-STARRS 2	(7605)	2.3 km	MPC · JPL
792994	2023 RU_{53}	—	September 7, 2023	Haleakala	Pan-STARRS 2	·	1.7 km	MPC · JPL
792995	2023 RA_{61}	—	September 11, 2023	Haleakala	Pan-STARRS 2	·	2.3 km	MPC · JPL
792996	2023 RF_{61}	—	September 12, 2023	Haleakala	Pan-STARRS 2	·	1.4 km	MPC · JPL
792997	2023 RO_{65}	—	January 12, 2010	Kitt Peak	Spacewatch	EOS	1.5 km	MPC · JPL
792998	2023 RZ_{67}	—	May 26, 2006	Mount Lemmon	Mount Lemmon Survey	·	2.0 km	MPC · JPL
792999	2023 RG_{75}	—	October 10, 2012	Mount Lemmon	Mount Lemmon Survey	·	2.0 km	MPC · JPL
793000	2023 RP_{75}	—	April 18, 2015	Cerro Tololo	DECam	VER	1.9 km	MPC · JPL

back to top

== Meaning of names ==
As minor planet discoveries are confirmed, they are given a permanent number by the IAU's Minor Planet Center (MPC), and the discoverers can then submit names for them, following the IAU's naming conventions. The list below concerns those minor planets in the specified number-range that have received names, and explains the meanings of those names.

Official naming citations of newly named small Solar System bodies are approved and published in a bulletin by IAU's Working Group for Small Bodies Nomenclature (WGSBN). Before May 2021, citations were published in MPC's Minor Planet Circulars for many decades. Recent citations can also be found on the JPL Small-Body Database (SBDB). Until his death in 2016, German astronomer Lutz D. Schmadel compiled these citations into the Dictionary of Minor Planet Names (DMP) and regularly updated the collection.

Based on Paul Herget's The Names of the Minor Planets, Schmadel also researched the unclear origin of numerous asteroids, most of which had been named prior to World War II. This article incorporates text from this source, which is in the public domain: SBDB New namings may only be added to this list below after official publication as the preannouncement of names is condemned. The WGSBN publishes a comprehensive guideline for the naming rules of non-cometary small Solar System bodies.

Named minor planet	Provisional	This minor planet was named for...	Ref · Catalog
792121 Boldea	2020 UX_{49}	Costin Boldea, Romanian associate reader of informatics of the University of Craiova.	IAU · 792121
792972 Teresina	2023 QY_{16}	Teresina, capital of the Brazilian state of Piauí.	IAU · 792972
