= Bok Telescope =

Telescope operated by the Steward Observatory in Pima County, Arizona

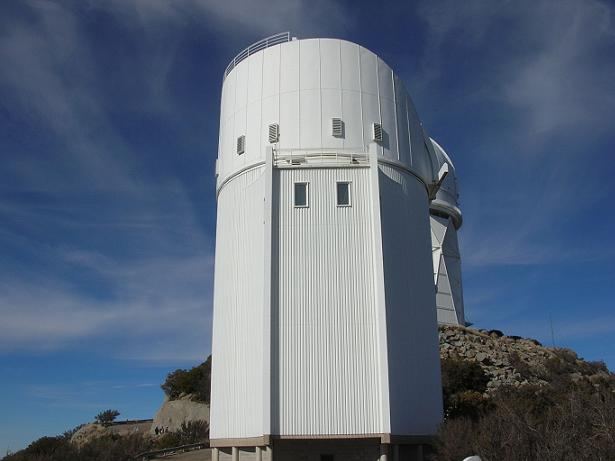
- Alternative names: the 90-inch
- Location: Arizona
- Coordinates: 31°57′46″N 111°36′00″W
- Altitude: 6,900 ft (2,100 m)
- Diameter: 2.3 m (7 ft 7 in)
- Location within the United States
- Related media on Commons

The Bok Telescope (also known as the 90-inch) is the largest telescope operated solely by Steward Observatory. It finds much use from astronomers from the University of Arizona, Arizona State University, and Northern Arizona University, with instruments capable of both imaging and spectroscopy. The telescope operates year-round, except during the August summer-shutdown when maintenance is performed while the weather is poor (Arizona's monsoon season lasts from roughly July through August).

== History ==
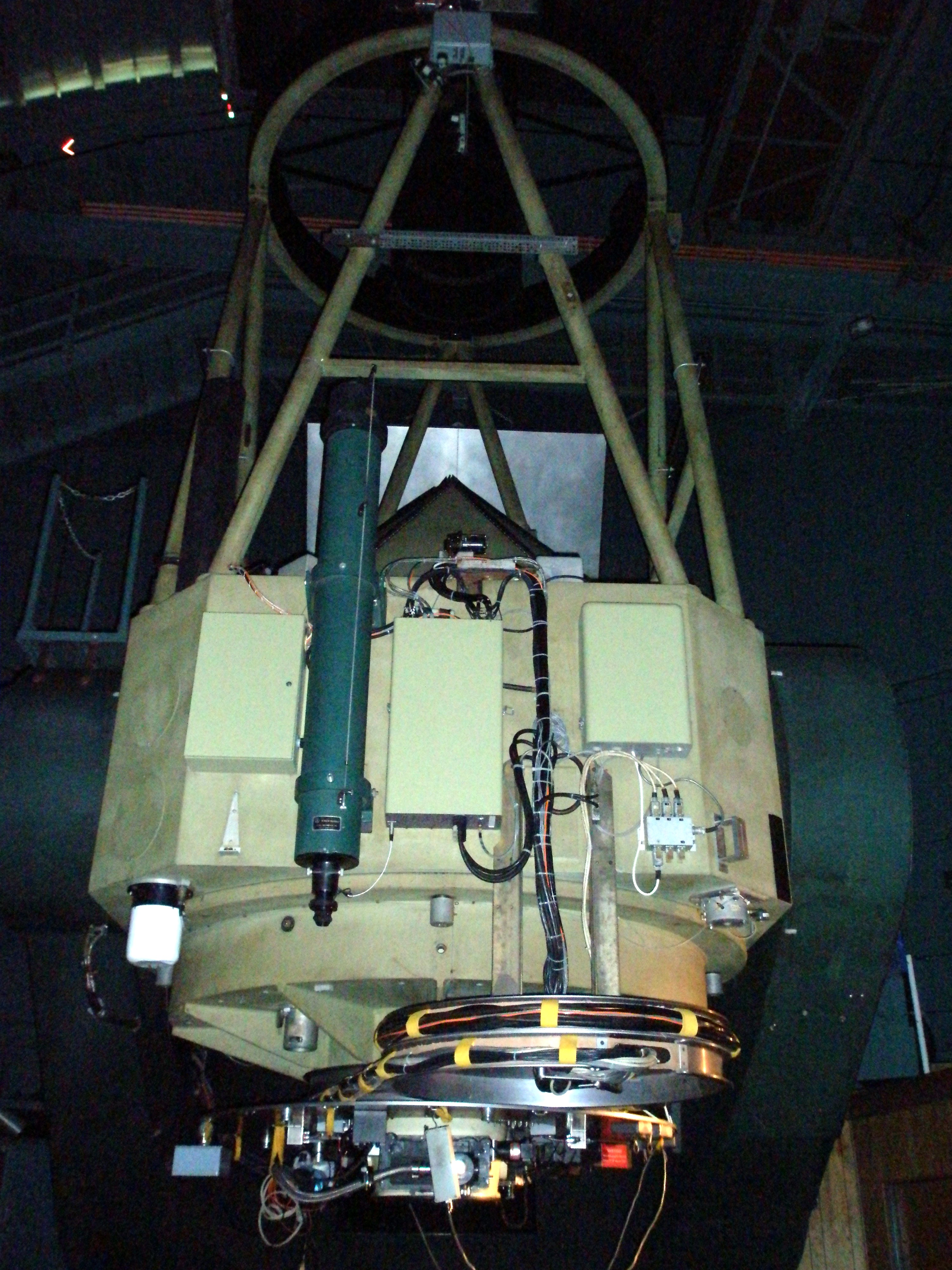
The telescope

The Bok Telescope was named after the prolific astronomer and director of Steward Observatory from 1966–1969, Bart Bok, one of the most beloved astronomers in Tucson. It was used on March 18, 2007 by Bruno Sicardy to view Pluto's occultation of a star in Sagittarius. The building itself features a very long spiral staircase leading to the telescope and a balcony called "The Bok Walk".

In the 2010s the Bok telescope helped support a survey with KNPO telescopes in preparation for the DESI instrument on the 4-m Mayall telescope. The Bok telescope was used along with the 90 Prime imager to take g-band and r-band observations.

== Instruments ==
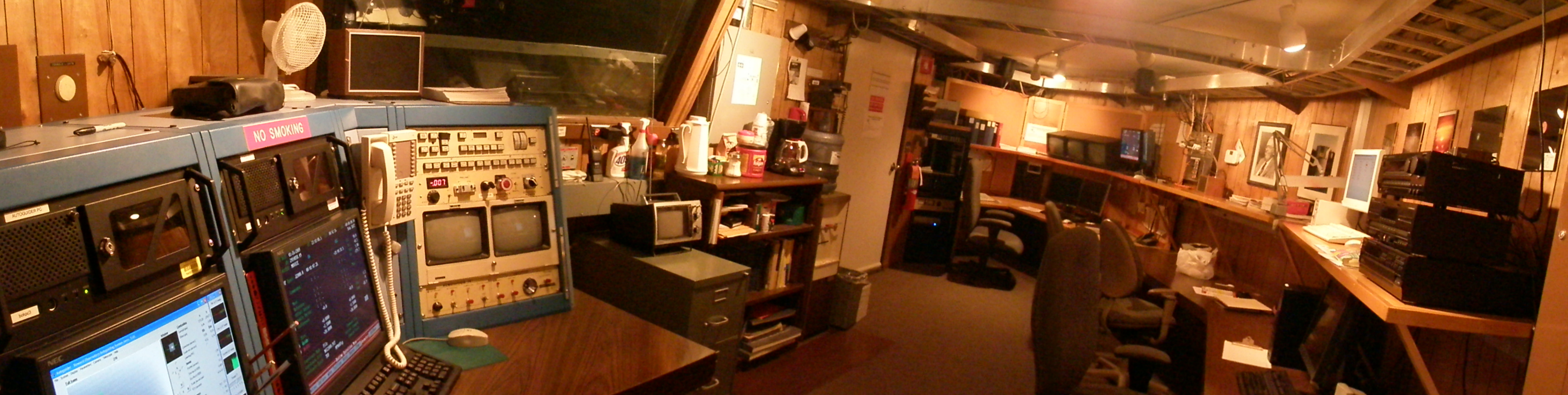
Panorama of the control room

As of 2008, there were instruments that are mainly used at the 90-inch, two that worked in the optical and one in the near-IR. The 90prime instrument, whose principal investigator is Edward Olszewski, was a prime focus, wide-field imager capable of imaging 1 square degree on the sky, while the B&C Spectrograph did spectroscopy. The Steward 256x256 NIR Camera, which has been available at the telescope since 1991, used a NICMOS array which was built during the development of the NICMOS instrument on the HST. The 90-inch was also fitted with an eyepiece for direct viewing by a human observer, uncharacteristic for telescopes of this size.

== See also ==
- Bok globules
- List of largest optical telescopes in the 20th century
- List of observatories
- Lists of telescopes
- Kitt Peak National Observatory - site of telescope
