= List of minor planets: 810001–811000 =

The following is a partial list of minor planets, running from minor-planet number 810001 through 811000, inclusive. The primary data for this and other partial lists is based on JPL's "Small-Body Orbital Elements" and data available from the Minor Planet Center. Critical list information is also provided by the MPC, unless otherwise specified from Lowell Observatory. A detailed description of the table's columns and additional sources are given on the main page including a complete list of every page in this series, and a statistical break-up on the dynamical classification of minor planets.

Also see the summary list of all named bodies in numerical and alphabetical order, and the corresponding naming citations for the number range of this particular list. New namings may only be added to this list after official publication, as the preannouncement of names is condemned by the Working Group for Small Bodies Nomenclature of the International Astronomical Union.

Near-Earth obj.	MBA (inner)	MBA (outer)	Centaur
Mars-crosser	MBA (middle)	Jupiter trojan	Trans-Neptunian obj.
Unclassified

== 810001–810100 ==
Designation			Discovery			Properties		Ref
Permanent	Provisional	Named after	Date	Site	Discoverer(s)	Category	Diam.	Ref
810001	2020 DQ_{19}	—	February 16, 2020	Mount Lemmon	Mount Lemmon Survey	·	1.3 km	MPC · JPL
810002	2020 EE_{1}	—	March 3, 2020	Haleakala	Pan-STARRS 2	BRA	1.1 km	MPC · JPL
810003	2020 EV_{1}	—	March 5, 2020	Mount Lemmon	Mount Lemmon Survey	critical	2.4 km	MPC · JPL
810004	2020 EY_{2}	—	March 5, 2020	Mount Lemmon	Mount Lemmon Survey	·	1.7 km	MPC · JPL
810005	2020 EA_{4}	—	March 1, 2020	Cerro Tololo-DECam	DECam	·	1.3 km	MPC · JPL
810006	2020 EK_{4}	—	March 5, 2020	Mount Lemmon	Mount Lemmon Survey	·	1.3 km	MPC · JPL
810007	2020 FG_{8}	—	April 1, 2009	Mount Lemmon	Mount Lemmon Survey	·	1.9 km	MPC · JPL
810008	2020 FA_{10}	—	March 21, 2020	Haleakala	Pan-STARRS 1	·	1.2 km	MPC · JPL
810009	2020 FH_{10}	—	March 25, 2020	Haleakala	Pan-STARRS 1	·	1.3 km	MPC · JPL
810010	2020 FU_{10}	—	May 25, 2015	Mount Lemmon	Mount Lemmon Survey	·	1.9 km	MPC · JPL
810011	2020 FT_{11}	—	March 21, 2020	Haleakala	Pan-STARRS 1	·	1.8 km	MPC · JPL
810012	2020 FN_{12}	—	April 24, 2007	Mount Lemmon	Mount Lemmon Survey	H	410 m	MPC · JPL
810013	2020 FW_{12}	—	March 23, 2020	Haleakala	Pan-STARRS 1	·	1.2 km	MPC · JPL
810014	2020 FN_{13}	—	March 21, 2020	Haleakala	Pan-STARRS 1	·	1.4 km	MPC · JPL
810015	2020 FV_{13}	—	January 8, 2019	Haleakala	Pan-STARRS 1	EUP	2.2 km	MPC · JPL
810016	2020 FM_{14}	—	March 21, 2020	Haleakala	Pan-STARRS 1	·	1.8 km	MPC · JPL
810017	2020 FU_{14}	—	March 24, 2020	Haleakala	Pan-STARRS 1	·	1.4 km	MPC · JPL
810018	2020 FQ_{15}	—	September 8, 2007	Mount Lemmon	Mount Lemmon Survey	·	2.3 km	MPC · JPL
810019	2020 FT_{15}	—	March 19, 2020	XuYi	PMO NEO Survey Program	TIR	2.1 km	MPC · JPL
810020	2020 FH_{18}	—	May 20, 2015	Cerro Tololo	DECam	·	1.4 km	MPC · JPL
810021	2020 FT_{20}	—	March 21, 2020	Haleakala	Pan-STARRS 1	·	2.1 km	MPC · JPL
810022	2020 FC_{21}	—	March 21, 2020	Haleakala	Pan-STARRS 1	THM	1.6 km	MPC · JPL
810023	2020 FH_{22}	—	March 21, 2020	Haleakala	Pan-STARRS 2	·	1.8 km	MPC · JPL
810024	2020 FY_{22}	—	April 18, 2015	Cerro Tololo	DECam	critical	920 m	MPC · JPL
810025	2020 FK_{24}	—	March 25, 2020	Mount Lemmon	Mount Lemmon Survey	·	1.6 km	MPC · JPL
810026	2020 FX_{24}	—	April 30, 2014	Haleakala	Pan-STARRS 1	EUP	2.3 km	MPC · JPL
810027	2020 FZ_{25}	—	August 24, 2017	Haleakala	Pan-STARRS 1	·	1.6 km	MPC · JPL
810028	2020 FU_{26}	—	February 1, 2009	Kitt Peak	Spacewatch	·	1.2 km	MPC · JPL
810029	2020 FD_{27}	—	March 21, 2020	Haleakala	Pan-STARRS 1	·	1.4 km	MPC · JPL
810030	2020 FG_{27}	—	February 28, 2014	Haleakala	Pan-STARRS 1	HYG	1.7 km	MPC · JPL
810031	2020 FL_{27}	—	March 25, 2020	Mount Lemmon	Mount Lemmon Survey	·	2.3 km	MPC · JPL
810032	2020 FB_{28}	—	March 17, 2020	XuYi	PMO NEO Survey Program	·	1.3 km	MPC · JPL
810033	2020 FR_{29}	—	March 21, 2020	Haleakala	Pan-STARRS 1	·	1.7 km	MPC · JPL
810034	2020 FP_{30}	—	March 22, 2020	Haleakala	Pan-STARRS 2	BRA	1.0 km	MPC · JPL
810035	2020 FV_{30}	—	May 20, 2015	Cerro Tololo	DECam	VER	1.8 km	MPC · JPL
810036	2020 FK_{31}	—	March 21, 2020	Haleakala	Pan-STARRS 1	·	1.5 km	MPC · JPL
810037	2020 FZ_{31}	—	March 21, 2020	Haleakala	Pan-STARRS 1	KOR	950 m	MPC · JPL
810038	2020 FQ_{32}	—	March 25, 2020	Mount Lemmon	Mount Lemmon Survey	·	2.1 km	MPC · JPL
810039	2020 FB_{35}	—	March 24, 2020	Haleakala	Pan-STARRS 1	·	2.1 km	MPC · JPL
810040	2020 FO_{36}	—	March 16, 2020	Mount Lemmon	Mount Lemmon Survey	·	1.4 km	MPC · JPL
810041	2020 FO_{37}	—	March 21, 2020	Haleakala	Pan-STARRS 1	·	2.2 km	MPC · JPL
810042	2020 FY_{38}	—	March 16, 2020	Mount Lemmon	Mount Lemmon Survey	·	1.3 km	MPC · JPL
810043	2020 FG_{41}	—	March 16, 2020	Mount Lemmon	Mount Lemmon Survey	EOS	1.3 km	MPC · JPL
810044	2020 FO_{41}	—	January 22, 2015	Haleakala	Pan-STARRS 1	·	1.6 km	MPC · JPL
810045	2020 FG_{42}	—	November 10, 2013	Mount Lemmon	Mount Lemmon Survey	·	1.6 km	MPC · JPL
810046	2020 FM_{42}	—	March 29, 2020	Haleakala	Pan-STARRS 2	AGN	960 m	MPC · JPL
810047	2020 FU_{43}	—	March 21, 2020	Haleakala	Pan-STARRS 1	(895)	2.2 km	MPC · JPL
810048	2020 FF_{44}	—	March 21, 2020	Haleakala	Pan-STARRS 1	·	1.8 km	MPC · JPL
810049	2020 FM_{44}	—	March 17, 2020	Cerro Tololo-DECam	DECam	·	1.8 km	MPC · JPL
810050	2020 FW_{44}	—	March 16, 2020	Mount Lemmon	Mount Lemmon Survey	·	1.3 km	MPC · JPL
810051	2020 FZ_{44}	—	March 16, 2020	Mount Lemmon	Mount Lemmon Survey	·	1.3 km	MPC · JPL
810052	2020 GG_{4}	—	April 3, 2020	Mount Lemmon	Mount Lemmon Survey	·	930 m	MPC · JPL
810053	2020 GO_{4}	—	April 3, 2020	Mount Lemmon	Mount Lemmon Survey	THM	1.8 km	MPC · JPL
810054	2020 GU_{4}	—	April 2, 2020	Haleakala	Pan-STARRS 1	·	2.5 km	MPC · JPL
810055	2020 GB_{5}	—	April 2, 2020	Mount Lemmon	Mount Lemmon Survey	·	1.5 km	MPC · JPL
810056	2020 GA_{7}	—	April 7, 2014	Mount Lemmon	Mount Lemmon Survey	·	2.2 km	MPC · JPL
810057	2020 GX_{7}	—	April 15, 2020	Mount Lemmon	Mount Lemmon Survey	·	2.1 km	MPC · JPL
810058	2020 GD_{9}	—	October 1, 2005	Mount Lemmon	Mount Lemmon Survey	URS	2.3 km	MPC · JPL
810059	2020 GL_{10}	—	April 2, 2020	Mount Lemmon	Mount Lemmon Survey	·	2.0 km	MPC · JPL
810060	2020 GC_{13}	—	February 28, 2014	Haleakala	Pan-STARRS 1	·	2.0 km	MPC · JPL
810061	2020 GH_{14}	—	April 15, 2020	Mount Lemmon	Mount Lemmon Survey	LIX	2.4 km	MPC · JPL
810062	2020 GV_{14}	—	October 28, 2016	Haleakala	Pan-STARRS 1	TIR	2.0 km	MPC · JPL
810063	2020 GU_{16}	—	November 11, 2016	Mount Lemmon	Mount Lemmon Survey	H	440 m	MPC · JPL
810064	2020 GH_{17}	—	April 15, 2020	Mount Lemmon	Mount Lemmon Survey	·	1.3 km	MPC · JPL
810065	2020 GA_{18}	—	April 2, 2020	Mount Lemmon	Mount Lemmon Survey	·	2.0 km	MPC · JPL
810066	2020 GE_{18}	—	August 28, 2016	Mount Lemmon	Mount Lemmon Survey	·	1.8 km	MPC · JPL
810067	2020 GD_{22}	—	April 3, 2020	Mount Lemmon	Mount Lemmon Survey	·	1.8 km	MPC · JPL
810068	2020 GY_{22}	—	February 12, 2004	Kitt Peak	Spacewatch	·	1.0 km	MPC · JPL
810069	2020 GZ_{24}	—	April 2, 2020	Haleakala	Pan-STARRS 1	·	1.9 km	MPC · JPL
810070	2020 GS_{26}	—	September 22, 2017	Haleakala	Pan-STARRS 1	·	970 m	MPC · JPL
810071	2020 GN_{27}	—	September 19, 2017	Haleakala	Pan-STARRS 1	·	1 km	MPC · JPL
810072	2020 GZ_{28}	—	January 4, 2019	Haleakala	Pan-STARRS 1	·	1.3 km	MPC · JPL
810073	2020 GP_{34}	—	April 15, 2020	Mount Lemmon	Mount Lemmon Survey	·	1.7 km	MPC · JPL
810074	2020 HF_{1}	—	April 16, 2020	Mauna Loa	ATLAS	APO	570 m	MPC · JPL
810075	2020 HL_{2}	—	April 19, 2015	Mount Lemmon	Mount Lemmon Survey	H	350 m	MPC · JPL
810076	2020 HW_{10}	—	April 18, 2020	Haleakala	Pan-STARRS 2	H	470 m	MPC · JPL
810077	2020 HQ_{11}	—	April 19, 2020	Haleakala	Pan-STARRS 1	·	1.6 km	MPC · JPL
810078	2020 HH_{12}	—	April 16, 2020	Mount Lemmon	Mount Lemmon Survey	·	1.7 km	MPC · JPL
810079	2020 HP_{12}	—	May 24, 2015	Haleakala	Pan-STARRS 1	·	1.8 km	MPC · JPL
810080	2020 HY_{12}	—	March 13, 2014	Mount Lemmon	Mount Lemmon Survey	T_{j} (2.96)	2.4 km	MPC · JPL
810081	2020 HH_{14}	—	April 16, 2020	Mount Lemmon	Mount Lemmon Survey	·	1.9 km	MPC · JPL
810082	2020 HJ_{14}	—	April 19, 2020	Haleakala	Pan-STARRS 1	·	1.4 km	MPC · JPL
810083	2020 HL_{14}	—	April 18, 2015	Cerro Tololo	DECam	·	1.3 km	MPC · JPL
810084	2020 HE_{15}	—	April 30, 2009	Kitt Peak	Spacewatch	TIR	2.3 km	MPC · JPL
810085	2020 HQ_{16}	—	April 26, 2020	Mount Lemmon	Mount Lemmon Survey	·	1.9 km	MPC · JPL
810086	2020 HT_{17}	—	April 28, 2020	Haleakala	Pan-STARRS 1	·	2.3 km	MPC · JPL
810087	2020 HQ_{18}	—	April 20, 2020	Haleakala	Pan-STARRS 1	·	2.5 km	MPC · JPL
810088	2020 HA_{20}	—	April 22, 2020	Haleakala	Pan-STARRS 1	·	1.9 km	MPC · JPL
810089	2020 HD_{20}	—	July 11, 2016	Haleakala	Pan-STARRS 1	EOS	1.2 km	MPC · JPL
810090	2020 HF_{20}	—	April 8, 2014	Mount Lemmon	Mount Lemmon Survey	·	2.2 km	MPC · JPL
810091	2020 HX_{20}	—	September 24, 2011	Haleakala	Pan-STARRS 1	·	1.8 km	MPC · JPL
810092	2020 HJ_{22}	—	May 3, 2014	Mount Lemmon	Mount Lemmon Survey	critical	2.1 km	MPC · JPL
810093	2020 HR_{22}	—	April 20, 2020	Haleakala	Pan-STARRS 2	·	2.1 km	MPC · JPL
810094	2020 HV_{22}	—	August 2, 2016	Haleakala	Pan-STARRS 1	·	2.2 km	MPC · JPL
810095	2020 HP_{23}	—	April 20, 2020	Haleakala	Pan-STARRS 2	EOS	1.2 km	MPC · JPL
810096	2020 HZ_{23}	—	February 2, 2008	Mount Lemmon	Mount Lemmon Survey	LIX	2.6 km	MPC · JPL
810097	2020 HM_{25}	—	April 21, 2020	Haleakala	Pan-STARRS 1	·	1.2 km	MPC · JPL
810098	2020 HC_{26}	—	June 11, 2015	Haleakala	Pan-STARRS 1	·	1.1 km	MPC · JPL
810099	2020 HU_{26}	—	June 20, 2015	Haleakala	Pan-STARRS 1	THM	1.7 km	MPC · JPL
810100	2020 HV_{26}	—	April 28, 2020	Haleakala	Pan-STARRS 1	·	2.1 km	MPC · JPL

== 810101–810200 ==
back to top

Designation			Discovery			Properties		Ref
Permanent	Provisional	Named after	Date	Site	Discoverer(s)	Category	Diam.	Ref
810101	2020 HT_{27}	—	April 21, 2020	Haleakala	Pan-STARRS 1	·	1.8 km	MPC · JPL
810102	2020 HU_{27}	—	June 11, 2015	Haleakala	Pan-STARRS 1	·	1.3 km	MPC · JPL
810103	2020 HM_{28}	—	August 2, 2016	Haleakala	Pan-STARRS 1	·	1.5 km	MPC · JPL
810104	2020 HO_{28}	—	August 2, 2016	Haleakala	Pan-STARRS 1	·	1.9 km	MPC · JPL
810105	2020 HA_{29}	—	April 28, 2020	Haleakala	Pan-STARRS 1	·	1.4 km	MPC · JPL
810106	2020 HK_{29}	—	April 29, 2020	Haleakala	Pan-STARRS 2	·	1.5 km	MPC · JPL
810107	2020 HN_{30}	—	June 28, 2015	Haleakala	Pan-STARRS 1	·	2.3 km	MPC · JPL
810108	2020 HE_{31}	—	January 12, 2019	Haleakala	Pan-STARRS 1	·	1.7 km	MPC · JPL
810109	2020 HL_{31}	—	June 28, 2015	Haleakala	Pan-STARRS 1	·	1.6 km	MPC · JPL
810110	2020 HD_{32}	—	April 20, 2020	Haleakala	Pan-STARRS 1	·	1.8 km	MPC · JPL
810111	2020 HA_{33}	—	April 22, 2020	Haleakala	Pan-STARRS 1	·	1.9 km	MPC · JPL
810112	2020 HB_{33}	—	April 20, 2020	Haleakala	Pan-STARRS 1	·	1.7 km	MPC · JPL
810113	2020 HT_{34}	—	April 21, 2020	Haleakala	Pan-STARRS 1	·	2.2 km	MPC · JPL
810114	2020 HB_{35}	—	April 21, 2020	Haleakala	Pan-STARRS 2	·	1.7 km	MPC · JPL
810115	2020 HE_{35}	—	April 19, 2020	Haleakala	Pan-STARRS 1	·	1.5 km	MPC · JPL
810116	2020 HV_{36}	—	April 20, 2020	Haleakala	Pan-STARRS 1	·	1.7 km	MPC · JPL
810117	2020 HX_{36}	—	April 20, 2020	Haleakala	Pan-STARRS 2	VER	2.1 km	MPC · JPL
810118	2020 HO_{37}	—	April 20, 2020	Haleakala	Pan-STARRS 1	·	2.0 km	MPC · JPL
810119	2020 HS_{37}	—	April 28, 2020	Haleakala	Pan-STARRS 1	·	2.2 km	MPC · JPL
810120	2020 HA_{38}	—	April 18, 2020	Haleakala	Pan-STARRS 1	THM	1.7 km	MPC · JPL
810121	2020 HE_{38}	—	May 25, 2015	Mount Lemmon	Mount Lemmon Survey	·	1.1 km	MPC · JPL
810122	2020 HF_{38}	—	April 28, 2020	Haleakala	Pan-STARRS 1	·	1.7 km	MPC · JPL
810123	2020 HK_{38}	—	April 20, 2020	Haleakala	Pan-STARRS 1	·	2.2 km	MPC · JPL
810124	2020 HO_{38}	—	April 19, 2020	Haleakala	Pan-STARRS 2	·	2.5 km	MPC · JPL
810125	2020 HT_{38}	—	April 21, 2020	Haleakala	Pan-STARRS 1	EOS	1.4 km	MPC · JPL
810126	2020 HU_{38}	—	April 20, 2020	Haleakala	Pan-STARRS 1	·	1.6 km	MPC · JPL
810127	2020 HH_{39}	—	May 20, 2015	Cerro Tololo	DECam	·	1.3 km	MPC · JPL
810128	2020 HL_{40}	—	September 26, 2011	Kitt Peak	Spacewatch	·	2.5 km	MPC · JPL
810129	2020 HG_{42}	—	September 13, 2005	Kitt Peak	Spacewatch	·	1.5 km	MPC · JPL
810130	2020 HM_{46}	—	April 9, 2014	Haleakala	Pan-STARRS 1	·	2.4 km	MPC · JPL
810131	2020 HN_{46}	—	April 16, 2020	Mount Lemmon	Mount Lemmon Survey	·	1.6 km	MPC · JPL
810132	2020 HN_{47}	—	April 18, 2020	Mount Lemmon	Mount Lemmon Survey	·	2.2 km	MPC · JPL
810133	2020 HM_{48}	—	April 18, 2020	Haleakala	Pan-STARRS 1	·	1.3 km	MPC · JPL
810134	2020 HQ_{48}	—	March 8, 2014	Mount Lemmon	Mount Lemmon Survey	·	2.0 km	MPC · JPL
810135	2020 HX_{48}	—	December 9, 2010	Mount Lemmon	Mount Lemmon Survey	H	470 m	MPC · JPL
810136	2020 HM_{50}	—	April 19, 2020	Haleakala	Pan-STARRS 1	·	1.8 km	MPC · JPL
810137	2020 HW_{50}	—	April 19, 2020	Haleakala	Pan-STARRS 2	H	430 m	MPC · JPL
810138	2020 HK_{51}	—	April 20, 2020	Haleakala	Pan-STARRS 1	TIR	2.2 km	MPC · JPL
810139	2020 HX_{51}	—	April 20, 2020	Haleakala	Pan-STARRS 1	·	1.9 km	MPC · JPL
810140	2020 HM_{52}	—	April 24, 2014	Haleakala	Pan-STARRS 1	·	2.0 km	MPC · JPL
810141	2020 HY_{52}	—	April 20, 2020	Haleakala	Pan-STARRS 2	·	2.2 km	MPC · JPL
810142	2020 HC_{55}	—	April 21, 2020	Haleakala	Pan-STARRS 1	·	1.8 km	MPC · JPL
810143	2020 HY_{55}	—	April 21, 2020	Haleakala	Pan-STARRS 1	EOS	1.4 km	MPC · JPL
810144	2020 HJ_{56}	—	April 21, 2020	Haleakala	Pan-STARRS 1	·	1.9 km	MPC · JPL
810145	2020 HV_{56}	—	April 24, 2014	Cerro Tololo	DECam	·	2.1 km	MPC · JPL
810146	2020 HH_{57}	—	April 21, 2020	Haleakala	Pan-STARRS 2	·	2.1 km	MPC · JPL
810147	2020 HJ_{59}	—	April 22, 2020	Haleakala	Pan-STARRS 1	EOS	1.3 km	MPC · JPL
810148	2020 HU_{60}	—	August 3, 2015	Haleakala	Pan-STARRS 1	THB	2.0 km	MPC · JPL
810149	2020 HZ_{60}	—	June 3, 2009	Mount Lemmon	Mount Lemmon Survey	TIR	2.0 km	MPC · JPL
810150	2020 HA_{61}	—	April 24, 2020	Mount Lemmon	Mount Lemmon Survey	·	2.3 km	MPC · JPL
810151	2020 HM_{61}	—	March 28, 2017	Haleakala	Pan-STARRS 1	H	370 m	MPC · JPL
810152	2020 HN_{61}	—	October 4, 2016	Kitt Peak	Spacewatch	·	2.1 km	MPC · JPL
810153	2020 HX_{61}	—	October 23, 2011	Haleakala	Pan-STARRS 1	EOS	1.4 km	MPC · JPL
810154	2020 HY_{61}	—	April 26, 2020	Mount Lemmon	Mount Lemmon Survey	·	1.7 km	MPC · JPL
810155	2020 HZ_{61}	—	June 26, 2015	Haleakala	Pan-STARRS 1	·	2.1 km	MPC · JPL
810156	2020 HT_{62}	—	March 28, 2014	Mount Lemmon	Mount Lemmon Survey	LIX	2.1 km	MPC · JPL
810157	2020 HG_{63}	—	April 28, 2020	Haleakala	Pan-STARRS 1	·	1.2 km	MPC · JPL
810158	2020 HS_{63}	—	July 23, 2015	Haleakala	Pan-STARRS 1	·	2.4 km	MPC · JPL
810159	2020 HS_{65}	—	April 20, 2020	Haleakala	Pan-STARRS 1	·	1.9 km	MPC · JPL
810160	2020 HE_{66}	—	April 22, 2020	Haleakala	Pan-STARRS 1	(8737)	1.8 km	MPC · JPL
810161	2020 HF_{66}	—	April 22, 2020	Haleakala	Pan-STARRS 1	·	2.1 km	MPC · JPL
810162	2020 HL_{66}	—	April 27, 2020	Haleakala	Pan-STARRS 1	·	1.6 km	MPC · JPL
810163	2020 HB_{67}	—	April 22, 2020	Haleakala	Pan-STARRS 1	·	1.9 km	MPC · JPL
810164	2020 HD_{67}	—	April 22, 2020	Haleakala	Pan-STARRS 1	EOS	1.3 km	MPC · JPL
810165	2020 HF_{67}	—	April 22, 2020	Haleakala	Pan-STARRS 1	EOS	1.2 km	MPC · JPL
810166	2020 HH_{67}	—	April 22, 2020	Haleakala	Pan-STARRS 1	·	1.7 km	MPC · JPL
810167	2020 HL_{67}	—	April 23, 2020	Mount Lemmon	Mount Lemmon Survey	TIR	1.8 km	MPC · JPL
810168	2020 HN_{67}	—	April 26, 2020	Haleakala	Pan-STARRS 1	HYG	1.9 km	MPC · JPL
810169	2020 HR_{67}	—	April 27, 2020	Haleakala	Pan-STARRS 1	·	1.3 km	MPC · JPL
810170	2020 HU_{67}	—	April 28, 2020	Haleakala	Pan-STARRS 1	·	1.8 km	MPC · JPL
810171	2020 HD_{68}	—	April 19, 2020	Mount Lemmon	Mount Lemmon Survey	·	1.6 km	MPC · JPL
810172	2020 HT_{68}	—	April 16, 2020	Haleakala	Pan-STARRS 1	·	2.0 km	MPC · JPL
810173	2020 HX_{68}	—	April 18, 2020	Haleakala	Pan-STARRS 2	·	2.0 km	MPC · JPL
810174	2020 HB_{69}	—	April 20, 2020	Haleakala	Pan-STARRS 1	·	1.9 km	MPC · JPL
810175	2020 HC_{69}	—	April 20, 2020	Haleakala	Pan-STARRS 1	TIR	1.5 km	MPC · JPL
810176	2020 HV_{69}	—	April 28, 2020	Haleakala	Pan-STARRS 1	·	1.5 km	MPC · JPL
810177	2020 HR_{70}	—	April 19, 2020	Haleakala	Pan-STARRS 2	(58892)	2.2 km	MPC · JPL
810178	2020 HZ_{77}	—	April 19, 2020	Haleakala	Pan-STARRS 1	·	2.1 km	MPC · JPL
810179	2020 HL_{80}	—	April 21, 2020	Haleakala	Pan-STARRS 2	·	1.9 km	MPC · JPL
810180	2020 HX_{81}	—	April 21, 2020	Haleakala	Pan-STARRS 2	·	2.3 km	MPC · JPL
810181	2020 HG_{82}	—	March 19, 2009	Mount Lemmon	Mount Lemmon Survey	·	1.8 km	MPC · JPL
810182	2020 HP_{83}	—	May 20, 2015	Cerro Tololo	DECam	EOS	1.2 km	MPC · JPL
810183	2020 HZ_{85}	—	May 21, 2015	Haleakala	Pan-STARRS 1	·	1.1 km	MPC · JPL
810184	2020 HB_{86}	—	April 25, 2015	Haleakala	Pan-STARRS 1	EOS	1.0 km	MPC · JPL
810185	2020 HG_{89}	—	April 18, 2015	Cerro Tololo	DECam	·	1.5 km	MPC · JPL
810186	2020 HK_{89}	—	February 26, 2014	Haleakala	Pan-STARRS 1	·	2.0 km	MPC · JPL
810187	2020 HR_{89}	—	April 26, 2020	Mount Lemmon	Mount Lemmon Survey	EOS	1.4 km	MPC · JPL
810188	2020 HZ_{90}	—	April 19, 2020	Haleakala	Pan-STARRS 1	THM	1.5 km	MPC · JPL
810189	2020 HL_{91}	—	April 21, 2020	Haleakala	Pan-STARRS 1	·	2.4 km	MPC · JPL
810190	2020 HZ_{91}	—	April 28, 2020	Haleakala	Pan-STARRS 1	·	1.6 km	MPC · JPL
810191	2020 HU_{92}	—	June 11, 2015	Haleakala	Pan-STARRS 1	·	2.0 km	MPC · JPL
810192	2020 HE_{93}	—	May 4, 2014	Haleakala	Pan-STARRS 1	·	2.3 km	MPC · JPL
810193	2020 HL_{93}	—	April 21, 2020	Haleakala	Pan-STARRS 2	THM	1.9 km	MPC · JPL
810194	2020 HT_{93}	—	April 27, 2020	Haleakala	Pan-STARRS 1	VER	2.1 km	MPC · JPL
810195	2020 HU_{93}	—	April 30, 2020	Mount Lemmon	Mount Lemmon Survey	·	2.6 km	MPC · JPL
810196	2020 HY_{93}	—	April 18, 2020	Mount Lemmon	Mount Lemmon Survey	H	460 m	MPC · JPL
810197	2020 HR_{94}	—	April 21, 2020	Haleakala	Pan-STARRS 1	ELF	2.4 km	MPC · JPL
810198	2020 HF_{95}	—	April 22, 2020	Haleakala	Pan-STARRS 1	LIX	2.1 km	MPC · JPL
810199	2020 HK_{95}	—	April 22, 2020	Mount Lemmon	Mount Lemmon Survey	·	2.3 km	MPC · JPL
810200	2020 HM_{95}	—	May 18, 2015	Haleakala	Pan-STARRS 1	·	2.0 km	MPC · JPL

== 810201–810300 ==
back to top

Designation			Discovery			Properties		Ref
Permanent	Provisional	Named after	Date	Site	Discoverer(s)	Category	Diam.	Ref
810201	2020 HS_{98}	—	April 29, 2020	Haleakala	Pan-STARRS 2	TIR	1.6 km	MPC · JPL
810202	2020 HZ_{98}	—	May 20, 2015	Cerro Tololo	DECam	·	1.4 km	MPC · JPL
810203	2020 HC_{99}	—	April 27, 2020	Haleakala	Pan-STARRS 1	·	1.6 km	MPC · JPL
810204	2020 HQ_{99}	—	April 23, 2020	Mount Lemmon	Mount Lemmon Survey	·	2.1 km	MPC · JPL
810205	2020 HW_{99}	—	April 22, 2020	Haleakala	Pan-STARRS 1	·	2.0 km	MPC · JPL
810206	2020 HE_{100}	—	April 22, 2020	Haleakala	Pan-STARRS 1	VER	1.9 km	MPC · JPL
810207	2020 HH_{100}	—	April 18, 2020	Haleakala	Pan-STARRS 2	·	2.0 km	MPC · JPL
810208	2020 HJ_{100}	—	April 22, 2020	Haleakala	Pan-STARRS 1	·	2.2 km	MPC · JPL
810209	2020 HN_{100}	—	April 20, 2020	Haleakala	Pan-STARRS 2	·	1.7 km	MPC · JPL
810210	2020 HD_{105}	—	April 19, 2020	Haleakala	Pan-STARRS 1	·	1.3 km	MPC · JPL
810211	2020 HY_{108}	—	February 25, 2014	Kitt Peak	Spacewatch	THM	1.4 km	MPC · JPL
810212	2020 HE_{110}	—	November 21, 2017	Haleakala	Pan-STARRS 1	EOS	1.3 km	MPC · JPL
810213	2020 HJ_{111}	—	April 18, 2015	Cerro Tololo	DECam	EOS	1.3 km	MPC · JPL
810214	2020 HF_{112}	—	April 23, 2014	Cerro Tololo	DECam	·	2.2 km	MPC · JPL
810215	2020 HT_{112}	—	April 16, 2020	Mount Lemmon	Mount Lemmon Survey	·	2.2 km	MPC · JPL
810216	2020 HZ_{113}	—	April 21, 2020	Haleakala	Pan-STARRS 2	VER	1.9 km	MPC · JPL
810217	2020 HV_{114}	—	April 18, 2020	Haleakala	Pan-STARRS 1	·	1.5 km	MPC · JPL
810218	2020 HP_{115}	—	April 16, 2020	Mount Lemmon	Mount Lemmon Survey	·	1.9 km	MPC · JPL
810219	2020 HC_{117}	—	April 23, 2020	Mount Lemmon	Mount Lemmon Survey	·	2.1 km	MPC · JPL
810220	2020 HF_{117}	—	April 22, 2020	Haleakala	Pan-STARRS 1	·	1.8 km	MPC · JPL
810221	2020 HN_{117}	—	April 27, 2020	Mount Lemmon	Mount Lemmon Survey	EOS	1.2 km	MPC · JPL
810222	2020 HO_{118}	—	January 20, 2015	Haleakala	Pan-STARRS 1	·	1.3 km	MPC · JPL
810223	2020 HS_{118}	—	April 22, 2020	Haleakala	Pan-STARRS 1	·	2.0 km	MPC · JPL
810224	2020 HF_{119}	—	April 27, 2020	Haleakala	Pan-STARRS 1	·	2.0 km	MPC · JPL
810225	2020 HH_{119}	—	May 20, 2015	Cerro Tololo	DECam	·	1.4 km	MPC · JPL
810226	2020 HP_{119}	—	November 9, 2013	Mount Lemmon	Mount Lemmon Survey	·	1.1 km	MPC · JPL
810227	2020 HR_{119}	—	April 19, 2020	Haleakala	Pan-STARRS 1	AGN	760 m	MPC · JPL
810228	2020 HC_{120}	—	January 22, 2015	Haleakala	Pan-STARRS 1	·	960 m	MPC · JPL
810229	2020 HJ_{120}	—	August 14, 2016	Haleakala	Pan-STARRS 1	·	1.6 km	MPC · JPL
810230	2020 HN_{120}	—	April 20, 2020	Haleakala	Pan-STARRS 1	·	1.8 km	MPC · JPL
810231	2020 HO_{120}	—	March 5, 2014	Cerro Tololo	High Cadence Transient Survey	·	1.7 km	MPC · JPL
810232	2020 HQ_{120}	—	April 27, 2020	Haleakala	Pan-STARRS 1	·	1.3 km	MPC · JPL
810233	2020 HX_{120}	—	May 11, 2015	Mount Lemmon	Mount Lemmon Survey	·	1.2 km	MPC · JPL
810234	2020 HA_{121}	—	April 21, 2020	Haleakala	Pan-STARRS 1	·	2.0 km	MPC · JPL
810235	2020 HB_{121}	—	May 21, 2015	Cerro Tololo	DECam	·	1.4 km	MPC · JPL
810236	2020 HD_{121}	—	April 22, 2020	Haleakala	Pan-STARRS 1	·	1.7 km	MPC · JPL
810237	2020 HH_{121}	—	May 20, 2015	Cerro Tololo	DECam	·	1.1 km	MPC · JPL
810238	2020 HA_{122}	—	April 26, 2020	Mount Lemmon	Mount Lemmon Survey	·	1.9 km	MPC · JPL
810239	2020 HH_{122}	—	May 21, 2015	Cerro Tololo	DECam	·	1.1 km	MPC · JPL
810240	2020 HM_{122}	—	April 21, 2020	Mount Lemmon	Mount Lemmon Survey	·	1.9 km	MPC · JPL
810241	2020 HQ_{123}	—	June 11, 2015	Haleakala	Pan-STARRS 1	·	1.3 km	MPC · JPL
810242	2020 HR_{123}	—	April 22, 2020	Mount Lemmon	Mount Lemmon Survey	·	1.5 km	MPC · JPL
810243	2020 HE_{128}	—	May 10, 2015	Mount Lemmon	Mount Lemmon Survey	·	1.9 km	MPC · JPL
810244	2020 HZ_{128}	—	April 20, 2020	Haleakala	Pan-STARRS 1	·	1.9 km	MPC · JPL
810245	2020 HH_{129}	—	May 22, 2015	Haleakala	Pan-STARRS 1	·	1.7 km	MPC · JPL
810246	2020 HC_{130}	—	April 19, 2020	Haleakala	Pan-STARRS 1	HOF	1.8 km	MPC · JPL
810247	2020 HJ_{140}	—	April 25, 2015	Haleakala	Pan-STARRS 1	·	1.2 km	MPC · JPL
810248	2020 HO_{140}	—	April 20, 2020	Haleakala	Pan-STARRS 2	·	2.0 km	MPC · JPL
810249	2020 HQ_{140}	—	April 23, 2020	Mount Lemmon	Mount Lemmon Survey	·	2.5 km	MPC · JPL
810250	2020 HR_{142}	—	April 27, 2020	Mount Lemmon	Mount Lemmon Survey	·	1.8 km	MPC · JPL
810251	2020 HX_{144}	—	August 8, 2016	Haleakala	Pan-STARRS 1	·	1.7 km	MPC · JPL
810252	2020 HJ_{147}	—	April 5, 2019	Haleakala	Pan-STARRS 1	L5	5.4 km	MPC · JPL
810253	2020 HD_{149}	—	September 20, 2009	Mount Lemmon	Mount Lemmon Survey	·	890 m	MPC · JPL
810254	2020 HW_{151}	—	April 24, 2015	Haleakala	Pan-STARRS 1	·	1.3 km	MPC · JPL
810255	2020 HA_{152}	—	February 3, 2009	Kitt Peak	Spacewatch	·	1.4 km	MPC · JPL
810256	2020 HU_{157}	—	April 22, 2020	Haleakala	Pan-STARRS 1	·	1.6 km	MPC · JPL
810257	2020 HP_{159}	—	October 11, 2012	Haleakala	Pan-STARRS 1	·	1.3 km	MPC · JPL
810258	2020 HK_{160}	—	October 18, 2017	Haleakala	Pan-STARRS 1	·	1.7 km	MPC · JPL
810259	2020 HL_{160}	—	September 9, 2007	Mount Lemmon	Mount Lemmon Survey	KOR	910 m	MPC · JPL
810260	2020 HY_{160}	—	October 13, 2017	Mount Lemmon	Mount Lemmon Survey	·	1.9 km	MPC · JPL
810261	2020 HE_{161}	—	April 27, 2020	Haleakala	Pan-STARRS 1	·	2.3 km	MPC · JPL
810262	2020 HO_{161}	—	April 19, 2020	Haleakala	Pan-STARRS 1	·	1.4 km	MPC · JPL
810263	2020 HR_{161}	—	April 21, 2020	Haleakala	Pan-STARRS 1	·	2.1 km	MPC · JPL
810264	2020 HN_{162}	—	April 20, 2020	Haleakala	Pan-STARRS 1	·	1.3 km	MPC · JPL
810265	2020 HV_{163}	—	April 21, 2020	Haleakala	Pan-STARRS 1	·	2.0 km	MPC · JPL
810266	2020 HH_{164}	—	April 22, 2020	Haleakala	Pan-STARRS 1	·	2.1 km	MPC · JPL
810267	2020 HP_{164}	—	April 19, 2020	Haleakala	Pan-STARRS 1	·	1.1 km	MPC · JPL
810268	2020 HQ_{165}	—	March 24, 2015	Mount Lemmon	Mount Lemmon Survey	·	1.2 km	MPC · JPL
810269	2020 HE_{166}	—	April 27, 2020	Haleakala	Pan-STARRS 1	VER	1.9 km	MPC · JPL
810270	2020 HA_{167}	—	April 18, 2015	Cerro Tololo	DECam	KOR	970 m	MPC · JPL
810271	2020 HK_{169}	—	December 16, 2014	Haleakala	Pan-STARRS 1	·	910 m	MPC · JPL
810272	2020 HN_{172}	—	October 22, 2012	Mount Lemmon	Mount Lemmon Survey	·	1.7 km	MPC · JPL
810273	2020 HZ_{179}	—	April 20, 2020	Haleakala	Pan-STARRS 1	L5	6.5 km	MPC · JPL
810274	2020 HB_{180}	—	April 16, 2020	Mount Lemmon	Mount Lemmon Survey	L5	6.0 km	MPC · JPL
810275	2020 HJ_{181}	—	January 12, 2019	Mount Lemmon	Mount Lemmon Survey	·	1.9 km	MPC · JPL
810276	2020 HT_{181}	—	March 11, 2014	Mount Lemmon	Mount Lemmon Survey	·	1.8 km	MPC · JPL
810277	2020 HQ_{182}	—	May 21, 2015	Haleakala	Pan-STARRS 1	·	1.2 km	MPC · JPL
810278	2020 HC_{184}	—	April 16, 2020	Mount Lemmon	Mount Lemmon Survey	·	1.8 km	MPC · JPL
810279	2020 HG_{184}	—	January 25, 2014	Haleakala	Pan-STARRS 1	·	1.3 km	MPC · JPL
810280	2020 HM_{184}	—	April 22, 2020	Haleakala	Pan-STARRS 1	EUP	1.9 km	MPC · JPL
810281	2020 HH_{191}	—	April 16, 2020	Mount Lemmon	Mount Lemmon Survey	·	2.1 km	MPC · JPL
810282	2020 HO_{191}	—	March 21, 2009	Kitt Peak	Spacewatch	·	1.6 km	MPC · JPL
810283	2020 HW_{192}	—	April 21, 2020	Haleakala	Pan-STARRS 2	·	1.6 km	MPC · JPL
810284	2020 HC_{207}	—	February 1, 2008	Mount Lemmon	Mount Lemmon Survey	T_{j} (2.97)	2.0 km	MPC · JPL
810285	2020 HD_{208}	—	April 21, 2020	Haleakala	Pan-STARRS 2	·	2.1 km	MPC · JPL
810286	2020 JX_{3}	—	December 27, 2016	Mount Lemmon	Mount Lemmon Survey	H	410 m	MPC · JPL
810287	2020 JC_{5}	—	September 10, 2015	Haleakala	Pan-STARRS 1	TIR	1.8 km	MPC · JPL
810288	2020 JF_{5}	—	April 4, 2014	Haleakala	Pan-STARRS 1	·	1.9 km	MPC · JPL
810289	2020 JF_{6}	—	May 2, 2020	Mount Lemmon	Mount Lemmon Survey	·	1.8 km	MPC · JPL
810290	2020 JS_{7}	—	November 13, 2017	Haleakala	Pan-STARRS 1	·	1.5 km	MPC · JPL
810291	2020 JH_{8}	—	January 9, 2019	Mount Lemmon	Mount Lemmon Survey	·	1.7 km	MPC · JPL
810292	2020 JV_{9}	—	May 11, 2020	Haleakala	Pan-STARRS 1	·	2.0 km	MPC · JPL
810293	2020 JJ_{11}	—	August 10, 2016	Haleakala	Pan-STARRS 1	·	1.4 km	MPC · JPL
810294	2020 JS_{11}	—	October 24, 2011	Haleakala	Pan-STARRS 1	EOS	1.4 km	MPC · JPL
810295	2020 JL_{12}	—	July 19, 2015	Haleakala	Pan-STARRS 1	critical	1.6 km	MPC · JPL
810296	2020 JZ_{12}	—	June 20, 2015	Haleakala	Pan-STARRS 1	·	2.2 km	MPC · JPL
810297	2020 JG_{14}	—	May 1, 2020	Haleakala	Pan-STARRS 1	EOS	1.3 km	MPC · JPL
810298	2020 JQ_{15}	—	April 2, 2020	Haleakala	Pan-STARRS 1	EOS	1.2 km	MPC · JPL
810299	2020 JF_{16}	—	May 15, 2020	Haleakala	Pan-STARRS 1	·	1.6 km	MPC · JPL
810300	2020 JM_{16}	—	May 1, 2020	Haleakala	Pan-STARRS 1	·	2.0 km	MPC · JPL

== 810301–810400 ==
back to top

Designation			Discovery			Properties		Ref
Permanent	Provisional	Named after	Date	Site	Discoverer(s)	Category	Diam.	Ref
810301	2020 JN_{16}	—	May 1, 2020	Haleakala	Pan-STARRS 1	·	2.1 km	MPC · JPL
810302	2020 JA_{18}	—	August 12, 2010	Kitt Peak	Spacewatch	·	1.5 km	MPC · JPL
810303	2020 JO_{21}	—	May 1, 2020	Haleakala	Pan-STARRS 1	·	1.8 km	MPC · JPL
810304	2020 JW_{21}	—	April 23, 2014	Cerro Tololo	DECam	·	2.0 km	MPC · JPL
810305	2020 JU_{22}	—	April 23, 2014	Cerro Tololo	DECam	VER	1.6 km	MPC · JPL
810306	2020 JK_{25}	—	May 15, 2020	Haleakala	Pan-STARRS 1	·	1.7 km	MPC · JPL
810307	2020 JM_{25}	—	May 14, 2020	Haleakala	Pan-STARRS 1	EOS	1.3 km	MPC · JPL
810308	2020 JJ_{28}	—	May 11, 2020	Haleakala	Pan-STARRS 1	·	2.0 km	MPC · JPL
810309	2020 JL_{28}	—	May 15, 2020	Haleakala	Pan-STARRS 1	·	1.6 km	MPC · JPL
810310	2020 JK_{32}	—	May 11, 2020	Haleakala	Pan-STARRS 1	VER	1.8 km	MPC · JPL
810311	2020 JQ_{32}	—	April 25, 2014	Cerro Tololo-DECam	DECam	·	2.3 km	MPC · JPL
810312	2020 JY_{32}	—	May 11, 2020	Haleakala	Pan-STARRS 1	·	1.9 km	MPC · JPL
810313	2020 JZ_{33}	—	May 15, 2020	Haleakala	Pan-STARRS 1	·	2.1 km	MPC · JPL
810314	2020 JP_{34}	—	November 27, 2017	Mount Lemmon	Mount Lemmon Survey	·	1.9 km	MPC · JPL
810315	2020 JE_{40}	—	May 15, 2020	Haleakala	Pan-STARRS 1	·	1.7 km	MPC · JPL
810316	2020 JG_{45}	—	May 11, 2020	Haleakala	Pan-STARRS 1	·	2.4 km	MPC · JPL
810317	2020 JJ_{45}	—	May 15, 2020	Haleakala	Pan-STARRS 1	·	2.1 km	MPC · JPL
810318	2020 JN_{45}	—	May 15, 2020	Haleakala	Pan-STARRS 1	·	2.2 km	MPC · JPL
810319	2020 JZ_{45}	—	May 13, 2020	Haleakala	Pan-STARRS 1	·	2.1 km	MPC · JPL
810320	2020 JA_{46}	—	May 15, 2020	Haleakala	Pan-STARRS 1	·	2.8 km	MPC · JPL
810321	2020 JK_{46}	—	July 9, 2016	Haleakala	Pan-STARRS 1	·	1.6 km	MPC · JPL
810322	2020 JO_{49}	—	May 14, 2020	Haleakala	Pan-STARRS 1	·	1.7 km	MPC · JPL
810323	2020 KN_{9}	—	June 18, 2015	Haleakala	Pan-STARRS 1	·	2.0 km	MPC · JPL
810324	2020 KU_{9}	—	May 17, 2020	Haleakala	Pan-STARRS 1	EOS	1.3 km	MPC · JPL
810325	2020 KD_{10}	—	June 20, 2015	Haleakala	Pan-STARRS 1	·	2.1 km	MPC · JPL
810326	2020 KB_{11}	—	May 20, 2020	Haleakala	Pan-STARRS 1	·	1.7 km	MPC · JPL
810327	2020 KR_{13}	—	September 10, 2015	Haleakala	Pan-STARRS 1	·	2.3 km	MPC · JPL
810328	2020 KB_{14}	—	May 20, 2020	Haleakala	Pan-STARRS 1	EOS	1.4 km	MPC · JPL
810329	2020 KL_{15}	—	October 7, 2016	Kitt Peak	Spacewatch	·	1.7 km	MPC · JPL
810330	2020 KT_{17}	—	May 15, 2020	Haleakala	Pan-STARRS 1	·	1.9 km	MPC · JPL
810331	2020 KZ_{19}	—	May 18, 2020	Haleakala	Pan-STARRS 1	·	1.7 km	MPC · JPL
810332	2020 KD_{23}	—	May 7, 2014	Mount Lemmon	Mount Lemmon Survey	·	2.0 km	MPC · JPL
810333	2020 KG_{24}	—	May 19, 2020	Haleakala	Pan-STARRS 1	·	1.6 km	MPC · JPL
810334	2020 KK_{25}	—	May 27, 2020	Mount Lemmon	Mount Lemmon Survey	LIX	2.3 km	MPC · JPL
810335	2020 KM_{25}	—	May 28, 2020	Haleakala	Pan-STARRS 1	EOS	1.2 km	MPC · JPL
810336	2020 KT_{25}	—	May 31, 2020	Haleakala	Pan-STARRS 1	·	2.0 km	MPC · JPL
810337	2020 KS_{26}	—	May 24, 2020	Haleakala	Pan-STARRS 1	·	1.9 km	MPC · JPL
810338	2020 KT_{26}	—	May 28, 2020	Haleakala	Pan-STARRS 1	·	1.1 km	MPC · JPL
810339	2020 KD_{30}	—	November 28, 2014	Kitt Peak	Spacewatch	L5	6.1 km	MPC · JPL
810340	2020 KE_{33}	—	May 17, 2020	Haleakala	Pan-STARRS 1	·	1.2 km	MPC · JPL
810341	2020 KG_{36}	—	May 26, 2020	Haleakala	Pan-STARRS 1	·	2.1 km	MPC · JPL
810342	2020 KW_{36}	—	February 8, 2019	Palomar Mountain	Zwicky Transient Facility	·	2.2 km	MPC · JPL
810343	2020 KL_{37}	—	August 14, 2016	Haleakala	Pan-STARRS 1	·	1.4 km	MPC · JPL
810344	2020 KP_{37}	—	October 30, 2011	Mount Lemmon	Mount Lemmon Survey	·	1.9 km	MPC · JPL
810345	2020 KQ_{37}	—	May 28, 2020	Haleakala	Pan-STARRS 1	·	2.0 km	MPC · JPL
810346	2020 KU_{37}	—	May 17, 2020	Haleakala	Pan-STARRS 1	·	1.5 km	MPC · JPL
810347	2020 KX_{37}	—	May 24, 2020	Haleakala	Pan-STARRS 2	EOS	1.4 km	MPC · JPL
810348	2020 KV_{38}	—	May 23, 2014	Haleakala	Pan-STARRS 1	·	2.1 km	MPC · JPL
810349	2020 KW_{38}	—	October 24, 2011	Haleakala	Pan-STARRS 1	·	2.1 km	MPC · JPL
810350	2020 KF_{39}	—	May 28, 2020	Haleakala	Pan-STARRS 1	·	1.6 km	MPC · JPL
810351	2020 KH_{39}	—	May 21, 2020	Haleakala	Pan-STARRS 1	·	2.0 km	MPC · JPL
810352	2020 KX_{40}	—	May 20, 2020	Haleakala	Pan-STARRS 1	·	1.8 km	MPC · JPL
810353	2020 KN_{41}	—	May 25, 2020	Mount Lemmon	Mount Lemmon Survey	VER	1.8 km	MPC · JPL
810354	2020 KU_{43}	—	May 24, 2015	Haleakala	Pan-STARRS 1	H	390 m	MPC · JPL
810355	2020 KU_{45}	—	May 21, 2020	Haleakala	Pan-STARRS 1	·	2.1 km	MPC · JPL
810356	2020 KX_{45}	—	May 20, 2020	Haleakala	Pan-STARRS 1	EOS	1.3 km	MPC · JPL
810357	2020 KJ_{46}	—	May 20, 2020	Haleakala	Pan-STARRS 1	AGN	870 m	MPC · JPL
810358	2020 KJ_{51}	—	May 21, 2020	Haleakala	Pan-STARRS 1	·	2.3 km	MPC · JPL
810359	2020 KM_{51}	—	May 28, 2020	Haleakala	Pan-STARRS 1	·	1.9 km	MPC · JPL
810360	2020 KQ_{51}	—	May 18, 2020	Haleakala	Pan-STARRS 1	·	2.4 km	MPC · JPL
810361	2020 KT_{51}	—	May 25, 2020	Mount Lemmon	Mount Lemmon Survey	·	2.1 km	MPC · JPL
810362	2020 KG_{52}	—	May 21, 2020	Haleakala	Pan-STARRS 1	·	2.2 km	MPC · JPL
810363	2020 KY_{61}	—	May 18, 2020	Haleakala	Pan-STARRS 1	·	2.0 km	MPC · JPL
810364	2020 KN_{66}	—	January 12, 2015	Haleakala	Pan-STARRS 1	L5	5.5 km	MPC · JPL
810365	2020 LQ_{11}	—	June 2, 2014	Haleakala	Pan-STARRS 1	·	2.2 km	MPC · JPL
810366	2020 LQ_{13}	—	April 29, 2014	Haleakala	Pan-STARRS 1	VER	2.2 km	MPC · JPL
810367	2020 LA_{14}	—	June 11, 2015	Haleakala	Pan-STARRS 1	NAE	1.6 km	MPC · JPL
810368	2020 LB_{14}	—	June 14, 2020	Haleakala	Pan-STARRS 1	VER	1.7 km	MPC · JPL
810369	2020 LO_{15}	—	June 15, 2020	Haleakala	Pan-STARRS 2	·	1.4 km	MPC · JPL
810370	2020 LW_{17}	—	June 15, 2020	Haleakala	Pan-STARRS 1	·	2.3 km	MPC · JPL
810371	2020 LJ_{20}	—	June 14, 2020	Haleakala	Pan-STARRS 1	·	1.9 km	MPC · JPL
810372	2020 LP_{22}	—	June 14, 2020	Haleakala	Pan-STARRS 1	·	1.2 km	MPC · JPL
810373	2020 LD_{23}	—	June 15, 2020	Haleakala	Pan-STARRS 2	EOS	1.2 km	MPC · JPL
810374	2020 MY_{5}	—	February 5, 2016	Haleakala	Pan-STARRS 1	·	920 m	MPC · JPL
810375	2020 MA_{6}	—	June 1, 2014	Mount Lemmon	Mount Lemmon Survey	T_{j} (2.94)	1.4 km	MPC · JPL
810376	2020 MN_{7}	—	June 29, 2020	Haleakala	Pan-STARRS 1	·	870 m	MPC · JPL
810377	2020 MX_{9}	—	June 17, 2020	Haleakala	Pan-STARRS 1	EOS	1.4 km	MPC · JPL
810378	2020 MZ_{9}	—	June 20, 2020	Pleasant Groves	Holbrook, M.	·	2.2 km	MPC · JPL
810379	2020 MB_{10}	—	April 24, 2019	Haleakala	Pan-STARRS 1	HYG	2.0 km	MPC · JPL
810380	2020 MD_{10}	—	April 30, 2016	Haleakala	Pan-STARRS 1	·	530 m	MPC · JPL
810381	2020 ML_{17}	—	June 20, 2020	Haleakala	Pan-STARRS 1	·	1.8 km	MPC · JPL
810382	2020 MO_{34}	—	April 23, 2014	Cerro Tololo	DECam	·	1.0 km	MPC · JPL
810383	2020 MF_{36}	—	February 17, 2010	Kitt Peak	Spacewatch	·	1.4 km	MPC · JPL
810384	2020 MS_{40}	—	June 21, 2020	Haleakala	Pan-STARRS 1	·	1.4 km	MPC · JPL
810385	2020 MZ_{40}	—	April 29, 2014	Haleakala	Pan-STARRS 1	·	1.9 km	MPC · JPL
810386	2020 MV_{43}	—	April 23, 2014	Cerro Tololo	DECam	TIR	1.6 km	MPC · JPL
810387	2020 MY_{49}	—	July 24, 2015	Haleakala	Pan-STARRS 1	·	1.8 km	MPC · JPL
810388	2020 MY_{50}	—	June 17, 2020	Haleakala	Pan-STARRS 1	L5	5.7 km	MPC · JPL
810389	2020 MC_{51}	—	June 23, 2015	Haleakala	Pan-STARRS 1	·	2.2 km	MPC · JPL
810390	2020 MD_{51}	—	June 21, 2020	Haleakala	Pan-STARRS 1	·	1.9 km	MPC · JPL
810391	2020 MM_{51}	—	June 17, 2020	Haleakala	Pan-STARRS 1	·	1.5 km	MPC · JPL
810392	2020 NU_{7}	—	July 8, 2020	Haleakala	Pan-STARRS 1	·	2.0 km	MPC · JPL
810393	2020 OJ_{6}	—	November 14, 2003	Palomar Mountain	NEAT	·	500 m	MPC · JPL
810394	2020 OO_{13}	—	July 18, 2020	Haleakala	Pan-STARRS 1	·	780 m	MPC · JPL
810395	2020 OK_{39}	—	July 18, 2020	Haleakala	Pan-STARRS 1	·	2.0 km	MPC · JPL
810396	2020 OW_{43}	—	July 18, 2020	Haleakala	Pan-STARRS 1	HOF	1.6 km	MPC · JPL
810397	2020 OB_{91}	—	September 20, 2011	Mount Lemmon	Mount Lemmon Survey	HOF	1.9 km	MPC · JPL
810398	2020 OM_{104}	—	July 18, 2020	Haleakala	Pan-STARRS 1	·	2.7 km	MPC · JPL
810399	2020 OK_{105}	—	January 14, 2018	Haleakala	Pan-STARRS 1	GEF	840 m	MPC · JPL
810400	2020 OL_{111}	—	July 31, 2020	Haleakala	Pan-STARRS 1	·	1.3 km	MPC · JPL

== 810401–810500 ==
back to top

Designation			Discovery			Properties		Ref
Permanent	Provisional	Named after	Date	Site	Discoverer(s)	Category	Diam.	Ref
810401	2020 OF_{139}	—	October 2, 2021	Kitt Peak	Bok NEO Survey	centaur	50 km	MPC · JPL
810402	2020 PR_{49}	—	March 28, 2015	Haleakala	Pan-STARRS 1	ADE	1.1 km	MPC · JPL
810403	2020 PV_{54}	—	August 14, 2020	Haleakala	Pan-STARRS 1	L4	5.0 km	MPC · JPL
810404	2020 PN_{62}	—	August 12, 2020	Haleakala	Pan-STARRS 1	SYL	3.1 km	MPC · JPL
810405	2020 PE_{69}	—	October 21, 2016	Mount Lemmon	Mount Lemmon Survey	·	1.2 km	MPC · JPL
810406	2020 PK_{75}	—	August 15, 2020	Haleakala	Pan-STARRS 1	L4 · HEK	5.3 km	MPC · JPL
810407	2020 PV_{75}	—	August 15, 2020	Haleakala	Pan-STARRS 2	VER	1.8 km	MPC · JPL
810408	2020 PZ_{75}	—	August 12, 2020	Haleakala	Pan-STARRS 1	·	2.4 km	MPC · JPL
810409	2020 PE_{76}	—	May 1, 2016	Cerro Tololo	DECam	L4 · ERY	4.8 km	MPC · JPL
810410	2020 PR_{76}	—	August 12, 2020	Haleakala	Pan-STARRS 1	·	1.3 km	MPC · JPL
810411	2020 PD_{83}	—	August 12, 2020	Haleakala	Pan-STARRS 1	EOS	1.4 km	MPC · JPL
810412	2020 PX_{93}	—	April 18, 2015	Cerro Tololo	DECam	L4 · ERY	5.0 km	MPC · JPL
810413	2020 PA_{97}	—	August 14, 2020	Haleakala	Pan-STARRS 1	·	1.7 km	MPC · JPL
810414	2020 PU_{116}	—	August 11, 2020	Haleakala	Pan-STARRS 1	·	1.1 km	MPC · JPL
810415	2020 QW_{14}	—	August 19, 2020	Haleakala	Pan-STARRS 2	EOS	1.5 km	MPC · JPL
810416	2020 QQ_{15}	—	August 18, 2020	Mount Lemmon	Mount Lemmon Survey	·	600 m	MPC · JPL
810417	2020 QF_{27}	—	April 18, 2015	Cerro Tololo	DECam	L4	5.9 km	MPC · JPL
810418	2020 QH_{31}	—	August 29, 2020	Mount Lemmon	Mount Lemmon Survey	PHO	710 m	MPC · JPL
810419	2020 QJ_{31}	—	August 23, 2020	Haleakala	Pan-STARRS 1	·	900 m	MPC · JPL
810420	2020 QE_{50}	—	August 23, 2020	Haleakala	Pan-STARRS 1	AGN	840 m	MPC · JPL
810421	2020 QS_{50}	—	August 23, 2020	Haleakala	Pan-STARRS 1	AGN	890 m	MPC · JPL
810422	2020 QW_{66}	—	August 22, 2020	Haleakala	Pan-STARRS 1	L4	6.0 km	MPC · JPL
810423	2020 QA_{82}	—	May 2, 2019	Haleakala	Pan-STARRS 1	·	1.1 km	MPC · JPL
810424	2020 QJ_{83}	—	August 17, 2020	Haleakala	Pan-STARRS 1	·	2.1 km	MPC · JPL
810425	2020 QP_{84}	—	August 23, 2020	Haleakala	Pan-STARRS 1	L4	5.4 km	MPC · JPL
810426	2020 QW_{95}	—	March 4, 2006	Kitt Peak	Spacewatch	·	1.0 km	MPC · JPL
810427	2020 QS_{106}	—	October 25, 2016	Haleakala	Pan-STARRS 1	·	1.5 km	MPC · JPL
810428	2020 RC_{38}	—	October 15, 2015	Haleakala	Pan-STARRS 1	·	1.4 km	MPC · JPL
810429	2020 RJ_{53}	—	September 9, 2020	Haleakala	Pan-STARRS 1	AGN	850 m	MPC · JPL
810430	2020 RX_{55}	—	April 18, 2015	Cerro Tololo	DECam	L4	6.8 km	MPC · JPL
810431	2020 RV_{96}	—	August 28, 2019	Haleakala	Pan-STARRS 1	L4	5.0 km	MPC · JPL
810432	2020 RP_{101}	—	April 18, 2015	Cerro Tololo	DECam	L4	5.6 km	MPC · JPL
810433	2020 RU_{103}	—	March 25, 2015	Haleakala	Pan-STARRS 1	L4	6.3 km	MPC · JPL
810434	2020 RW_{104}	—	September 9, 2020	Haleakala	Pan-STARRS 1	·	1.2 km	MPC · JPL
810435	2020 RM_{116}	—	August 1, 2016	Haleakala	Pan-STARRS 1	HNS	660 m	MPC · JPL
810436	2020 RD_{117}	—	September 9, 2020	Haleakala	Pan-STARRS 1	L4	6.6 km	MPC · JPL
810437	2020 RB_{118}	—	July 29, 2020	Haleakala	Pan-STARRS 1	L4	5.6 km	MPC · JPL
810438	2020 RO_{118}	—	April 18, 2015	Cerro Tololo	DECam	L4	5.1 km	MPC · JPL
810439	2020 RB_{119}	—	March 23, 2015	Kitt Peak	L. H. Wasserman, M. W. Buie	L4	4.8 km	MPC · JPL
810440	2020 RV_{119}	—	September 12, 2020	Haleakala	Pan-STARRS 1	L4	5.0 km	MPC · JPL
810441	2020 RL_{123}	—	April 29, 2014	Cerro Tololo	DECam	·	1.3 km	MPC · JPL
810442	2020 RH_{124}	—	September 14, 2020	Haleakala	Pan-STARRS 1	·	1.2 km	MPC · JPL
810443	2020 RX_{124}	—	September 13, 2020	Haleakala	Pan-STARRS 1	·	1.2 km	MPC · JPL
810444	2020 RS_{127}	—	September 13, 2020	Haleakala	Pan-STARRS 1	L4	5.4 km	MPC · JPL
810445	2020 RC_{128}	—	December 22, 2016	Haleakala	Pan-STARRS 1	·	1.1 km	MPC · JPL
810446	2020 RT_{129}	—	September 15, 2020	Haleakala	Pan-STARRS 1	L4	5.9 km	MPC · JPL
810447	2020 RH_{161}	—	March 12, 2005	Kitt Peak	Spacewatch	·	1.2 km	MPC · JPL
810448	2020 SG_{22}	—	September 18, 2020	Haleakala	Pan-STARRS 1	L4	6.8 km	MPC · JPL
810449	2020 SB_{23}	—	September 19, 2020	Haleakala	Pan-STARRS 1	·	2.4 km	MPC · JPL
810450	2020 SD_{35}	—	September 28, 2020	Haleakala	Pan-STARRS 1	·	1.5 km	MPC · JPL
810451	2020 SL_{36}	—	September 17, 2020	Haleakala	Pan-STARRS 1	·	950 m	MPC · JPL
810452	2020 SA_{39}	—	September 26, 2020	Mount Lemmon	Mount Lemmon Survey	·	860 m	MPC · JPL
810453	2020 SB_{47}	—	March 21, 2017	Haleakala	Pan-STARRS 1	·	2.0 km	MPC · JPL
810454	2020 SP_{60}	—	June 17, 2013	Cerro Tololo-DECam	DECam	EOS	1.3 km	MPC · JPL
810455	2020 SF_{63}	—	April 18, 2015	Cerro Tololo	DECam	L4	5.1 km	MPC · JPL
810456	2020 SZ_{64}	—	January 27, 2017	Haleakala	Pan-STARRS 1	·	2.0 km	MPC · JPL
810457	2020 SM_{65}	—	August 7, 2018	Haleakala	Pan-STARRS 1	L4	6.0 km	MPC · JPL
810458	2020 SA_{73}	—	September 19, 2020	Mount Lemmon	Mount Lemmon Survey	L4	5.9 km	MPC · JPL
810459	2020 SD_{73}	—	September 18, 2020	Mount Lemmon	Mount Lemmon Survey	L4	6.1 km	MPC · JPL
810460	2020 SH_{77}	—	September 17, 2020	Haleakala	Pan-STARRS 1	·	1.4 km	MPC · JPL
810461	2020 SF_{80}	—	September 20, 2020	Mount Lemmon	Mount Lemmon Survey	·	890 m	MPC · JPL
810462	2020 SG_{80}	—	September 17, 2020	Haleakala	Pan-STARRS 2	·	1.9 km	MPC · JPL
810463	2020 SK_{80}	—	September 26, 2020	Haleakala	Pan-STARRS 1	·	860 m	MPC · JPL
810464	2020 SK_{83}	—	September 20, 2020	Mount Lemmon	Mount Lemmon Survey	·	1.9 km	MPC · JPL
810465	2020 SQ_{83}	—	September 27, 2020	Haleakala	Pan-STARRS 1	·	1.4 km	MPC · JPL
810466	2020 SU_{83}	—	September 25, 2020	Mount Lemmon	Mount Lemmon Survey	L4	6.8 km	MPC · JPL
810467	2020 SH_{84}	—	April 18, 2015	Cerro Tololo	DECam	L4	5.3 km	MPC · JPL
810468	2020 SM_{87}	—	April 23, 2014	Cerro Tololo	DECam	·	950 m	MPC · JPL
810469	2020 SU_{90}	—	September 23, 2020	Mount Lemmon	Mount Lemmon Survey	MAS	450 m	MPC · JPL
810470	2020 SL_{100}	—	September 26, 2020	Haleakala	Pan-STARRS 1	HOF	1.8 km	MPC · JPL
810471	2020 SS_{108}	—	September 18, 2020	Haleakala	Pan-STARRS 1	L4	4.9 km	MPC · JPL
810472	2020 SV_{108}	—	September 17, 2020	Haleakala	Pan-STARRS 1	L4	5.4 km	MPC · JPL
810473	2020 SU_{110}	—	September 17, 2020	Haleakala	Pan-STARRS 1	·	2.2 km	MPC · JPL
810474	2020 TG_{17}	—	October 14, 2020	Mount Lemmon	Mount Lemmon Survey	·	1.1 km	MPC · JPL
810475	2020 TH_{18}	—	October 21, 2012	Kitt Peak	Spacewatch	·	900 m	MPC · JPL
810476	2020 TM_{23}	—	October 15, 2020	Haleakala	Pan-STARRS 1	·	2.3 km	MPC · JPL
810477	2020 TS_{23}	—	October 13, 2020	Mount Lemmon	Mount Lemmon Survey	·	1.3 km	MPC · JPL
810478	2020 TU_{23}	—	October 14, 2020	Mount Lemmon	Mount Lemmon Survey	WIT	740 m	MPC · JPL
810479	2020 TB_{26}	—	October 15, 2020	Haleakala	Pan-STARRS 1	·	1.2 km	MPC · JPL
810480	2020 TT_{26}	—	April 28, 2014	Cerro Tololo	DECam	·	1.2 km	MPC · JPL
810481	2020 TV_{27}	—	October 14, 2020	Haleakala	Pan-STARRS 2	·	1.4 km	MPC · JPL
810482	2020 TG_{29}	—	October 12, 2020	Mount Lemmon	Mount Lemmon Survey	EUN	750 m	MPC · JPL
810483	2020 TE_{55}	—	October 15, 2007	Mount Lemmon	Mount Lemmon Survey	(260)	2.7 km	MPC · JPL
810484	2020 TY_{67}	—	October 12, 2020	Mount Lemmon	Mount Lemmon Survey	·	1.2 km	MPC · JPL
810485	2020 TT_{72}	—	October 7, 2020	Mount Lemmon	Mount Lemmon Survey	AGN	860 m	MPC · JPL
810486	2020 TV_{72}	—	April 29, 2014	Haleakala	Pan-STARRS 1	·	1.3 km	MPC · JPL
810487	2020 TE_{75}	—	May 21, 2015	Cerro Tololo	DECam	(5)	580 m	MPC · JPL
810488	2020 TK_{76}	—	October 14, 2020	Haleakala	Pan-STARRS 1	·	1.1 km	MPC · JPL
810489	2020 TY_{76}	—	October 15, 2020	Haleakala	Pan-STARRS 1	·	1.4 km	MPC · JPL
810490	2020 TL_{77}	—	May 7, 2014	Haleakala	Pan-STARRS 1	·	1.4 km	MPC · JPL
810491	2020 TV_{77}	—	October 15, 2009	Mount Lemmon	Mount Lemmon Survey	L4	5.2 km	MPC · JPL
810492	2020 TY_{79}	—	October 12, 2020	Mount Lemmon	Mount Lemmon Survey	·	820 m	MPC · JPL
810493	2020 TH_{82}	—	October 15, 2020	Mount Lemmon	Mount Lemmon Survey	·	770 m	MPC · JPL
810494	2020 TJ_{93}	—	October 11, 2020	Mount Lemmon	Mount Lemmon Survey	·	1.1 km	MPC · JPL
810495	2020 UA_{8}	—	January 26, 2017	Haleakala	Pan-STARRS 1	·	1.2 km	MPC · JPL
810496	2020 UT_{9}	—	October 20, 2020	Haleakala	Pan-STARRS 1	·	790 m	MPC · JPL
810497	2020 UE_{10}	—	October 22, 2020	Haleakala	Pan-STARRS 1	·	530 m	MPC · JPL
810498	2020 UM_{10}	—	October 23, 2020	Mount Lemmon	Mount Lemmon Survey	·	1.7 km	MPC · JPL
810499	2020 UG_{11}	—	October 16, 2020	Mount Lemmon	Mount Lemmon Survey	·	1.0 km	MPC · JPL
810500	2020 UH_{12}	—	October 22, 2020	Haleakala	Pan-STARRS 1	EOS	1.2 km	MPC · JPL

== 810501–810600 ==
back to top

Designation			Discovery			Properties		Ref
Permanent	Provisional	Named after	Date	Site	Discoverer(s)	Category	Diam.	Ref
810501	2020 UE_{39}	—	October 23, 2020	Mount Lemmon	Mount Lemmon Survey	·	1.6 km	MPC · JPL
810502	2020 UJ_{40}	—	October 20, 2020	Haleakala	Pan-STARRS 1	·	1.1 km	MPC · JPL
810503	2020 UX_{42}	—	October 20, 2020	Haleakala	Pan-STARRS 1	·	820 m	MPC · JPL
810504	2020 UL_{47}	—	October 17, 2020	Mount Lemmon	Mount Lemmon Survey	·	770 m	MPC · JPL
810505	2020 UP_{49}	—	October 25, 2020	Haleakala	Pan-STARRS 1	·	1.1 km	MPC · JPL
810506	2020 UD_{50}	—	October 20, 2020	Haleakala	Pan-STARRS 1	·	1.1 km	MPC · JPL
810507	2020 UP_{51}	—	October 22, 2020	Haleakala	Pan-STARRS 2	EUN	840 m	MPC · JPL
810508	2020 UJ_{53}	—	October 23, 2020	Mount Lemmon	Mount Lemmon Survey	·	1.5 km	MPC · JPL
810509	2020 UE_{54}	—	October 23, 2020	Mount Lemmon	Mount Lemmon Survey	·	850 m	MPC · JPL
810510	2020 UZ_{54}	—	October 20, 2020	Haleakala	Pan-STARRS 1	·	1.2 km	MPC · JPL
810511	2020 UB_{57}	—	October 22, 2020	Haleakala	Pan-STARRS 1	·	1.4 km	MPC · JPL
810512	2020 UB_{58}	—	September 22, 2008	Kitt Peak	Spacewatch	·	2.1 km	MPC · JPL
810513	2020 UV_{64}	—	October 23, 2020	Haleakala	Pan-STARRS 1	L4	5.5 km	MPC · JPL
810514	2020 UX_{66}	—	October 20, 2020	Haleakala	Pan-STARRS 1	·	810 m	MPC · JPL
810515	2020 UQ_{67}	—	October 16, 2009	Mount Lemmon	Mount Lemmon Survey	·	1.7 km	MPC · JPL
810516	2020 VQ_{7}	—	November 15, 2020	Palomar Mountain	Zwicky Transient Facility	·	1.3 km	MPC · JPL
810517	2020 VK_{17}	—	November 13, 2020	Haleakala	Pan-STARRS 1	AGN	910 m	MPC · JPL
810518	2020 VL_{24}	—	November 11, 2020	Mount Lemmon	Mount Lemmon Survey	·	1.1 km	MPC · JPL
810519	2020 VD_{25}	—	November 11, 2020	Mount Lemmon	Mount Lemmon Survey	·	1.1 km	MPC · JPL
810520	2020 VN_{26}	—	November 15, 2020	Mount Lemmon	Mount Lemmon Survey	·	1.2 km	MPC · JPL
810521	2020 VJ_{30}	—	November 11, 2020	Mount Lemmon	Mount Lemmon Survey	·	2.2 km	MPC · JPL
810522	2020 WB_{11}	—	November 16, 2020	Mount Lemmon	Mount Lemmon Survey	·	1.4 km	MPC · JPL
810523	2020 WO_{13}	—	December 13, 2015	Haleakala	Pan-STARRS 1	·	1.8 km	MPC · JPL
810524	2020 WY_{14}	—	November 23, 2020	Mount Lemmon	Mount Lemmon Survey	·	1.9 km	MPC · JPL
810525	2020 WW_{16}	—	November 23, 2020	Mount Lemmon	Mount Lemmon Survey	·	900 m	MPC · JPL
810526	2020 WP_{19}	—	November 16, 2020	Haleakala	Pan-STARRS 1	·	1.5 km	MPC · JPL
810527	2020 WW_{19}	—	November 16, 2020	Haleakala	Pan-STARRS 1	·	1.5 km	MPC · JPL
810528	2020 WC_{21}	—	February 21, 2013	Haleakala	Pan-STARRS 1	ADE	1.5 km	MPC · JPL
810529	2020 WK_{22}	—	November 16, 2020	Mount Lemmon	Mount Lemmon Survey	·	1.3 km	MPC · JPL
810530	2020 WZ_{28}	—	November 23, 2020	Mount Lemmon	Mount Lemmon Survey	·	1.3 km	MPC · JPL
810531	2020 XS_{11}	—	December 12, 2020	Haleakala	Pan-STARRS 1	·	1.1 km	MPC · JPL
810532	2020 XK_{17}	—	April 28, 2011	Mount Lemmon	Mount Lemmon Survey	·	2.4 km	MPC · JPL
810533	2020 XB_{21}	—	December 7, 2020	Haleakala	Pan-STARRS 1	·	1.3 km	MPC · JPL
810534	2020 YK_{18}	—	December 22, 2020	Haleakala	Pan-STARRS 1	·	750 m	MPC · JPL
810535	2020 YQ_{19}	—	October 3, 2019	Mount Lemmon	Mount Lemmon Survey	·	1.6 km	MPC · JPL
810536	2020 YM_{20}	—	January 10, 2014	Mount Lemmon	Mount Lemmon Survey	·	530 m	MPC · JPL
810537	2020 YV_{24}	—	December 24, 2020	Haleakala	Pan-STARRS 1	HNS	780 m	MPC · JPL
810538	2020 YH_{35}	—	September 29, 2019	Haleakala	Pan-STARRS 1	·	900 m	MPC · JPL
810539	2021 AJ_{22}	—	January 7, 2021	Haleakala	Pan-STARRS 1	·	1.4 km	MPC · JPL
810540	2021 AS_{23}	—	April 1, 2017	Haleakala	Pan-STARRS 1	·	1.3 km	MPC · JPL
810541	2021 AD_{27}	—	December 20, 2014	Haleakala	Pan-STARRS 1	·	2.1 km	MPC · JPL
810542	2021 AP_{27}	—	January 7, 2021	Haleakala	Pan-STARRS 1	·	2.0 km	MPC · JPL
810543	2021 AE_{30}	—	January 7, 2021	Haleakala	Pan-STARRS 1	·	1.3 km	MPC · JPL
810544	2021 AF_{30}	—	January 7, 2021	Haleakala	Pan-STARRS 1	·	880 m	MPC · JPL
810545	2021 BU_{6}	—	March 11, 2016	Haleakala	Pan-STARRS 1	·	1.8 km	MPC · JPL
810546	2021 BG_{10}	—	December 11, 2009	Mount Lemmon	Mount Lemmon Survey	·	1.5 km	MPC · JPL
810547	2021 BH_{10}	—	January 17, 2021	Mount Lemmon	Mount Lemmon Survey	·	1.0 km	MPC · JPL
810548	2021 BB_{11}	—	January 22, 2021	Mount Lemmon	Mount Lemmon Survey	·	1.3 km	MPC · JPL
810549	2021 CJ_{5}	—	August 10, 2015	Haleakala	Pan-STARRS 1	·	960 m	MPC · JPL
810550	2021 CB_{18}	—	December 21, 2014	Haleakala	Pan-STARRS 1	·	2.3 km	MPC · JPL
810551	2021 CM_{21}	—	January 27, 2007	Kitt Peak	Spacewatch	·	1.3 km	MPC · JPL
810552	2021 CX_{21}	—	February 11, 2021	Haleakala	Pan-STARRS 1	·	960 m	MPC · JPL
810553	2021 CM_{22}	—	February 8, 2021	Mount Lemmon	Mount Lemmon Survey	BAR	630 m	MPC · JPL
810554	2021 CR_{22}	—	February 11, 2021	Haleakala	Pan-STARRS 1	·	670 m	MPC · JPL
810555	2021 CF_{23}	—	February 9, 2021	Mount Lemmon	Mount Lemmon Survey	·	930 m	MPC · JPL
810556	2021 CC_{24}	—	February 6, 2021	Mount Lemmon	Mount Lemmon Survey	·	2.0 km	MPC · JPL
810557	2021 CF_{24}	—	February 7, 2021	Haleakala	Pan-STARRS 1	HOF	1.7 km	MPC · JPL
810558	2021 CN_{24}	—	February 11, 2021	Haleakala	Pan-STARRS 1	EUN	760 m	MPC · JPL
810559	2021 CR_{35}	—	February 12, 2021	Haleakala	Pan-STARRS 1	·	1.3 km	MPC · JPL
810560	2021 CG_{36}	—	February 13, 2021	Haleakala	Pan-STARRS 2	·	2.1 km	MPC · JPL
810561	2021 CH_{36}	—	February 12, 2021	Haleakala	Pan-STARRS 1	EOS	1.4 km	MPC · JPL
810562	2021 CO_{40}	—	February 7, 2021	Haleakala	Pan-STARRS 1	·	1.9 km	MPC · JPL
810563	2021 CU_{40}	—	February 8, 2021	Haleakala	Pan-STARRS 1	·	1.8 km	MPC · JPL
810564	2021 CJ_{49}	—	February 7, 2021	Haleakala	Pan-STARRS 1	THM	1.7 km	MPC · JPL
810565	2021 CN_{49}	—	February 5, 2021	Mount Lemmon	Mount Lemmon Survey	KOR	910 m	MPC · JPL
810566	2021 CZ_{51}	—	February 12, 2021	Haleakala	Pan-STARRS 1	·	1.3 km	MPC · JPL
810567	2021 CZ_{55}	—	January 20, 2015	Mount Lemmon	Mount Lemmon Survey	·	2.1 km	MPC · JPL
810568	2021 CN_{57}	—	February 7, 2021	Haleakala	Pan-STARRS 1	·	1.4 km	MPC · JPL
810569	2021 CP_{57}	—	February 7, 2021	Haleakala	Pan-STARRS 1	·	2.0 km	MPC · JPL
810570	2021 CE_{58}	—	January 3, 2016	Haleakala	Pan-STARRS 1	·	1.2 km	MPC · JPL
810571	2021 CL_{60}	—	December 21, 2014	Haleakala	Pan-STARRS 1	·	1.9 km	MPC · JPL
810572	2021 DY_{2}	—	October 1, 2005	Mount Lemmon	Mount Lemmon Survey	·	1.2 km	MPC · JPL
810573	2021 DP_{3}	—	September 13, 2017	Haleakala	Pan-STARRS 1	·	2.4 km	MPC · JPL
810574	2021 DY_{6}	—	February 16, 2021	Haleakala	Pan-STARRS 1	(5)	730 m	MPC · JPL
810575	2021 DQ_{7}	—	November 27, 2011	Mount Lemmon	Mount Lemmon Survey	·	720 m	MPC · JPL
810576	2021 DM_{10}	—	January 23, 2015	Haleakala	Pan-STARRS 1	·	2.3 km	MPC · JPL
810577	2021 DX_{12}	—	November 1, 2018	Mount Lemmon	Mount Lemmon Survey	VER	2.3 km	MPC · JPL
810578	2021 DC_{16}	—	January 16, 2016	Haleakala	Pan-STARRS 1	·	1.3 km	MPC · JPL
810579	2021 DL_{18}	—	March 31, 2013	Mount Lemmon	Mount Lemmon Survey	MAR	610 m	MPC · JPL
810580	2021 DK_{20}	—	February 17, 2021	Haleakala	Pan-STARRS 2	·	2.6 km	MPC · JPL
810581	2021 DP_{20}	—	February 16, 2021	Haleakala	Pan-STARRS 1	·	2.1 km	MPC · JPL
810582	2021 DS_{20}	—	April 15, 2016	Mount Lemmon	Mount Lemmon Survey	·	2.2 km	MPC · JPL
810583	2021 EY_{5}	—	April 5, 2017	Mount Lemmon	Mount Lemmon Survey	·	780 m	MPC · JPL
810584	2021 EA_{6}	—	February 16, 2010	Mount Lemmon	Mount Lemmon Survey	·	1.8 km	MPC · JPL
810585	2021 EJ_{6}	—	April 7, 2000	Kitt Peak	Spacewatch	·	1.4 km	MPC · JPL
810586	2021 EN_{9}	—	March 15, 2021	Haleakala	Pan-STARRS 2	·	850 m	MPC · JPL
810587	2021 ET_{11}	—	April 24, 2008	Mount Lemmon	Mount Lemmon Survey	·	840 m	MPC · JPL
810588	2021 EJ_{12}	—	March 14, 2013	Mount Lemmon	Mount Lemmon Survey	3:2 · SHU	3.8 km	MPC · JPL
810589	2021 EX_{12}	—	June 26, 2017	Haleakala	Pan-STARRS 1	·	850 m	MPC · JPL
810590	2021 EW_{16}	—	April 3, 2017	Haleakala	Pan-STARRS 1	·	780 m	MPC · JPL
810591	2021 EV_{17}	—	March 15, 2021	Haleakala	Pan-STARRS 1	·	1 km	MPC · JPL
810592	2021 EY_{17}	—	March 15, 2021	Haleakala	Pan-STARRS 2	·	1.1 km	MPC · JPL
810593	2021 EA_{20}	—	May 12, 2013	Mount Lemmon	Mount Lemmon Survey	·	1.0 km	MPC · JPL
810594	2021 EC_{20}	—	March 10, 2021	MAP, San Pedro de	A. Maury, Attard, G.	·	1.1 km	MPC · JPL
810595	2021 EK_{21}	—	March 15, 2021	Haleakala	Pan-STARRS 2	·	1.3 km	MPC · JPL
810596	2021 ES_{22}	—	April 1, 2017	Haleakala	Pan-STARRS 1	·	770 m	MPC · JPL
810597	2021 ET_{22}	—	March 15, 2021	Haleakala	Pan-STARRS 1	·	1.4 km	MPC · JPL
810598	2021 EZ_{22}	—	October 3, 2005	Catalina	CSS	·	1.4 km	MPC · JPL
810599	2021 EE_{23}	—	February 16, 2021	Haleakala	Pan-STARRS 1	·	1.0 km	MPC · JPL
810600	2021 ER_{23}	—	November 26, 2019	Haleakala	Pan-STARRS 1	·	990 m	MPC · JPL

== 810601–810700 ==
back to top

Designation			Discovery			Properties		Ref
Permanent	Provisional	Named after	Date	Site	Discoverer(s)	Category	Diam.	Ref
810601	2021 EG_{25}	—	March 15, 2021	Haleakala	Pan-STARRS 1	·	900 m	MPC · JPL
810602	2021 ER_{25}	—	March 7, 2021	Mount Lemmon	Mount Lemmon Survey	(1547)	850 m	MPC · JPL
810603	2021 ES_{25}	—	March 18, 2004	Kitt Peak	Spacewatch	·	830 m	MPC · JPL
810604	2021 ET_{25}	—	March 15, 2021	Haleakala	Pan-STARRS 1	·	860 m	MPC · JPL
810605	2021 EV_{25}	—	January 2, 2016	Mount Lemmon	Mount Lemmon Survey	·	830 m	MPC · JPL
810606	2021 EQ_{26}	—	March 14, 2012	Mount Lemmon	Mount Lemmon Survey	·	1.2 km	MPC · JPL
810607	2021 EC_{29}	—	April 12, 2016	Haleakala	Pan-STARRS 1	·	1.4 km	MPC · JPL
810608	2021 EB_{33}	—	January 4, 2016	Haleakala	Pan-STARRS 1	·	1.2 km	MPC · JPL
810609	2021 EZ_{34}	—	April 3, 2017	Haleakala	Pan-STARRS 1	·	650 m	MPC · JPL
810610	2021 EX_{37}	—	March 15, 2021	Haleakala	Pan-STARRS 1	(5)	950 m	MPC · JPL
810611	2021 EE_{39}	—	April 15, 2013	Haleakala	Pan-STARRS 1	·	830 m	MPC · JPL
810612	2021 EV_{40}	—	August 5, 2018	Haleakala	Pan-STARRS 1	·	630 m	MPC · JPL
810613	2021 EA_{41}	—	April 3, 2017	Haleakala	Pan-STARRS 1	·	970 m	MPC · JPL
810614	2021 EP_{42}	—	March 15, 2021	Haleakala	Pan-STARRS 1	·	900 m	MPC · JPL
810615	2021 ES_{42}	—	March 30, 2016	Cerro Tololo	DECam	·	1.1 km	MPC · JPL
810616	2021 EZ_{47}	—	September 22, 2012	Mount Lemmon	Mount Lemmon Survey	·	2.0 km	MPC · JPL
810617	2021 EW_{48}	—	March 15, 2021	Haleakala	Pan-STARRS 1	AGN	830 m	MPC · JPL
810618	2021 EG_{50}	—	March 15, 2021	Haleakala	Pan-STARRS 1	·	1.3 km	MPC · JPL
810619 Gaoyu	2021 ED_{52}	Gaoyu	March 6, 2021	Nanshan	X. Liao, X. Gao	·	2.2 km	MPC · JPL
810620	2021 EY_{55}	—	November 17, 2018	Mount Lemmon	Mount Lemmon Survey	EOS	1.3 km	MPC · JPL
810621	2021 FB_{4}	—	March 20, 2021	Haleakala	Pan-STARRS 1	MAR	640 m	MPC · JPL
810622	2021 FL_{5}	—	March 12, 2016	Haleakala	Pan-STARRS 1	·	1.7 km	MPC · JPL
810623	2021 FU_{5}	—	March 20, 2021	Kitt Peak	Bok NEO Survey	BRG	1.0 km	MPC · JPL
810624	2021 FP_{7}	—	April 26, 2017	Haleakala	Pan-STARRS 1	·	1.0 km	MPC · JPL
810625	2021 FU_{7}	—	March 22, 2021	Mount Lemmon	Mount Lemmon Survey	·	940 m	MPC · JPL
810626	2021 FJ_{9}	—	March 23, 2021	Mount Lemmon	Mount Lemmon Survey	·	1.2 km	MPC · JPL
810627	2021 FU_{9}	—	March 17, 2012	Mauna Kea	P. A. Wiegert	·	900 m	MPC · JPL
810628	2021 FT_{10}	—	March 20, 2021	Haleakala	Pan-STARRS 1	·	980 m	MPC · JPL
810629	2021 FP_{11}	—	September 19, 2018	Haleakala	Pan-STARRS 2	EUN	840 m	MPC · JPL
810630	2021 FB_{15}	—	May 21, 2017	Haleakala	Pan-STARRS 1	·	1.1 km	MPC · JPL
810631	2021 FA_{16}	—	March 20, 2021	Mount Lemmon	Mount Lemmon Survey	·	1.4 km	MPC · JPL
810632	2021 FN_{19}	—	October 25, 2014	Mount Lemmon	Mount Lemmon Survey	·	1.1 km	MPC · JPL
810633	2021 FS_{20}	—	March 31, 2016	Haleakala	Pan-STARRS 1	EOS	1.3 km	MPC · JPL
810634	2021 FV_{20}	—	April 1, 2017	Haleakala	Pan-STARRS 1	·	800 m	MPC · JPL
810635	2021 FZ_{21}	—	December 9, 2015	Mount Lemmon	Mount Lemmon Survey	·	840 m	MPC · JPL
810636	2021 FE_{22}	—	April 6, 2017	Mount Lemmon	Mount Lemmon Survey	EUN	680 m	MPC · JPL
810637	2021 FN_{22}	—	March 20, 2021	Haleakala	Pan-STARRS 1	·	870 m	MPC · JPL
810638	2021 FO_{22}	—	March 20, 2021	Mount Lemmon	Mount Lemmon Survey	EUN	790 m	MPC · JPL
810639	2021 FR_{23}	—	March 29, 2017	Haleakala	Pan-STARRS 1	EUN	780 m	MPC · JPL
810640	2021 FG_{24}	—	March 19, 2021	Haleakala	Pan-STARRS 1	·	1.1 km	MPC · JPL
810641	2021 FJ_{26}	—	November 27, 2014	Haleakala	Pan-STARRS 1	·	990 m	MPC · JPL
810642	2021 FM_{26}	—	May 4, 2017	Mount Lemmon	Mount Lemmon Survey	ADE	1.1 km	MPC · JPL
810643	2021 FX_{26}	—	April 27, 2017	Haleakala	Pan-STARRS 1	EUN	810 m	MPC · JPL
810644	2021 FR_{27}	—	February 15, 2016	Mount Lemmon	Mount Lemmon Survey	·	1.2 km	MPC · JPL
810645	2021 FK_{28}	—	March 19, 2017	Haleakala	Pan-STARRS 1	MAR	800 m	MPC · JPL
810646	2021 FL_{30}	—	April 5, 2016	Haleakala	Pan-STARRS 1	·	2.0 km	MPC · JPL
810647	2021 FZ_{30}	—	March 20, 2021	Haleakala	Pan-STARRS 1	·	1.1 km	MPC · JPL
810648	2021 FC_{31}	—	March 20, 2021	Mount Lemmon	Mount Lemmon Survey	·	810 m	MPC · JPL
810649	2021 FF_{33}	—	April 29, 2012	Mount Lemmon	Mount Lemmon Survey	·	1.1 km	MPC · JPL
810650	2021 FP_{34}	—	March 20, 2021	Kitt Peak	Bok NEO Survey	·	750 m	MPC · JPL
810651	2021 FQ_{34}	—	March 23, 2021	Kitt Peak	Bok NEO Survey	·	840 m	MPC · JPL
810652	2021 FJ_{35}	—	December 30, 2007	Kitt Peak	Spacewatch	·	740 m	MPC · JPL
810653	2021 FP_{36}	—	March 25, 2021	Haleakala	Pan-STARRS 1	·	1.0 km	MPC · JPL
810654	2021 FX_{36}	—	March 22, 2021	Mount Lemmon	Mount Lemmon Survey	·	1.0 km	MPC · JPL
810655	2021 FB_{38}	—	March 20, 2021	Kitt Peak	Bok NEO Survey	HNS	710 m	MPC · JPL
810656	2021 FH_{38}	—	March 23, 2021	Kitt Peak	Bok NEO Survey	·	1.2 km	MPC · JPL
810657 ESOC	2021 FE_{40}	ESOC	March 22, 2021	Calar Alto-Schmidt	E. Schwab, Koschny, D.	·	780 m	MPC · JPL
810658	2021 FO_{40}	—	March 20, 2021	Haleakala	Pan-STARRS 1	EUN	840 m	MPC · JPL
810659	2021 FH_{41}	—	March 20, 2021	Haleakala	Pan-STARRS 1	HNS	750 m	MPC · JPL
810660	2021 FE_{42}	—	March 22, 2021	Kitt Peak	Bok NEO Survey	·	1.2 km	MPC · JPL
810661	2021 FQ_{42}	—	March 20, 2021	Mount Lemmon	Mount Lemmon Survey	·	780 m	MPC · JPL
810662	2021 FD_{43}	—	March 18, 2021	Haleakala	Pan-STARRS 1	·	850 m	MPC · JPL
810663	2021 FR_{43}	—	March 22, 2021	Haleakala	Pan-STARRS 1	·	1.1 km	MPC · JPL
810664	2021 FQ_{50}	—	March 20, 2021	Mount Lemmon	Mount Lemmon Survey	·	1.1 km	MPC · JPL
810665	2021 FW_{50}	—	March 20, 2021	Mount Lemmon	Mount Lemmon Survey	·	1.2 km	MPC · JPL
810666	2021 FF_{51}	—	February 10, 2008	Mount Lemmon	Mount Lemmon Survey	MAR	660 m	MPC · JPL
810667	2021 FJ_{51}	—	March 19, 2021	Mount Lemmon	Mount Lemmon Survey	·	830 m	MPC · JPL
810668	2021 FL_{51}	—	June 24, 2017	Haleakala	Pan-STARRS 1	EOS	1.4 km	MPC · JPL
810669	2021 FZ_{51}	—	March 20, 2021	Kitt Peak	Bok NEO Survey	·	1.1 km	MPC · JPL
810670	2021 FS_{52}	—	March 23, 2021	Kitt Peak	Bok NEO Survey	EUN	770 m	MPC · JPL
810671	2021 FC_{53}	—	March 20, 2021	Mount Lemmon	Mount Lemmon Survey	(194)	1.5 km	MPC · JPL
810672	2021 FD_{53}	—	March 20, 2021	Mount Lemmon	Mount Lemmon Survey	·	1.2 km	MPC · JPL
810673	2021 FF_{56}	—	March 20, 2021	Mount Lemmon	Mount Lemmon Survey	HNS	670 m	MPC · JPL
810674	2021 FK_{56}	—	March 20, 2021	Mount Lemmon	Mount Lemmon Survey	EOS	1.3 km	MPC · JPL
810675	2021 FO_{57}	—	October 1, 2013	Mount Lemmon	Mount Lemmon Survey	KOR	870 m	MPC · JPL
810676	2021 FG_{58}	—	March 19, 2021	Haleakala	Pan-STARRS 1	·	1.2 km	MPC · JPL
810677	2021 FG_{61}	—	March 23, 2021	Mount Lemmon	Mount Lemmon Survey	·	750 m	MPC · JPL
810678	2021 GD_{11}	—	January 18, 2016	Mount Lemmon	Mount Lemmon Survey	critical	1.2 km	MPC · JPL
810679	2021 GG_{14}	—	September 18, 2014	Haleakala	Pan-STARRS 1	·	830 m	MPC · JPL
810680	2021 GZ_{14}	—	July 14, 2013	Haleakala	Pan-STARRS 1	·	1.3 km	MPC · JPL
810681	2021 GO_{17}	—	May 12, 2013	Haleakala	Pan-STARRS 1	MAR	610 m	MPC · JPL
810682	2021 GJ_{20}	—	May 22, 2017	Haleakala	Pan-STARRS 1	·	1.1 km	MPC · JPL
810683	2021 GF_{21}	—	April 3, 2021	Haleakala	Pan-STARRS 1	HNS	700 m	MPC · JPL
810684	2021 GL_{21}	—	June 18, 2013	Haleakala	Pan-STARRS 1	EUN	770 m	MPC · JPL
810685	2021 GW_{21}	—	April 4, 2021	Mount Lemmon	Mount Lemmon Survey	·	920 m	MPC · JPL
810686	2021 GG_{22}	—	August 8, 2018	Haleakala	Pan-STARRS 1	·	880 m	MPC · JPL
810687	2021 GL_{23}	—	April 4, 2021	Mount Lemmon	Mount Lemmon Survey	·	1.1 km	MPC · JPL
810688	2021 GT_{24}	—	November 12, 2010	Mount Lemmon	Mount Lemmon Survey	·	1.0 km	MPC · JPL
810689	2021 GL_{25}	—	April 4, 2021	Mount Lemmon	Mount Lemmon Survey	·	800 m	MPC · JPL
810690	2021 GQ_{25}	—	January 4, 2016	Haleakala	Pan-STARRS 1	EUN	700 m	MPC · JPL
810691	2021 GW_{25}	—	March 27, 2017	Haleakala	Pan-STARRS 1	·	760 m	MPC · JPL
810692	2021 GE_{27}	—	April 9, 2021	Mount Lemmon	Mount Lemmon Survey	EUN	830 m	MPC · JPL
810693	2021 GQ_{27}	—	September 13, 2017	Haleakala	Pan-STARRS 1	·	1.9 km	MPC · JPL
810694	2021 GG_{28}	—	November 1, 2005	Mount Lemmon	Mount Lemmon Survey	·	1.4 km	MPC · JPL
810695	2021 GX_{28}	—	April 4, 2021	Mount Lemmon	Mount Lemmon Survey	EUN	730 m	MPC · JPL
810696	2021 GB_{29}	—	January 29, 2016	Mount Lemmon	Mount Lemmon Survey	ADE	1.5 km	MPC · JPL
810697	2021 GX_{30}	—	December 29, 2014	Haleakala	Pan-STARRS 1	·	1.5 km	MPC · JPL
810698	2021 GH_{31}	—	April 16, 2016	Haleakala	Pan-STARRS 1	·	1.4 km	MPC · JPL
810699	2021 GR_{31}	—	May 21, 2017	Haleakala	Pan-STARRS 1	·	1.1 km	MPC · JPL
810700	2021 GH_{32}	—	May 30, 2016	Haleakala	Pan-STARRS 1	·	1.8 km	MPC · JPL

== 810701–810800 ==
back to top

Designation			Discovery			Properties		Ref
Permanent	Provisional	Named after	Date	Site	Discoverer(s)	Category	Diam.	Ref
810701	2021 GY_{32}	—	October 15, 2015	Haleakala	Pan-STARRS 1	·	840 m	MPC · JPL
810702	2021 GW_{34}	—	February 16, 2012	Haleakala	Pan-STARRS 1	·	1.1 km	MPC · JPL
810703	2021 GF_{35}	—	April 6, 2021	Haleakala	Pan-STARRS 2	·	850 m	MPC · JPL
810704	2021 GV_{35}	—	March 5, 2008	Mount Lemmon	Mount Lemmon Survey	·	920 m	MPC · JPL
810705	2021 GC_{36}	—	January 11, 2016	Haleakala	Pan-STARRS 1	·	1.4 km	MPC · JPL
810706	2021 GD_{37}	—	November 5, 2019	Mount Lemmon	Mount Lemmon Survey	·	740 m	MPC · JPL
810707	2021 GF_{37}	—	October 18, 2014	Mount Lemmon	Mount Lemmon Survey	·	900 m	MPC · JPL
810708	2021 GW_{38}	—	April 4, 2021	Mount Lemmon	Mount Lemmon Survey	·	2.0 km	MPC · JPL
810709	2021 GM_{39}	—	April 4, 2021	Mount Lemmon	Mount Lemmon Survey	·	890 m	MPC · JPL
810710	2021 GG_{40}	—	April 6, 2021	Haleakala	Pan-STARRS 1	·	970 m	MPC · JPL
810711	2021 GW_{40}	—	April 2, 2021	Haleakala	Pan-STARRS 1	·	1.4 km	MPC · JPL
810712	2021 GJ_{42}	—	July 1, 2013	Haleakala	Pan-STARRS 1	·	880 m	MPC · JPL
810713	2021 GC_{44}	—	April 7, 2021	Haleakala	Pan-STARRS 1	·	930 m	MPC · JPL
810714	2021 GT_{44}	—	March 26, 2008	Mount Lemmon	Mount Lemmon Survey	·	870 m	MPC · JPL
810715	2021 GJ_{45}	—	April 13, 2021	Haleakala	Pan-STARRS 1	·	820 m	MPC · JPL
810716	2021 GW_{45}	—	August 1, 2017	Haleakala	Pan-STARRS 1	·	2.0 km	MPC · JPL
810717	2021 GF_{47}	—	January 7, 2016	Haleakala	Pan-STARRS 1	·	1.2 km	MPC · JPL
810718	2021 GX_{47}	—	November 17, 2018	Mount Lemmon	Mount Lemmon Survey	·	1.0 km	MPC · JPL
810719	2021 GS_{49}	—	April 11, 2021	Kitt Peak	Bok NEO Survey	KON	1.6 km	MPC · JPL
810720	2021 GA_{50}	—	February 16, 2015	Haleakala	Pan-STARRS 1	·	2.1 km	MPC · JPL
810721	2021 GL_{50}	—	March 6, 2008	Mount Lemmon	Mount Lemmon Survey	·	900 m	MPC · JPL
810722	2021 GR_{50}	—	August 31, 2005	Palomar Mountain	NEAT	·	960 m	MPC · JPL
810723	2021 GG_{51}	—	February 19, 2015	Cerro Tololo-DECam	DECam	·	1.2 km	MPC · JPL
810724	2021 GB_{52}	—	January 21, 2015	Haleakala	Pan-STARRS 1	URS	2.4 km	MPC · JPL
810725	2021 GH_{55}	—	May 19, 2017	Haleakala	Pan-STARRS 1	·	900 m	MPC · JPL
810726	2021 GK_{55}	—	February 3, 2016	Haleakala	Pan-STARRS 1	·	1.5 km	MPC · JPL
810727	2021 GO_{55}	—	May 16, 2013	Haleakala	Pan-STARRS 1	·	1.1 km	MPC · JPL
810728	2021 GU_{55}	—	April 2, 2021	Haleakala	Pan-STARRS 1	·	980 m	MPC · JPL
810729	2021 GQ_{56}	—	April 13, 2021	Haleakala	Pan-STARRS 1	·	930 m	MPC · JPL
810730	2021 GV_{56}	—	March 16, 2012	Mount Lemmon	Mount Lemmon Survey	·	940 m	MPC · JPL
810731	2021 GE_{58}	—	January 4, 2016	Haleakala	Pan-STARRS 1	·	890 m	MPC · JPL
810732	2021 GX_{59}	—	January 23, 2020	Haleakala	Pan-STARRS 1	·	1.9 km	MPC · JPL
810733	2021 GR_{61}	—	April 4, 2021	Mount Lemmon	Mount Lemmon Survey	·	1.3 km	MPC · JPL
810734	2021 GM_{62}	—	April 9, 2021	Haleakala	Pan-STARRS 1	·	1.1 km	MPC · JPL
810735	2021 GG_{63}	—	April 14, 2021	Haleakala	Pan-STARRS 1	·	1.0 km	MPC · JPL
810736	2021 GK_{63}	—	April 7, 2021	Haleakala	Pan-STARRS 1	·	1.2 km	MPC · JPL
810737	2021 GX_{63}	—	August 18, 2017	Haleakala	Pan-STARRS 1	·	1.5 km	MPC · JPL
810738	2021 GD_{64}	—	April 4, 2008	Kitt Peak	Spacewatch	·	1.1 km	MPC · JPL
810739	2021 GZ_{64}	—	April 9, 2021	Haleakala	Pan-STARRS 1	·	1.4 km	MPC · JPL
810740	2021 GG_{66}	—	November 23, 2014	Haleakala	Pan-STARRS 1	·	1.1 km	MPC · JPL
810741	2021 GT_{68}	—	February 6, 2016	Haleakala	Pan-STARRS 1	·	1.0 km	MPC · JPL
810742	2021 GC_{69}	—	April 6, 2008	Mount Lemmon	Mount Lemmon Survey	·	1.2 km	MPC · JPL
810743	2021 GL_{69}	—	August 17, 2009	Mauna Kea	P. A. Wiegert	·	850 m	MPC · JPL
810744	2021 GO_{70}	—	April 9, 2021	Haleakala	Pan-STARRS 1	·	1.0 km	MPC · JPL
810745	2021 GS_{71}	—	April 8, 2021	Haleakala	Pan-STARRS 1	·	1.1 km	MPC · JPL
810746	2021 GG_{73}	—	October 25, 2017	Mount Lemmon	Mount Lemmon Survey	·	2.4 km	MPC · JPL
810747	2021 GO_{73}	—	April 3, 2017	Haleakala	Pan-STARRS 1	·	860 m	MPC · JPL
810748	2021 GN_{74}	—	April 15, 2021	Haleakala	Pan-STARRS 1	·	940 m	MPC · JPL
810749	2021 GT_{74}	—	April 26, 2017	Haleakala	Pan-STARRS 1	·	730 m	MPC · JPL
810750	2021 GQ_{77}	—	January 1, 2012	Mount Lemmon	Mount Lemmon Survey	(1547)	870 m	MPC · JPL
810751	2021 GG_{84}	—	April 10, 2021	Mount Lemmon	Mount Lemmon Survey	·	890 m	MPC · JPL
810752	2021 GH_{84}	—	April 29, 2012	Kitt Peak	Spacewatch	·	940 m	MPC · JPL
810753	2021 GT_{84}	—	April 10, 2021	Haleakala	Pan-STARRS 1	·	1.2 km	MPC · JPL
810754	2021 GC_{85}	—	January 22, 2015	Haleakala	Pan-STARRS 1	·	1.4 km	MPC · JPL
810755	2021 GH_{85}	—	February 11, 2016	Haleakala	Pan-STARRS 1	·	1.0 km	MPC · JPL
810756	2021 GD_{87}	—	April 6, 2021	Haleakala	Pan-STARRS 1	VER	1.9 km	MPC · JPL
810757	2021 GZ_{88}	—	October 17, 2018	Haleakala	Pan-STARRS 2	·	1.3 km	MPC · JPL
810758	2021 GS_{89}	—	April 6, 2021	Haleakala	Pan-STARRS 1	·	760 m	MPC · JPL
810759	2021 GG_{90}	—	January 28, 2015	Haleakala	Pan-STARRS 1	·	1.8 km	MPC · JPL
810760	2021 GL_{90}	—	April 7, 2021	Haleakala	Pan-STARRS 1	·	800 m	MPC · JPL
810761	2021 GJ_{91}	—	April 9, 2021	Mount Lemmon	Mount Lemmon Survey	EUN	890 m	MPC · JPL
810762	2021 GM_{91}	—	April 4, 2021	Mount Lemmon	Mount Lemmon Survey	T_{j} (2.98)	1.9 km	MPC · JPL
810763	2021 GQ_{91}	—	January 25, 2015	Haleakala	Pan-STARRS 1	·	1.7 km	MPC · JPL
810764	2021 GS_{91}	—	April 6, 2021	Haleakala	Pan-STARRS 1	·	1.2 km	MPC · JPL
810765	2021 GZ_{98}	—	April 13, 2021	Haleakala	Pan-STARRS 1	·	880 m	MPC · JPL
810766	2021 GK_{101}	—	January 21, 2020	Haleakala	Pan-STARRS 1	·	1.2 km	MPC · JPL
810767	2021 GO_{102}	—	April 4, 2021	Mount Lemmon	Mount Lemmon Survey	·	1.0 km	MPC · JPL
810768	2021 GQ_{102}	—	December 17, 2007	Kitt Peak	Spacewatch	·	730 m	MPC · JPL
810769	2021 GX_{108}	—	April 7, 2021	Haleakala	Pan-STARRS 1	·	880 m	MPC · JPL
810770	2021 GD_{109}	—	January 20, 2015	Haleakala	Pan-STARRS 1	THM	1.6 km	MPC · JPL
810771	2021 GK_{109}	—	April 6, 2021	Haleakala	Pan-STARRS 1	HNS	870 m	MPC · JPL
810772	2021 GH_{110}	—	April 10, 2021	Haleakala	Pan-STARRS 1	ADE	1.4 km	MPC · JPL
810773	2021 GM_{110}	—	November 26, 2019	Haleakala	Pan-STARRS 1	·	960 m	MPC · JPL
810774	2021 GN_{110}	—	May 3, 2000	Kitt Peak	Spacewatch	·	840 m	MPC · JPL
810775	2021 GB_{111}	—	April 15, 2021	Haleakala	Pan-STARRS 1	·	1.7 km	MPC · JPL
810776	2021 GP_{111}	—	April 10, 2021	Haleakala	Pan-STARRS 1	MRX	780 m	MPC · JPL
810777	2021 GO_{112}	—	May 14, 2008	Mount Lemmon	Mount Lemmon Survey	EUN	690 m	MPC · JPL
810778	2021 GM_{113}	—	April 10, 2021	Haleakala	Pan-STARRS 1	·	830 m	MPC · JPL
810779	2021 GR_{113}	—	April 7, 2021	Haleakala	Pan-STARRS 1	·	1.2 km	MPC · JPL
810780	2021 GX_{113}	—	April 4, 2021	Mount Lemmon	Mount Lemmon Survey	·	1.4 km	MPC · JPL
810781	2021 GA_{114}	—	October 10, 2018	Mount Lemmon	Mount Lemmon Survey	EUN	760 m	MPC · JPL
810782	2021 GJ_{114}	—	October 2, 2014	Haleakala	Pan-STARRS 1	HNS	730 m	MPC · JPL
810783	2021 GL_{114}	—	December 10, 2015	Mount Lemmon	Mount Lemmon Survey	·	930 m	MPC · JPL
810784	2021 GN_{114}	—	January 23, 2020	Mount Lemmon	Mount Lemmon Survey	·	2.5 km	MPC · JPL
810785	2021 GA_{115}	—	November 5, 2007	Mount Lemmon	Mount Lemmon Survey	·	680 m	MPC · JPL
810786	2021 GE_{115}	—	April 9, 2021	Haleakala	Pan-STARRS 1	·	920 m	MPC · JPL
810787	2021 GJ_{115}	—	April 10, 2021	Haleakala	Pan-STARRS 1	·	1.3 km	MPC · JPL
810788	2021 GN_{115}	—	September 21, 2011	Mount Lemmon	Mount Lemmon Survey	·	1.9 km	MPC · JPL
810789	2021 GZ_{115}	—	April 4, 2021	Mount Lemmon	Mount Lemmon Survey	EUN	790 m	MPC · JPL
810790	2021 GL_{117}	—	April 13, 2021	Haleakala	Pan-STARRS 1	·	1.0 km	MPC · JPL
810791	2021 GO_{119}	—	April 15, 2021	Haleakala	Pan-STARRS 1	·	1.5 km	MPC · JPL
810792	2021 GS_{122}	—	April 13, 2021	Haleakala	Pan-STARRS 1	·	980 m	MPC · JPL
810793	2021 GS_{123}	—	April 1, 2021	Mount Lemmon	Mount Lemmon Survey	BAR	600 m	MPC · JPL
810794	2021 GK_{126}	—	November 17, 2018	Mount Lemmon	Mount Lemmon Survey	EOS	1.4 km	MPC · JPL
810795	2021 GO_{128}	—	December 30, 2019	Kitt Peak	Bok NEO Survey	·	1.2 km	MPC · JPL
810796	2021 GP_{128}	—	September 19, 2006	Kitt Peak	Spacewatch	·	1.1 km	MPC · JPL
810797	2021 GT_{130}	—	April 6, 2021	Haleakala	Pan-STARRS 1	·	2.2 km	MPC · JPL
810798	2021 GO_{132}	—	April 11, 2021	Kitt Peak	Bok NEO Survey	·	2.2 km	MPC · JPL
810799	2021 GK_{139}	—	April 20, 2017	Haleakala	Pan-STARRS 1	·	760 m	MPC · JPL
810800	2021 GH_{140}	—	April 10, 2021	Mount Lemmon	Mount Lemmon Survey	·	930 m	MPC · JPL

== 810801–810900 ==
back to top

Designation			Discovery			Properties		Ref
Permanent	Provisional	Named after	Date	Site	Discoverer(s)	Category	Diam.	Ref
810801	2021 GO_{140}	—	April 3, 2021	Mount Lemmon	Mount Lemmon Survey	BRG	950 m	MPC · JPL
810802	2021 GC_{141}	—	October 12, 2015	Haleakala	Pan-STARRS 1	·	740 m	MPC · JPL
810803	2021 GE_{141}	—	September 9, 2018	Mount Lemmon	Mount Lemmon Survey	·	1.0 km	MPC · JPL
810804	2021 GA_{146}	—	November 9, 2013	Haleakala	Pan-STARRS 1	·	1.4 km	MPC · JPL
810805	2021 GN_{153}	—	April 14, 2021	Haleakala	Pan-STARRS 1	·	1.3 km	MPC · JPL
810806	2021 GJ_{158}	—	March 19, 2017	Haleakala	Pan-STARRS 1	MAR	600 m	MPC · JPL
810807	2021 GL_{159}	—	April 10, 2021	Haleakala	Pan-STARRS 1	L5	6.6 km	MPC · JPL
810808	2021 GM_{159}	—	April 10, 2021	Haleakala	Pan-STARRS 1	·	1.3 km	MPC · JPL
810809	2021 GP_{159}	—	April 13, 2021	Haleakala	Pan-STARRS 1	·	660 m	MPC · JPL
810810	2021 GY_{159}	—	April 4, 2021	Mount Lemmon	Mount Lemmon Survey	·	1.0 km	MPC · JPL
810811	2021 GS_{165}	—	April 3, 2021	Haleakala	Pan-STARRS 1	·	750 m	MPC · JPL
810812	2021 GM_{166}	—	April 4, 2021	Mount Lemmon	Mount Lemmon Survey	VER	1.9 km	MPC · JPL
810813	2021 GW_{166}	—	February 10, 2008	Kitt Peak	Spacewatch	·	870 m	MPC · JPL
810814	2021 GB_{167}	—	September 14, 2017	Haleakala	Pan-STARRS 1	·	1.6 km	MPC · JPL
810815	2021 GC_{167}	—	April 9, 2021	Haleakala	Pan-STARRS 1	·	730 m	MPC · JPL
810816	2021 GP_{168}	—	April 14, 2021	Haleakala	Pan-STARRS 1	·	1.3 km	MPC · JPL
810817	2021 GS_{168}	—	April 10, 2021	Haleakala	Pan-STARRS 1	·	1.3 km	MPC · JPL
810818	2021 GB_{169}	—	July 12, 2013	Haleakala	Pan-STARRS 1	·	1.1 km	MPC · JPL
810819	2021 GE_{169}	—	April 19, 2013	Haleakala	Pan-STARRS 1	MAR	560 m	MPC · JPL
810820	2021 GO_{172}	—	April 3, 2021	Mount Lemmon	Mount Lemmon Survey	·	2.0 km	MPC · JPL
810821	2021 GP_{177}	—	January 2, 2016	Haleakala	Pan-STARRS 1	·	1 km	MPC · JPL
810822	2021 GY_{177}	—	August 4, 2013	Haleakala	Pan-STARRS 1	·	1.2 km	MPC · JPL
810823	2021 GO_{179}	—	April 10, 2021	Haleakala	Pan-STARRS 1	·	1.1 km	MPC · JPL
810824	2021 GW_{179}	—	September 12, 2018	Mount Lemmon	Mount Lemmon Survey	·	1.2 km	MPC · JPL
810825	2021 GH_{182}	—	April 10, 2021	Haleakala	Pan-STARRS 1	HOF	1.9 km	MPC · JPL
810826	2021 GU_{183}	—	April 7, 2021	Haleakala	Pan-STARRS 1	·	960 m	MPC · JPL
810827	2021 GD_{184}	—	March 11, 2016	Mount Lemmon	Mount Lemmon Survey	AGN	910 m	MPC · JPL
810828	2021 GR_{184}	—	April 13, 2021	Haleakala	Pan-STARRS 1	MRX	790 m	MPC · JPL
810829	2021 GM_{186}	—	April 4, 2021	Mount Lemmon	Mount Lemmon Survey	EUN	710 m	MPC · JPL
810830	2021 GP_{187}	—	April 7, 2021	Haleakala	Pan-STARRS 1	·	1.5 km	MPC · JPL
810831	2021 GN_{196}	—	April 3, 2021	Haleakala	Pan-STARRS 1	·	1.0 km	MPC · JPL
810832	2021 GJ_{197}	—	April 9, 2021	Haleakala	Pan-STARRS 1	·	1.2 km	MPC · JPL
810833	2021 GE_{211}	—	April 2, 2021	Haleakala	Pan-STARRS 1	·	1.0 km	MPC · JPL
810834	2021 GA_{212}	—	April 13, 2021	Haleakala	Pan-STARRS 1	EOS	1.3 km	MPC · JPL
810835	2021 GZ_{213}	—	April 10, 2021	Haleakala	Pan-STARRS 1	HNS	590 m	MPC · JPL
810836	2021 GA_{217}	—	April 15, 2021	Haleakala	Pan-STARRS 1	HNS	760 m	MPC · JPL
810837	2021 GK_{217}	—	April 15, 2021	Haleakala	Pan-STARRS 1	BRA	820 m	MPC · JPL
810838	2021 GQ_{217}	—	April 10, 2021	Haleakala	Pan-STARRS 1	·	930 m	MPC · JPL
810839	2021 GW_{217}	—	April 3, 2016	Haleakala	Pan-STARRS 1	KOR	1.1 km	MPC · JPL
810840	2021 GE_{218}	—	April 14, 2021	Haleakala	Pan-STARRS 1	HNS	670 m	MPC · JPL
810841	2021 GH_{218}	—	October 30, 2014	Kitt Peak	Spacewatch	·	1.1 km	MPC · JPL
810842	2021 GS_{218}	—	November 20, 2014	Haleakala	Pan-STARRS 1	WIT	650 m	MPC · JPL
810843	2021 GN_{220}	—	April 7, 2021	Haleakala	Pan-STARRS 1	·	1.8 km	MPC · JPL
810844	2021 GG_{221}	—	April 10, 2021	Haleakala	Pan-STARRS 1	·	1.3 km	MPC · JPL
810845	2021 GN_{222}	—	October 24, 2014	Mount Lemmon	Mount Lemmon Survey	·	1.1 km	MPC · JPL
810846	2021 GN_{226}	—	April 7, 2021	Haleakala	Pan-STARRS 1	·	650 m	MPC · JPL
810847	2021 GT_{226}	—	November 29, 2014	Mount Lemmon	Mount Lemmon Survey	·	1.3 km	MPC · JPL
810848	2021 HK_{3}	—	April 16, 2021	Haleakala	Pan-STARRS 1	·	950 m	MPC · JPL
810849	2021 HU_{3}	—	April 16, 2021	Haleakala	Pan-STARRS 1	·	890 m	MPC · JPL
810850	2021 HB_{4}	—	May 21, 2017	Haleakala	Pan-STARRS 1	·	950 m	MPC · JPL
810851	2021 HE_{4}	—	April 18, 2021	Haleakala	Pan-STARRS 1	·	1.4 km	MPC · JPL
810852	2021 HS_{4}	—	April 9, 2008	Kitt Peak	Spacewatch	critical	900 m	MPC · JPL
810853	2021 HK_{5}	—	April 17, 2021	Haleakala	Pan-STARRS 1	·	1.0 km	MPC · JPL
810854	2021 HR_{5}	—	September 28, 2009	Mount Lemmon	Mount Lemmon Survey	·	1.2 km	MPC · JPL
810855	2021 HA_{6}	—	July 13, 2013	Haleakala	Pan-STARRS 1	·	1.1 km	MPC · JPL
810856	2021 HD_{6}	—	April 30, 2016	Mount Lemmon	Mount Lemmon Survey	·	1.5 km	MPC · JPL
810857	2021 HE_{6}	—	April 17, 2021	Haleakala	Pan-STARRS 1	·	2.0 km	MPC · JPL
810858	2021 HB_{7}	—	April 17, 2021	Haleakala	Pan-STARRS 1	·	1.1 km	MPC · JPL
810859	2021 HE_{8}	—	January 20, 2020	Haleakala	Pan-STARRS 1	·	1.1 km	MPC · JPL
810860	2021 HP_{8}	—	April 17, 2021	Haleakala	Pan-STARRS 1	·	990 m	MPC · JPL
810861	2021 HQ_{8}	—	September 6, 2013	Catalina	CSS	·	1.3 km	MPC · JPL
810862	2021 HR_{8}	—	March 27, 2016	Mount Lemmon	Mount Lemmon Survey	MRX	690 m	MPC · JPL
810863	2021 HX_{8}	—	October 15, 2018	Haleakala	Pan-STARRS 2	KON	1.6 km	MPC · JPL
810864	2021 HB_{9}	—	February 6, 2008	Kitt Peak	Spacewatch	·	780 m	MPC · JPL
810865	2021 HE_{9}	—	April 15, 2012	Haleakala	Pan-STARRS 1	·	1.1 km	MPC · JPL
810866	2021 HM_{10}	—	June 25, 2017	Haleakala	Pan-STARRS 1	·	960 m	MPC · JPL
810867	2021 HA_{11}	—	April 16, 2021	Haleakala	Pan-STARRS 1	·	1.1 km	MPC · JPL
810868	2021 HN_{12}	—	April 17, 2021	Haleakala	Pan-STARRS 1	·	1.0 km	MPC · JPL
810869	2021 HZ_{12}	—	April 17, 2021	Haleakala	Pan-STARRS 1	·	1.3 km	MPC · JPL
810870	2021 HZ_{13}	—	April 17, 2021	Haleakala	Pan-STARRS 1	·	960 m	MPC · JPL
810871	2021 HM_{14}	—	April 17, 2021	Haleakala	Pan-STARRS 1	·	1.1 km	MPC · JPL
810872	2021 HU_{14}	—	April 18, 2021	Haleakala	Pan-STARRS 1	·	1.3 km	MPC · JPL
810873	2021 HZ_{15}	—	April 17, 2021	Haleakala	Pan-STARRS 1	·	840 m	MPC · JPL
810874	2021 HO_{17}	—	April 17, 2021	Haleakala	Pan-STARRS 1	·	1.2 km	MPC · JPL
810875	2021 HR_{17}	—	April 2, 2016	Haleakala	Pan-STARRS 1	·	1.5 km	MPC · JPL
810876	2021 HX_{17}	—	March 29, 2012	Haleakala	Pan-STARRS 1	critical	790 m	MPC · JPL
810877	2021 HF_{18}	—	October 2, 2014	Haleakala	Pan-STARRS 1	·	700 m	MPC · JPL
810878	2021 HC_{22}	—	January 27, 2015	Haleakala	Pan-STARRS 1	·	1.4 km	MPC · JPL
810879	2021 HD_{24}	—	April 27, 2012	Haleakala	Pan-STARRS 1	·	1.2 km	MPC · JPL
810880	2021 HA_{26}	—	November 1, 2018	Mount Lemmon	Mount Lemmon Survey	·	1.1 km	MPC · JPL
810881	2021 HG_{26}	—	December 30, 2013	Mount Lemmon	Mount Lemmon Survey	·	1.5 km	MPC · JPL
810882	2021 HS_{26}	—	January 18, 2008	Mount Lemmon	Mount Lemmon Survey	·	1.0 km	MPC · JPL
810883	2021 HF_{28}	—	July 28, 2011	Haleakala	Pan-STARRS 1	THM	1.5 km	MPC · JPL
810884	2021 HZ_{30}	—	April 18, 2021	Mount Lemmon	Mount Lemmon Survey	·	1.4 km	MPC · JPL
810885	2021 HC_{31}	—	April 17, 2021	Haleakala	Pan-STARRS 1	EOS	1.3 km	MPC · JPL
810886	2021 HN_{31}	—	April 17, 2021	Haleakala	Pan-STARRS 1	·	1.1 km	MPC · JPL
810887	2021 HT_{31}	—	April 16, 2021	Haleakala	Pan-STARRS 1	·	1.3 km	MPC · JPL
810888	2021 HB_{36}	—	April 17, 2021	Haleakala	Pan-STARRS 1	·	2.0 km	MPC · JPL
810889	2021 HY_{40}	—	April 19, 2021	Haleakala	Pan-STARRS 1	HNS	680 m	MPC · JPL
810890	2021 JZ_{7}	—	July 29, 2008	Mount Lemmon	Mount Lemmon Survey	·	1.3 km	MPC · JPL
810891	2021 JP_{10}	—	October 4, 2018	Haleakala	Pan-STARRS 2	·	790 m	MPC · JPL
810892	2021 JR_{10}	—	January 4, 2016	Haleakala	Pan-STARRS 1	·	800 m	MPC · JPL
810893	2021 JX_{10}	—	February 8, 2011	Mount Lemmon	Mount Lemmon Survey	·	1.2 km	MPC · JPL
810894	2021 JK_{11}	—	May 1, 2012	Mount Lemmon	Mount Lemmon Survey	·	1.1 km	MPC · JPL
810895	2021 JS_{11}	—	February 27, 2012	Haleakala	Pan-STARRS 1	MIS	1.6 km	MPC · JPL
810896	2021 JZ_{11}	—	April 5, 2008	Mount Lemmon	Mount Lemmon Survey	·	870 m	MPC · JPL
810897	2021 JY_{13}	—	March 15, 2008	Kitt Peak	Spacewatch	critical	840 m	MPC · JPL
810898	2021 JN_{14}	—	May 12, 2021	Mount Lemmon	Mount Lemmon Survey	·	1.0 km	MPC · JPL
810899	2021 JY_{14}	—	October 18, 2018	Mount Lemmon	Mount Lemmon Survey	WIT	710 m	MPC · JPL
810900	2021 JZ_{17}	—	May 3, 2021	Haleakala	Pan-STARRS 1	·	1.2 km	MPC · JPL

== 810901–811000 ==
back to top

Designation			Discovery			Properties		Ref
Permanent	Provisional	Named after	Date	Site	Discoverer(s)	Category	Diam.	Ref
810901	2021 JC_{18}	—	October 2, 2006	Mount Lemmon	Mount Lemmon Survey	·	1.8 km	MPC · JPL
810902	2021 JX_{19}	—	July 25, 2017	Haleakala	Pan-STARRS 1	·	1.3 km	MPC · JPL
810903	2021 JR_{23}	—	May 4, 2021	Haleakala	Pan-STARRS 1	·	1.1 km	MPC · JPL
810904	2021 JU_{23}	—	May 10, 2021	Haleakala	Pan-STARRS 1	·	1.6 km	MPC · JPL
810905	2021 JL_{24}	—	June 15, 2005	Kitt Peak	Spacewatch	·	930 m	MPC · JPL
810906	2021 JE_{26}	—	May 9, 2021	Haleakala	Pan-STARRS 1	·	1.7 km	MPC · JPL
810907	2021 JP_{26}	—	May 4, 2021	Haleakala	Pan-STARRS 1	(18466)	1.2 km	MPC · JPL
810908	2021 JR_{27}	—	May 12, 2021	Mount Lemmon	Mount Lemmon Survey	RAF	650 m	MPC · JPL
810909	2021 JM_{28}	—	April 18, 2015	Cerro Tololo	DECam	·	2.4 km	MPC · JPL
810910	2021 JO_{29}	—	September 4, 2014	Haleakala	Pan-STARRS 1	·	860 m	MPC · JPL
810911	2021 JX_{30}	—	May 3, 2021	Haleakala	Pan-STARRS 1	MAR	640 m	MPC · JPL
810912	2021 JR_{33}	—	May 18, 2015	Haleakala	Pan-STARRS 1	EUP	2.3 km	MPC · JPL
810913	2021 JV_{35}	—	October 6, 2013	Cerro Tololo-DECam	DECam	L5	5.9 km	MPC · JPL
810914	2021 JH_{38}	—	July 25, 2017	Haleakala	Pan-STARRS 1	KOR	1.0 km	MPC · JPL
810915	2021 JS_{40}	—	March 30, 2016	Haleakala	Pan-STARRS 1	GEF	770 m	MPC · JPL
810916	2021 JP_{45}	—	June 18, 2013	Haleakala	Pan-STARRS 1	·	840 m	MPC · JPL
810917	2021 JB_{48}	—	September 10, 2013	Haleakala	Pan-STARRS 1	·	900 m	MPC · JPL
810918	2021 JX_{50}	—	May 9, 2021	Haleakala	Pan-STARRS 1	·	1.7 km	MPC · JPL
810919	2021 JH_{52}	—	May 12, 2021	Haleakala	Pan-STARRS 1	·	990 m	MPC · JPL
810920	2021 JB_{53}	—	May 12, 2021	Haleakala	Pan-STARRS 1	VER	1.6 km	MPC · JPL
810921	2021 JY_{54}	—	May 4, 2021	Haleakala	Pan-STARRS 1	·	1.4 km	MPC · JPL
810922	2021 JH_{56}	—	November 2, 2018	Haleakala	Pan-STARRS 2	·	740 m	MPC · JPL
810923	2021 JG_{57}	—	May 3, 2021	Haleakala	Pan-STARRS 1	·	1.0 km	MPC · JPL
810924	2021 JE_{58}	—	May 12, 2021	Haleakala	Pan-STARRS 1	(5)	930 m	MPC · JPL
810925	2021 JF_{59}	—	May 3, 2021	Haleakala	Pan-STARRS 1	·	1.0 km	MPC · JPL
810926	2021 JG_{59}	—	May 3, 2021	Haleakala	Pan-STARRS 1	·	1.3 km	MPC · JPL
810927	2021 JY_{62}	—	November 10, 2018	Mount Lemmon	Mount Lemmon Survey	·	1.1 km	MPC · JPL
810928	2021 JG_{64}	—	May 12, 2021	Haleakala	Pan-STARRS 1	·	1.4 km	MPC · JPL
810929	2021 JL_{71}	—	May 8, 2021	Haleakala	Pan-STARRS 1	·	1.9 km	MPC · JPL
810930	2021 JX_{77}	—	May 8, 2021	Haleakala	Pan-STARRS 1	·	2.4 km	MPC · JPL
810931	2021 JA_{78}	—	May 8, 2021	Haleakala	Pan-STARRS 1	·	1.4 km	MPC · JPL
810932	2021 KU_{3}	—	May 19, 2021	Haleakala	Pan-STARRS 1	·	1.1 km	MPC · JPL
810933	2021 KY_{4}	—	April 11, 2016	Haleakala	Pan-STARRS 1	·	1.4 km	MPC · JPL
810934	2021 KQ_{5}	—	May 31, 2021	Haleakala	Pan-STARRS 1	·	1.0 km	MPC · JPL
810935	2021 KS_{5}	—	May 11, 2015	Mount Lemmon	Mount Lemmon Survey	EOS	1.3 km	MPC · JPL
810936	2021 KD_{7}	—	December 29, 2014	Haleakala	Pan-STARRS 1	·	950 m	MPC · JPL
810937	2021 KK_{9}	—	April 19, 2012	Mount Lemmon	Mount Lemmon Survey	·	1.1 km	MPC · JPL
810938	2021 KZ_{9}	—	September 20, 2009	Kitt Peak	Spacewatch	EUN	860 m	MPC · JPL
810939	2021 KD_{14}	—	March 28, 2008	Mount Lemmon	Mount Lemmon Survey	·	900 m	MPC · JPL
810940	2021 KL_{14}	—	May 16, 2021	Haleakala	Pan-STARRS 1	·	2.6 km	MPC · JPL
810941	2021 KJ_{16}	—	March 13, 2016	Haleakala	Pan-STARRS 1	·	1.4 km	MPC · JPL
810942	2021 KO_{16}	—	January 28, 2015	Haleakala	Pan-STARRS 1	EOS	1.2 km	MPC · JPL
810943	2021 KG_{21}	—	May 20, 2021	Kitt Peak	Bok NEO Survey	·	1.9 km	MPC · JPL
810944	2021 LV_{1}	—	September 15, 2017	Haleakala	Pan-STARRS 1	·	860 m	MPC · JPL
810945	2021 LY_{3}	—	March 7, 2016	Haleakala	Pan-STARRS 1	·	1.2 km	MPC · JPL
810946	2021 LS_{8}	—	August 24, 2017	Haleakala	Pan-STARRS 1	·	1.8 km	MPC · JPL
810947	2021 LB_{10}	—	January 13, 2015	Haleakala	Pan-STARRS 1	·	1.2 km	MPC · JPL
810948	2021 LM_{10}	—	March 16, 2012	Mount Lemmon	Mount Lemmon Survey	·	1.2 km	MPC · JPL
810949	2021 LZ_{10}	—	October 12, 2013	Mount Lemmon	Mount Lemmon Survey	PAD	1.1 km	MPC · JPL
810950	2021 LP_{11}	—	October 12, 2007	Mount Lemmon	Mount Lemmon Survey	·	1.7 km	MPC · JPL
810951	2021 LJ_{13}	—	September 27, 2005	Kitt Peak	Spacewatch	EUN	770 m	MPC · JPL
810952	2021 LS_{14}	—	March 4, 2016	Haleakala	Pan-STARRS 1	·	1.0 km	MPC · JPL
810953	2021 LP_{18}	—	June 15, 2013	Mount Lemmon	Mount Lemmon Survey	·	1.2 km	MPC · JPL
810954	2021 LY_{18}	—	September 24, 2008	Mount Lemmon	Mount Lemmon Survey	·	1.4 km	MPC · JPL
810955	2021 LC_{20}	—	June 13, 2016	Haleakala	Pan-STARRS 1	·	2.7 km	MPC · JPL
810956	2021 LE_{20}	—	June 11, 2021	Haleakala	Pan-STARRS 1	·	840 m	MPC · JPL
810957	2021 LF_{20}	—	January 26, 2020	Haleakala	Pan-STARRS 2	BRA	940 m	MPC · JPL
810958	2021 LK_{22}	—	June 2, 2021	Haleakala	Pan-STARRS 1	·	1.3 km	MPC · JPL
810959	2021 LC_{23}	—	August 7, 2016	Haleakala	Pan-STARRS 1	·	1.4 km	MPC · JPL
810960	2021 LS_{28}	—	July 19, 2013	Haleakala	Pan-STARRS 1	KON	1.3 km	MPC · JPL
810961	2021 LU_{28}	—	June 6, 2021	Haleakala	Pan-STARRS 1	DOR	1.6 km	MPC · JPL
810962	2021 LJ_{29}	—	May 26, 2015	Haleakala	Pan-STARRS 1	·	1.8 km	MPC · JPL
810963	2021 LH_{30}	—	June 11, 2015	Haleakala	Pan-STARRS 1	·	1.3 km	MPC · JPL
810964	2021 LE_{33}	—	June 13, 2021	Haleakala	Pan-STARRS 1	·	3.0 km	MPC · JPL
810965	2021 LV_{34}	—	June 6, 2021	Haleakala	Pan-STARRS 1	·	1.8 km	MPC · JPL
810966	2021 LM_{38}	—	June 5, 2021	Haleakala	Pan-STARRS 1	·	1.2 km	MPC · JPL
810967	2021 LL_{40}	—	January 20, 2015	Haleakala	Pan-STARRS 1	·	1.2 km	MPC · JPL
810968	2021 LT_{40}	—	August 31, 2005	Palomar Mountain	NEAT	(5)	1.1 km	MPC · JPL
810969	2021 LC_{41}	—	June 5, 2021	Haleakala	Pan-STARRS 1	·	1.0 km	MPC · JPL
810970	2021 LZ_{42}	—	June 14, 2021	Haleakala	Pan-STARRS 1	·	1.2 km	MPC · JPL
810971	2021 LK_{49}	—	June 5, 2021	Haleakala	Pan-STARRS 1	EUP	3.2 km	MPC · JPL
810972	2021 LN_{49}	—	June 8, 2021	Haleakala	Pan-STARRS 1	·	2.0 km	MPC · JPL
810973	2021 MW_{5}	—	June 30, 2021	Haleakala	Pan-STARRS 1	BRA	1.1 km	MPC · JPL
810974	2021 MP_{18}	—	June 21, 2021	Haleakala	Pan-STARRS 1	·	2.4 km	MPC · JPL
810975	2021 MN_{19}	—	May 23, 2014	Haleakala	Pan-STARRS 1	·	2.6 km	MPC · JPL
810976	2021 MM_{20}	—	October 10, 2012	Mount Lemmon	Mount Lemmon Survey	·	1.3 km	MPC · JPL
810977	2021 MW_{20}	—	June 16, 2021	Haleakala	Pan-STARRS 1	·	1.2 km	MPC · JPL
810978	2021 MM_{23}	—	June 16, 2021	Haleakala	Pan-STARRS 1	·	1.2 km	MPC · JPL
810979	2021 NC_{2}	—	March 22, 2020	Haleakala	Pan-STARRS 1	·	1.3 km	MPC · JPL
810980	2021 NC_{7}	—	January 3, 2019	Haleakala	Pan-STARRS 1	·	1.4 km	MPC · JPL
810981	2021 NG_{7}	—	January 22, 2015	Haleakala	Pan-STARRS 1	·	1.3 km	MPC · JPL
810982	2021 NX_{11}	—	April 16, 2020	Mount Lemmon	Mount Lemmon Survey	·	1.8 km	MPC · JPL
810983	2021 NM_{13}	—	July 5, 2021	Haleakala	Pan-STARRS 1	·	2.0 km	MPC · JPL
810984	2021 NN_{13}	—	August 2, 2016	Haleakala	Pan-STARRS 1	EOS	1.2 km	MPC · JPL
810985	2021 NP_{20}	—	July 7, 2021	Haleakala	Pan-STARRS 1	·	990 m	MPC · JPL
810986	2021 NX_{20}	—	February 10, 2016	Haleakala	Pan-STARRS 1	·	1.2 km	MPC · JPL
810987	2021 NP_{23}	—	September 22, 2016	Mount Lemmon	Mount Lemmon Survey	·	2.3 km	MPC · JPL
810988	2021 NV_{23}	—	August 30, 2016	Mount Lemmon	Mount Lemmon Survey	EOS	1.6 km	MPC · JPL
810989	2021 NQ_{33}	—	July 7, 2021	Haleakala	Pan-STARRS 1	·	2.3 km	MPC · JPL
810990	2021 NS_{43}	—	July 7, 2021	Haleakala	Pan-STARRS 1	·	2.2 km	MPC · JPL
810991	2021 NB_{50}	—	April 16, 2020	Haleakala	Pan-STARRS 1	DOR	1.8 km	MPC · JPL
810992	2021 NV_{51}	—	January 21, 2015	Haleakala	Pan-STARRS 1	MAR	710 m	MPC · JPL
810993	2021 NF_{55}	—	April 22, 2020	Haleakala	Pan-STARRS 1	AGN	860 m	MPC · JPL
810994	2021 NZ_{57}	—	April 27, 2012	Haleakala	Pan-STARRS 1	·	1.0 km	MPC · JPL
810995	2021 NX_{58}	—	June 11, 2021	Haleakala	Pan-STARRS 1	HOF	1.9 km	MPC · JPL
810996	2021 NA_{61}	—	July 10, 2021	Haleakala	Pan-STARRS 1	EOS	1.4 km	MPC · JPL
810997	2021 NK_{63}	—	July 9, 2021	Haleakala	Pan-STARRS 1	·	1.8 km	MPC · JPL
810998	2021 NV_{63}	—	August 26, 2012	Haleakala	Pan-STARRS 1	KOR	890 m	MPC · JPL
810999	2021 NF_{65}	—	September 4, 2011	Haleakala	Pan-STARRS 1	EOS	1.3 km	MPC · JPL
811000	2021 NG_{65}	—	November 24, 2017	Mount Lemmon	Mount Lemmon Survey	·	1.9 km	MPC · JPL

back to top

== Meaning of names ==
As minor planet discoveries are confirmed, they are given a permanent number by the IAU's Minor Planet Center (MPC), and the discoverers can then submit names for them, following the IAU's naming conventions. The list below concerns those minor planets in the specified number-range that have received names, and explains the meanings of those names.

Official naming citations of newly named small Solar System bodies are approved and published in a bulletin by IAU's Working Group for Small Bodies Nomenclature (WGSBN). Before May 2021, citations were published in MPC's Minor Planet Circulars for many decades. Recent citations can also be found on the JPL Small-Body Database (SBDB). Until his death in 2016, German astronomer Lutz D. Schmadel compiled these citations into the Dictionary of Minor Planet Names (DMP) and regularly updated the collection.

Based on Paul Herget's The Names of the Minor Planets, Schmadel also researched the unclear origin of numerous asteroids, most of which had been named prior to World War II. This article incorporates text from this source, which is in the public domain: SBDB New namings may only be added to this list below after official publication as the preannouncement of names is condemned. The WGSBN publishes a comprehensive guideline for the naming rules of non-cometary small Solar System bodies.

Named minor planet	Provisional	This minor planet was named for...	Ref · Catalog
810619 Gaoyu	2021 ED_{52}	Gao Yu, Chinese lecturer at Xi'an University of Finance and Economics.	IAU · 810619
810657 ESOC	2021 FE_{40}	ESOC is an acronym for the European Space Operations Centre, which was inaugurated in 1967.	IAU · 810657
