= List of minor planets: 791001–792000 =

The following is a partial list of minor planets, running from minor-planet number 791001 through 792000, inclusive. The primary data for this and other partial lists is based on JPL's "Small-Body Orbital Elements" and data available from the Minor Planet Center. Critical list information is also provided by the MPC, unless otherwise specified from Lowell Observatory. A detailed description of the table's columns and additional sources are given on the main page including a complete list of every page in this series, and a statistical break-up on the dynamical classification of minor planets.

Also see the summary list of all named bodies in numerical and alphabetical order, and the corresponding naming citations for the number range of this particular list. New namings may only be added to this list after official publication, as the preannouncement of names is condemned by the Working Group for Small Bodies Nomenclature of the International Astronomical Union.

Near-Earth obj.	MBA (inner)	MBA (outer)	Centaur
Mars-crosser	MBA (middle)	Jupiter trojan	Trans-Neptunian obj.
Unclassified

== 791001–791100 ==
Designation			Discovery			Properties		Ref
Permanent	Provisional	Named after	Date	Site	Discoverer(s)	Category	Diam.	Ref
791001	2019 JQ_{74}	—	May 3, 2019	Mount Lemmon	Mount Lemmon Survey	NEM	1.6 km	MPC · JPL
791002	2019 JH_{77}	—	May 2, 2019	Haleakala	Pan-STARRS 1	·	1.0 km	MPC · JPL
791003	2019 JQ_{82}	—	May 7, 2019	Haleakala	Pan-STARRS 1	·	970 m	MPC · JPL
791004	2019 JE_{83}	—	May 2, 2019	Haleakala	Pan-STARRS 1	EUN	820 m	MPC · JPL
791005	2019 JC_{84}	—	May 1, 2019	Haleakala	Pan-STARRS 1	(5)	960 m	MPC · JPL
791006	2019 JE_{107}	—	May 8, 2019	Haleakala	Pan-STARRS 1	3:2	4.4 km	MPC · JPL
791007	2019 JX_{120}	—	May 6, 2019	Haleakala	Pan-STARRS 1	L5	6.5 km	MPC · JPL
791008	2019 JR_{121}	—	May 1, 2019	Haleakala	Pan-STARRS 1	·	1.5 km	MPC · JPL
791009	2019 KG_{6}	—	May 29, 2019	Haleakala	Pan-STARRS 1	L4	8.0 km	MPC · JPL
791010	2019 KA_{13}	—	May 26, 2019	Haleakala	Pan-STARRS 1	·	1.9 km	MPC · JPL
791011	2019 KH_{16}	—	January 17, 2013	Haleakala	Pan-STARRS 1	·	1.4 km	MPC · JPL
791012	2019 KO_{20}	—	May 31, 2019	Haleakala	Pan-STARRS 1	(5)	730 m	MPC · JPL
791013	2019 KA_{25}	—	May 25, 2019	Haleakala	Pan-STARRS 1	·	1.9 km	MPC · JPL
791014	2019 KC_{29}	—	May 25, 2019	Haleakala	Pan-STARRS 1	·	870 m	MPC · JPL
791015	2019 KC_{35}	—	May 29, 2019	Haleakala	Pan-STARRS 1	·	930 m	MPC · JPL
791016	2019 KF_{36}	—	September 14, 2007	Catalina	CSS	·	890 m	MPC · JPL
791017	2019 KJ_{38}	—	May 25, 2019	Haleakala	Pan-STARRS 1	·	960 m	MPC · JPL
791018	2019 KO_{52}	—	May 29, 2019	Haleakala	Pan-STARRS 1	BRG	1.1 km	MPC · JPL
791019	2019 KG_{53}	—	December 26, 2017	Haleakala	Pan-STARRS 1	·	1.4 km	MPC · JPL
791020	2019 KC_{63}	—	September 13, 2007	Mount Lemmon	Mount Lemmon Survey	·	970 m	MPC · JPL
791021	2019 KP_{74}	—	January 14, 2011	Mount Lemmon	Mount Lemmon Survey	·	2.4 km	MPC · JPL
791022	2019 KZ_{77}	—	May 25, 2019	Haleakala	Pan-STARRS 1	·	1.2 km	MPC · JPL
791023	2019 KB_{79}	—	May 27, 2019	Haleakala	Pan-STARRS 1	·	850 m	MPC · JPL
791024	2019 LM_{6}	—	June 1, 2019	Haleakala	Pan-STARRS 1	L4	7.9 km	MPC · JPL
791025	2019 LK_{14}	—	December 5, 2008	Kitt Peak	Spacewatch	·	850 m	MPC · JPL
791026	2019 LY_{14}	—	June 4, 2019	Palomar	Zwicky Transient Facility	·	1.1 km	MPC · JPL
791027	2019 LG_{15}	—	June 12, 2019	Haleakala	Pan-STARRS 1	·	2.4 km	MPC · JPL
791028	2019 LR_{18}	—	June 8, 2019	Haleakala	Pan-STARRS 1	HOF	1.8 km	MPC · JPL
791029	2019 LS_{18}	—	March 5, 2014	Cerro Tololo	High Cadence Transient Survey	MAR	710 m	MPC · JPL
791030	2019 LM_{19}	—	June 9, 2019	Haleakala	Pan-STARRS 1	L4	8.0 km	MPC · JPL
791031	2019 LP_{21}	—	June 2, 2019	Palomar	Zwicky Transient Facility	EUN	1.0 km	MPC · JPL
791032	2019 LZ_{21}	—	June 1, 2019	Haleakala	Pan-STARRS 1	HNS	1.0 km	MPC · JPL
791033	2019 LN_{29}	—	April 18, 2015	Cerro Tololo	DECam	L4	6.2 km	MPC · JPL
791034	2019 LG_{30}	—	June 10, 2019	Haleakala	Pan-STARRS 1	·	1.3 km	MPC · JPL
791035	2019 MB_{11}	—	September 25, 2011	Haleakala	Pan-STARRS 1	·	810 m	MPC · JPL
791036	2019 MV_{11}	—	June 30, 2019	Haleakala	Pan-STARRS 1	KOR	1 km	MPC · JPL
791037	2019 MA_{12}	—	June 30, 2019	Haleakala	Pan-STARRS 1	·	1.5 km	MPC · JPL
791038	2019 MB_{12}	—	June 30, 2019	Haleakala	Pan-STARRS 1	·	1.4 km	MPC · JPL
791039	2019 MZ_{12}	—	June 2, 2010	WISE	WISE	·	850 m	MPC · JPL
791040	2019 MK_{13}	—	June 24, 2019	Palomar	Zwicky Transient Facility	MAR	800 m	MPC · JPL
791041	2019 MM_{18}	—	June 30, 2019	Haleakala	Pan-STARRS 1	·	1.2 km	MPC · JPL
791042	2019 MU_{18}	—	June 25, 2019	Haleakala	Pan-STARRS 1	·	920 m	MPC · JPL
791043	2019 MT_{24}	—	June 30, 2019	Haleakala	Pan-STARRS 1	L4	5.5 km	MPC · JPL
791044	2019 MD_{25}	—	May 21, 2014	Haleakala	Pan-STARRS 1	·	1.2 km	MPC · JPL
791045	2019 ML_{25}	—	May 23, 2014	Haleakala	Pan-STARRS 1	·	1.4 km	MPC · JPL
791046	2019 MP_{25}	—	June 30, 2019	Haleakala	Pan-STARRS 1	·	750 m	MPC · JPL
791047	2019 MU_{25}	—	June 28, 2019	Haleakala	Pan-STARRS 1	·	1.1 km	MPC · JPL
791048	2019 MY_{25}	—	June 29, 2019	Haleakala	Pan-STARRS 1	GEF	830 m	MPC · JPL
791049	2019 MS_{27}	—	June 30, 2019	Haleakala	Pan-STARRS 1	·	1.4 km	MPC · JPL
791050	2019 MV_{27}	—	June 30, 2019	Haleakala	Pan-STARRS 1	·	1.5 km	MPC · JPL
791051	2019 MC_{29}	—	June 25, 2019	Haleakala	Pan-STARRS 1	·	930 m	MPC · JPL
791052	2019 NH_{9}	—	October 16, 2009	Mount Lemmon	Mount Lemmon Survey	L4	5.5 km	MPC · JPL
791053	2019 ND_{24}	—	July 13, 2019	Haleakala	Pan-STARRS 1	GEF	940 m	MPC · JPL
791054	2019 NC_{35}	—	July 1, 2019	Haleakala	Pan-STARRS 1	·	1.1 km	MPC · JPL
791055	2019 NX_{36}	—	April 23, 2014	Cerro Tololo	DECam	·	590 m	MPC · JPL
791056	2019 NY_{36}	—	July 10, 2019	Haleakala	Pan-STARRS 1	·	1.1 km	MPC · JPL
791057	2019 NF_{37}	—	July 6, 2019	Haleakala	Pan-STARRS 1	ADE	1.2 km	MPC · JPL
791058	2019 NH_{37}	—	July 1, 2019	Haleakala	Pan-STARRS 1	·	1.1 km	MPC · JPL
791059	2019 NA_{38}	—	July 10, 2019	Haleakala	Pan-STARRS 1	EOS	1.4 km	MPC · JPL
791060	2019 NC_{38}	—	July 1, 2019	Haleakala	Pan-STARRS 1	·	1.1 km	MPC · JPL
791061	2019 NN_{38}	—	July 4, 2019	Haleakala	Pan-STARRS 2	·	1.8 km	MPC · JPL
791062	2019 NU_{38}	—	July 4, 2019	Haleakala	Pan-STARRS 1	·	2.5 km	MPC · JPL
791063	2019 NY_{38}	—	July 4, 2019	Haleakala	Pan-STARRS 1	HNS	820 m	MPC · JPL
791064	2019 NN_{39}	—	July 4, 2019	Haleakala	Pan-STARRS 1	·	1.1 km	MPC · JPL
791065	2019 NA_{40}	—	April 29, 2014	Cerro Tololo	DECam	·	1.2 km	MPC · JPL
791066	2019 NG_{40}	—	July 1, 2019	Haleakala	Pan-STARRS 1	·	1.3 km	MPC · JPL
791067	2019 NC_{42}	—	July 4, 2019	Haleakala	Pan-STARRS 2	·	1.4 km	MPC · JPL
791068	2019 ND_{42}	—	July 1, 2019	Haleakala	Pan-STARRS 1	L4	5.6 km	MPC · JPL
791069	2019 NG_{48}	—	July 1, 2019	Haleakala	Pan-STARRS 1	L4 · ERY	5.2 km	MPC · JPL
791070	2019 NH_{48}	—	July 7, 2019	Haleakala	Pan-STARRS 1	L4	5.7 km	MPC · JPL
791071	2019 NL_{48}	—	May 1, 2016	Cerro Tololo	DECam	L4 · (8060)	5.4 km	MPC · JPL
791072	2019 NG_{51}	—	July 6, 2019	Haleakala	Pan-STARRS 1	L4	6.5 km	MPC · JPL
791073	2019 NW_{51}	—	July 6, 2019	Haleakala	Pan-STARRS 1	L4	7.3 km	MPC · JPL
791074	2019 NF_{52}	—	July 7, 2019	Mauna Kea	D. J. Tholen, C. Crowder	·	1.3 km	MPC · JPL
791075	2019 NM_{52}	—	April 18, 2015	Cerro Tololo	DECam	L4	5.5 km	MPC · JPL
791076	2019 NG_{53}	—	April 18, 2015	Cerro Tololo	DECam	L4	5.3 km	MPC · JPL
791077	2019 NL_{53}	—	July 4, 2019	Haleakala	Pan-STARRS 1	L4	5.8 km	MPC · JPL
791078	2019 NS_{58}	—	July 6, 2019	Haleakala	Pan-STARRS 1	L4	6.7 km	MPC · JPL
791079	2019 NB_{59}	—	July 7, 2019	Haleakala	Pan-STARRS 1	·	930 m	MPC · JPL
791080	2019 NK_{64}	—	July 6, 2019	Haleakala	Pan-STARRS 1	·	810 m	MPC · JPL
791081	2019 NZ_{64}	—	April 24, 2014	Cerro Tololo	DECam	·	1.0 km	MPC · JPL
791082	2019 NT_{71}	—	July 1, 2019	Haleakala	Pan-STARRS 1	L4	5.6 km	MPC · JPL
791083	2019 NG_{72}	—	July 4, 2019	Haleakala	Pan-STARRS 1	·	1.5 km	MPC · JPL
791084	2019 NK_{74}	—	July 1, 2019	Haleakala	Pan-STARRS 1	L4	5.9 km	MPC · JPL
791085	2019 NT_{74}	—	July 5, 2019	Haleakala	Pan-STARRS 1	·	1.3 km	MPC · JPL
791086	2019 NA_{78}	—	July 1, 2019	Haleakala	Pan-STARRS 1	L4	5.7 km	MPC · JPL
791087	2019 NO_{78}	—	March 21, 2015	Haleakala	Pan-STARRS 1	L4 · ERY	4.8 km	MPC · JPL
791088	2019 NV_{78}	—	July 1, 2019	Haleakala	Pan-STARRS 1	L4	5.6 km	MPC · JPL
791089	2019 NZ_{78}	—	September 4, 2008	Kitt Peak	Spacewatch	L4	5.8 km	MPC · JPL
791090	2019 NA_{79}	—	May 3, 2016	Cerro Tololo	DECam	L4 · ERY	6.0 km	MPC · JPL
791091	2019 NB_{79}	—	July 6, 2019	Haleakala	Pan-STARRS 1	L4	5.1 km	MPC · JPL
791092	2019 NJ_{79}	—	July 1, 2019	Haleakala	Pan-STARRS 1	·	1.2 km	MPC · JPL
791093	2019 NX_{82}	—	July 5, 2019	Haleakala	Pan-STARRS 1	·	1.3 km	MPC · JPL
791094	2019 NT_{85}	—	July 1, 2019	Haleakala	Pan-STARRS 1	·	1.0 km	MPC · JPL
791095	2019 NX_{91}	—	May 1, 2016	Cerro Tololo	DECam	L4	5.0 km	MPC · JPL
791096	2019 NP_{95}	—	July 4, 2019	Haleakala	Pan-STARRS 1	·	1.3 km	MPC · JPL
791097	2019 NO_{96}	—	July 4, 2019	Palomar	Zwicky Transient Facility	BRG	960 m	MPC · JPL
791098	2019 NU_{113}	—	July 4, 2019	Haleakala	Pan-STARRS 1	·	1.3 km	MPC · JPL
791099	2019 NY_{115}	—	July 4, 2019	Haleakala	Pan-STARRS 1	·	1.4 km	MPC · JPL
791100	2019 NW_{116}	—	July 6, 2019	Cerro Tololo-DECam	DECam	·	970 m	MPC · JPL

== 791101–791200 ==
back to top

Designation			Discovery			Properties		Ref
Permanent	Provisional	Named after	Date	Site	Discoverer(s)	Category	Diam.	Ref
791101	2019 NT_{118}	—	July 7, 2019	Haleakala	Pan-STARRS 1	·	1.3 km	MPC · JPL
791102	2019 OV_{11}	—	July 26, 2019	Haleakala	Pan-STARRS 1	·	1.3 km	MPC · JPL
791103	2019 OE_{21}	—	September 20, 2015	Catalina	CSS	·	940 m	MPC · JPL
791104	2019 OA_{24}	—	July 11, 2010	WISE	WISE	·	860 m	MPC · JPL
791105	2019 OD_{24}	—	July 30, 2019	Haleakala	Pan-STARRS 2	·	1.8 km	MPC · JPL
791106	2019 OR_{26}	—	July 29, 2019	Haleakala	Pan-STARRS 2	L4	7.2 km	MPC · JPL
791107	2019 OS_{26}	—	April 17, 2015	Cerro Tololo	DECam	L4	6.2 km	MPC · JPL
791108	2019 OW_{27}	—	July 29, 2019	Haleakala	Pan-STARRS 2	L4	6.5 km	MPC · JPL
791109	2019 OT_{28}	—	July 26, 2019	Haleakala	Pan-STARRS 1	·	1.2 km	MPC · JPL
791110	2019 OA_{32}	—	July 28, 2019	Haleakala	Pan-STARRS 2	L4	6.9 km	MPC · JPL
791111	2019 OB_{32}	—	July 28, 2019	Haleakala	Pan-STARRS 1	L4 · 006	7.0 km	MPC · JPL
791112	2019 OX_{33}	—	July 26, 2019	Haleakala	Pan-STARRS 1	·	820 m	MPC · JPL
791113	2019 OC_{34}	—	April 29, 2014	Haleakala	Pan-STARRS 1	·	1.3 km	MPC · JPL
791114	2019 OL_{36}	—	May 1, 2016	Cerro Tololo	DECam	L4	4.8 km	MPC · JPL
791115	2019 OY_{36}	—	July 28, 2019	Haleakala	Pan-STARRS 1	L4	6.3 km	MPC · JPL
791116	2019 OJ_{37}	—	July 25, 2019	Haleakala	Pan-STARRS 1	·	2.1 km	MPC · JPL
791117	2019 OW_{37}	—	February 9, 2013	Haleakala	Pan-STARRS 1	·	1.2 km	MPC · JPL
791118	2019 OZ_{38}	—	July 26, 2019	Haleakala	Pan-STARRS 1	L4	6.1 km	MPC · JPL
791119	2019 OC_{39}	—	July 1, 2019	Haleakala	Pan-STARRS 1	L4	5.4 km	MPC · JPL
791120	2019 OW_{39}	—	July 28, 2019	Haleakala	Pan-STARRS 1	L4	6.2 km	MPC · JPL
791121	2019 OA_{40}	—	April 18, 2015	Cerro Tololo	DECam	L4	5.1 km	MPC · JPL
791122	2019 OP_{41}	—	April 25, 2014	Mount Lemmon	Mount Lemmon Survey	·	890 m	MPC · JPL
791123	2019 OA_{46}	—	July 25, 2019	Haleakala	Pan-STARRS 1	L4	5.4 km	MPC · JPL
791124	2019 PW_{10}	—	May 5, 2014	Haleakala	Pan-STARRS 1	·	1.3 km	MPC · JPL
791125	2019 PZ_{17}	—	August 9, 2019	Haleakala	Pan-STARRS 2	·	1.2 km	MPC · JPL
791126	2019 PO_{32}	—	August 12, 2019	Haleakala	Pan-STARRS 1	·	1.4 km	MPC · JPL
791127	2019 PR_{32}	—	August 5, 2019	Haleakala	Pan-STARRS 1	·	1.3 km	MPC · JPL
791128	2019 PD_{34}	—	August 8, 2019	Haleakala	Pan-STARRS 1	HNS	660 m	MPC · JPL
791129	2019 PG_{35}	—	August 5, 2019	Haleakala	Pan-STARRS 1	·	730 m	MPC · JPL
791130	2019 PV_{35}	—	August 7, 2019	Haleakala	Pan-STARRS 2	EOS	1.4 km	MPC · JPL
791131	2019 PL_{36}	—	August 5, 2019	Haleakala	Pan-STARRS 1	L4	6.6 km	MPC · JPL
791132	2019 PR_{41}	—	September 25, 2009	Kitt Peak	Spacewatch	L4	5.5 km	MPC · JPL
791133	2019 PS_{41}	—	April 30, 2016	Haleakala	Pan-STARRS 1	L4	5.4 km	MPC · JPL
791134	2019 PJ_{45}	—	August 8, 2019	Haleakala	Pan-STARRS 1	·	2.3 km	MPC · JPL
791135	2019 PO_{45}	—	April 18, 2015	Cerro Tololo	DECam	L4	5.3 km	MPC · JPL
791136	2019 PP_{51}	—	August 8, 2019	Haleakala	Pan-STARRS 1	EOS	1.2 km	MPC · JPL
791137	2019 PH_{56}	—	August 6, 2019	Cerro Paranal	Altmann, M., Prusti, T.	·	890 m	MPC · JPL
791138	2019 PP_{61}	—	August 5, 2019	Haleakala	Pan-STARRS 1	L4	6.0 km	MPC · JPL
791139	2019 PN_{67}	—	July 8, 2018	Haleakala	Pan-STARRS 1	L4	5.4 km	MPC · JPL
791140	2019 PS_{67}	—	August 8, 2019	Haleakala	Pan-STARRS 1	·	1.2 km	MPC · JPL
791141	2019 PB_{68}	—	August 8, 2019	Haleakala	Pan-STARRS 1	L4	5.5 km	MPC · JPL
791142	2019 PF_{68}	—	August 5, 2019	Haleakala	Pan-STARRS 1	L4	5.8 km	MPC · JPL
791143	2019 PL_{68}	—	August 12, 2019	Haleakala	Pan-STARRS 1	L4	6.6 km	MPC · JPL
791144	2019 PP_{68}	—	April 18, 2015	Cerro Tololo	DECam	L4 · ERY	5.4 km	MPC · JPL
791145	2019 PR_{68}	—	August 9, 2019	Haleakala	Pan-STARRS 1	L4 · ERY	6.3 km	MPC · JPL
791146	2019 PT_{68}	—	August 9, 2019	Haleakala	Pan-STARRS 1	EUN	820 m	MPC · JPL
791147	2019 PV_{68}	—	August 7, 2019	Haleakala	Pan-STARRS 1	EUN	710 m	MPC · JPL
791148	2019 PO_{69}	—	January 2, 2017	Haleakala	Pan-STARRS 1	EUN	720 m	MPC · JPL
791149	2019 PD_{70}	—	January 3, 2017	Haleakala	Pan-STARRS 1	·	1.4 km	MPC · JPL
791150	2019 PN_{70}	—	April 18, 2015	Cerro Tololo	DECam	L4	5.4 km	MPC · JPL
791151	2019 PT_{70}	—	August 8, 2019	Haleakala	Pan-STARRS 1	L4	6.4 km	MPC · JPL
791152	2019 PC_{71}	—	August 5, 2019	Haleakala	Pan-STARRS 1	L4	6.2 km	MPC · JPL
791153	2019 PH_{71}	—	August 4, 2019	Haleakala	Pan-STARRS 1	·	1.1 km	MPC · JPL
791154	2019 PN_{71}	—	August 8, 2019	Haleakala	Pan-STARRS 1	·	1.3 km	MPC · JPL
791155	2019 PK_{76}	—	August 8, 2019	Haleakala	Pan-STARRS 1	L4	6.3 km	MPC · JPL
791156	2019 PU_{83}	—	August 8, 2019	Haleakala	Pan-STARRS 2	·	1.3 km	MPC · JPL
791157	2019 PY_{88}	—	August 9, 2019	Haleakala	Pan-STARRS 1	·	1.2 km	MPC · JPL
791158	2019 PZ_{88}	—	August 9, 2019	Haleakala	Pan-STARRS 1	·	1.1 km	MPC · JPL
791159	2019 PB_{95}	—	August 8, 2019	Haleakala	Pan-STARRS 1	·	1.4 km	MPC · JPL
791160	2019 PX_{97}	—	August 8, 2019	Haleakala	Pan-STARRS 2	·	1.3 km	MPC · JPL
791161	2019 QY_{2}	—	January 27, 2017	Haleakala	Pan-STARRS 1	·	1.6 km	MPC · JPL
791162	2019 QW_{6}	—	September 21, 2006	Catalina	CSS	·	1.3 km	MPC · JPL
791163	2019 QX_{10}	—	May 7, 2014	Haleakala	Pan-STARRS 1	·	1.1 km	MPC · JPL
791164	2019 QE_{14}	—	August 27, 2019	Mount Lemmon	Mount Lemmon Survey	EUN	880 m	MPC · JPL
791165	2019 QE_{19}	—	August 27, 2019	Mount Lemmon	Mount Lemmon Survey	·	1.0 km	MPC · JPL
791166	2019 QU_{30}	—	August 25, 2019	Haleakala	Pan-STARRS 2	JUN	860 m	MPC · JPL
791167	2019 QA_{31}	—	August 21, 2019	Mount Lemmon	Mount Lemmon Survey	·	990 m	MPC · JPL
791168	2019 QN_{31}	—	August 27, 2019	Mount Lemmon	Mount Lemmon Survey	·	1.3 km	MPC · JPL
791169	2019 QB_{32}	—	August 27, 2019	Mount Lemmon	Mount Lemmon Survey	EUN	890 m	MPC · JPL
791170	2019 QT_{32}	—	August 27, 2019	Mount Lemmon	Mount Lemmon Survey	·	1.0 km	MPC · JPL
791171	2019 QD_{33}	—	August 28, 2019	ESA OGS	ESA OGS	·	1.2 km	MPC · JPL
791172	2019 QR_{44}	—	February 14, 2013	Haleakala	Pan-STARRS 1	·	1.1 km	MPC · JPL
791173	2019 QS_{49}	—	August 21, 2019	Mount Lemmon	Mount Lemmon Survey	·	1.9 km	MPC · JPL
791174	2019 QW_{49}	—	August 23, 2019	Haleakala	Pan-STARRS 1	·	2.1 km	MPC · JPL
791175	2019 QB_{50}	—	August 23, 2019	Haleakala	Pan-STARRS 2	HNS	1 km	MPC · JPL
791176	2019 QH_{50}	—	August 27, 2019	Mount Lemmon	Mount Lemmon Survey	EUN	1.0 km	MPC · JPL
791177	2019 QO_{57}	—	August 27, 2019	Mount Lemmon	Mount Lemmon Survey	·	1.1 km	MPC · JPL
791178	2019 QM_{66}	—	August 29, 2019	Haleakala	Pan-STARRS 1	(5)	630 m	MPC · JPL
791179	2019 QM_{72}	—	August 26, 2019	Haleakala	Pan-STARRS 2	·	1.5 km	MPC · JPL
791180	2019 QO_{74}	—	August 28, 2019	Haleakala	Pan-STARRS 1	L4	5.9 km	MPC · JPL
791181	2019 QZ_{76}	—	January 13, 2016	Haleakala	Pan-STARRS 1	·	1.1 km	MPC · JPL
791182	2019 QO_{79}	—	August 24, 2019	Haleakala	Pan-STARRS 1	HOF	2.0 km	MPC · JPL
791183	2019 QW_{79}	—	August 31, 2019	Haleakala	Pan-STARRS 1	L4	5.6 km	MPC · JPL
791184	2019 QO_{94}	—	February 14, 2012	Haleakala	Pan-STARRS 1	·	1.2 km	MPC · JPL
791185	2019 QK_{115}	—	August 28, 2019	Haleakala	Pan-STARRS 1	L4	5.0 km	MPC · JPL
791186	2019 QM_{115}	—	August 29, 2019	Haleakala	Pan-STARRS 1	L4 · ERY	4.7 km	MPC · JPL
791187	2019 RK_{19}	—	July 14, 2013	Haleakala	Pan-STARRS 1	·	1.5 km	MPC · JPL
791188	2019 RJ_{20}	—	September 4, 2019	Mount Lemmon	Mount Lemmon Survey	·	930 m	MPC · JPL
791189	2019 RO_{22}	—	December 4, 2015	Kitt Peak	Spacewatch	·	1.1 km	MPC · JPL
791190	2019 RN_{28}	—	September 4, 2019	Mount Lemmon	Mount Lemmon Survey	·	1.8 km	MPC · JPL
791191	2019 RO_{28}	—	September 7, 2019	Mount Lemmon	Mount Lemmon Survey	·	1.2 km	MPC · JPL
791192	2019 RP_{28}	—	September 6, 2019	Haleakala	Pan-STARRS 1	PAD	1.2 km	MPC · JPL
791193	2019 RX_{28}	—	September 5, 2019	Mount Lemmon	Mount Lemmon Survey	·	2.0 km	MPC · JPL
791194	2019 RB_{29}	—	September 6, 2019	Haleakala	Pan-STARRS 1	·	1.2 km	MPC · JPL
791195	2019 RK_{29}	—	September 4, 2019	Mount Lemmon	Mount Lemmon Survey	EOS	1.5 km	MPC · JPL
791196	2019 RE_{30}	—	September 4, 2019	Haleakala	Pan-STARRS 1	·	1.3 km	MPC · JPL
791197	2019 RG_{30}	—	September 6, 2019	Haleakala	Pan-STARRS 1	·	1.2 km	MPC · JPL
791198	2019 RM_{30}	—	September 6, 2019	Haleakala	Pan-STARRS 1	·	1.3 km	MPC · JPL
791199	2019 RF_{31}	—	September 3, 2019	Mount Lemmon	Mount Lemmon Survey	·	1.4 km	MPC · JPL
791200	2019 RY_{32}	—	September 6, 2019	Haleakala	Pan-STARRS 1	·	1.5 km	MPC · JPL

== 791201–791300 ==
back to top

Designation			Discovery			Properties		Ref
Permanent	Provisional	Named after	Date	Site	Discoverer(s)	Category	Diam.	Ref
791201	2019 RL_{33}	—	September 10, 2019	Haleakala	Pan-STARRS 1	·	1.2 km	MPC · JPL
791202	2019 RM_{33}	—	September 6, 2019	Haleakala	Pan-STARRS 1	·	1.2 km	MPC · JPL
791203	2019 RF_{34}	—	September 4, 2019	Haleakala	Pan-STARRS 1	EUN	730 m	MPC · JPL
791204	2019 RT_{42}	—	August 28, 2014	Haleakala	Pan-STARRS 1	·	1.3 km	MPC · JPL
791205	2019 RE_{43}	—	September 6, 2019	Haleakala	Pan-STARRS 1	·	1.7 km	MPC · JPL
791206	2019 RS_{48}	—	September 6, 2019	Haleakala	Pan-STARRS 1	·	800 m	MPC · JPL
791207	2019 RT_{48}	—	September 6, 2019	Haleakala	Pan-STARRS 1	·	880 m	MPC · JPL
791208	2019 RY_{48}	—	April 13, 2010	WISE	WISE	·	2.3 km	MPC · JPL
791209	2019 RP_{54}	—	November 16, 2006	Kitt Peak	Spacewatch	·	1.2 km	MPC · JPL
791210	2019 RH_{56}	—	August 18, 2006	Kitt Peak	Spacewatch	·	1.2 km	MPC · JPL
791211	2019 RO_{57}	—	September 5, 2019	Mount Lemmon	Mount Lemmon Survey	·	1.0 km	MPC · JPL
791212	2019 RV_{58}	—	September 4, 2019	Haleakala	Pan-STARRS 1	·	1.9 km	MPC · JPL
791213	2019 RP_{59}	—	September 4, 2019	Mount Lemmon	Mount Lemmon Survey	·	1.4 km	MPC · JPL
791214	2019 RF_{61}	—	September 6, 2019	Haleakala	Pan-STARRS 1	·	930 m	MPC · JPL
791215	2019 RO_{62}	—	September 6, 2019	Haleakala	Pan-STARRS 1	·	1.1 km	MPC · JPL
791216	2019 RZ_{62}	—	September 4, 2019	Mount Lemmon	Mount Lemmon Survey	ADE	1.1 km	MPC · JPL
791217	2019 RE_{63}	—	September 6, 2019	Haleakala	Pan-STARRS 1	·	1.7 km	MPC · JPL
791218	2019 RZ_{72}	—	September 4, 2019	Mount Lemmon	Mount Lemmon Survey	EOS	1.2 km	MPC · JPL
791219	2019 RD_{77}	—	September 6, 2019	Mount Lemmon	Mount Lemmon Survey	L4	5.8 km	MPC · JPL
791220	2019 RA_{84}	—	September 6, 2019	Haleakala	Pan-STARRS 1	·	2.0 km	MPC · JPL
791221	2019 RO_{85}	—	September 7, 2019	Mount Lemmon	Mount Lemmon Survey	·	1.2 km	MPC · JPL
791222	2019 RU_{89}	—	December 14, 2015	Haleakala	Pan-STARRS 1	·	1.2 km	MPC · JPL
791223	2019 SV_{4}	—	September 26, 2019	Haleakala	ATLAS	ATE	200 m	MPC · JPL
791224	2019 SU_{17}	—	April 16, 2013	Cerro Tololo-DECam	DECam	EUN	770 m	MPC · JPL
791225	2019 SU_{18}	—	September 24, 2019	Haleakala	Pan-STARRS 1	·	1.1 km	MPC · JPL
791226	2019 SE_{22}	—	September 23, 2014	Haleakala	Pan-STARRS 1	·	1.3 km	MPC · JPL
791227	2019 SU_{24}	—	February 21, 2017	Haleakala	Pan-STARRS 1	·	1.2 km	MPC · JPL
791228	2019 SF_{26}	—	December 24, 2016	Haleakala	Pan-STARRS 1	·	1.0 km	MPC · JPL
791229	2019 SC_{38}	—	September 22, 2019	Mount Lemmon	Mount Lemmon Survey	EUN	810 m	MPC · JPL
791230	2019 SF_{49}	—	September 28, 2019	Mount Lemmon	Mount Lemmon Survey	·	940 m	MPC · JPL
791231	2019 SK_{52}	—	September 25, 2019	Haleakala	Pan-STARRS 1	·	960 m	MPC · JPL
791232	2019 SM_{59}	—	September 19, 2019	Haleakala	Pan-STARRS 1	·	1.1 km	MPC · JPL
791233	2019 SN_{61}	—	September 27, 2019	Haleakala	Pan-STARRS 1	·	1.1 km	MPC · JPL
791234	2019 SB_{65}	—	September 26, 2006	Kitt Peak	Spacewatch	·	1.2 km	MPC · JPL
791235	2019 SK_{65}	—	September 22, 2019	Mount Lemmon	Mount Lemmon Survey	HNS	820 m	MPC · JPL
791236	2019 SD_{66}	—	September 20, 2019	Mount Lemmon	Mount Lemmon Survey	·	1.1 km	MPC · JPL
791237	2019 SJ_{70}	—	September 30, 2019	Haleakala	Pan-STARRS 1	·	1.0 km	MPC · JPL
791238	2019 SL_{72}	—	January 19, 2015	Mount Lemmon	Mount Lemmon Survey	·	2.5 km	MPC · JPL
791239	2019 SW_{79}	—	September 28, 2019	Mount Lemmon	Mount Lemmon Survey	·	1.0 km	MPC · JPL
791240	2019 SJ_{80}	—	November 18, 2014	Haleakala	Pan-STARRS 1	EOS	1.1 km	MPC · JPL
791241	2019 SJ_{82}	—	September 27, 2019	Haleakala	Pan-STARRS 1	·	1.5 km	MPC · JPL
791242	2019 SQ_{82}	—	September 25, 2019	Haleakala	Pan-STARRS 1	EOS	1.4 km	MPC · JPL
791243	2019 SW_{82}	—	September 30, 2019	Haleakala	Pan-STARRS 1	MAR	760 m	MPC · JPL
791244	2019 SA_{83}	—	September 20, 2019	Mount Lemmon	Mount Lemmon Survey	·	1.5 km	MPC · JPL
791245	2019 SB_{83}	—	September 30, 2019	Mount Lemmon	Mount Lemmon Survey	·	1.8 km	MPC · JPL
791246	2019 SD_{83}	—	September 28, 2019	Mount Lemmon	Mount Lemmon Survey	·	2.5 km	MPC · JPL
791247	2019 SK_{83}	—	September 22, 2019	Mount Lemmon	Mount Lemmon Survey	·	1.3 km	MPC · JPL
791248	2019 SL_{83}	—	September 27, 2019	Haleakala	Pan-STARRS 1	MAR	730 m	MPC · JPL
791249	2019 SN_{83}	—	September 29, 2019	Haleakala	Pan-STARRS 1	·	1.3 km	MPC · JPL
791250	2019 ST_{83}	—	September 25, 2019	Haleakala	Pan-STARRS 1	·	1.6 km	MPC · JPL
791251	2019 SB_{84}	—	September 24, 2019	Haleakala	Pan-STARRS 1	VER	2.1 km	MPC · JPL
791252	2019 SJ_{84}	—	September 24, 2019	Haleakala	Pan-STARRS 1	·	750 m	MPC · JPL
791253	2019 SK_{84}	—	September 19, 2019	Haleakala	Pan-STARRS 1	·	1.0 km	MPC · JPL
791254	2019 ST_{84}	—	September 28, 2019	Mount Lemmon	Mount Lemmon Survey	·	1.1 km	MPC · JPL
791255	2019 SU_{84}	—	September 29, 2019	Haleakala	Pan-STARRS 1	ADE	1.3 km	MPC · JPL
791256	2019 SX_{84}	—	September 29, 2019	Haleakala	Pan-STARRS 1	EOS	1.1 km	MPC · JPL
791257	2019 SF_{85}	—	September 22, 2019	Mount Lemmon	Mount Lemmon Survey	·	1.1 km	MPC · JPL
791258	2019 SH_{85}	—	September 20, 2019	Mount Lemmon	Mount Lemmon Survey	·	1.1 km	MPC · JPL
791259	2019 SU_{85}	—	September 24, 2019	Haleakala	Pan-STARRS 1	WIT	670 m	MPC · JPL
791260	2019 SV_{85}	—	September 25, 2019	Haleakala	Pan-STARRS 1	·	1.4 km	MPC · JPL
791261	2019 SD_{86}	—	September 26, 2019	Haleakala	Pan-STARRS 1	EOS	1.3 km	MPC · JPL
791262	2019 SG_{86}	—	September 28, 2019	Mount Lemmon	Mount Lemmon Survey	·	2.3 km	MPC · JPL
791263	2019 SB_{87}	—	September 28, 2019	Mount Lemmon	Mount Lemmon Survey	·	1.9 km	MPC · JPL
791264	2019 SA_{88}	—	September 30, 2019	Haleakala	Pan-STARRS 1	HNS	690 m	MPC · JPL
791265	2019 SP_{88}	—	September 27, 2019	Haleakala	Pan-STARRS 1	·	2.4 km	MPC · JPL
791266	2019 SY_{88}	—	September 29, 2019	Haleakala	Pan-STARRS 1	·	1.6 km	MPC · JPL
791267	2019 SV_{89}	—	September 24, 2019	Haleakala	Pan-STARRS 1	·	1.2 km	MPC · JPL
791268	2019 SZ_{91}	—	September 24, 2019	Haleakala	Pan-STARRS 1	·	1.2 km	MPC · JPL
791269	2019 SB_{92}	—	September 24, 2019	Haleakala	Pan-STARRS 1	·	1.5 km	MPC · JPL
791270	2019 SM_{92}	—	September 22, 2019	Mount Lemmon	Mount Lemmon Survey	EUN	680 m	MPC · JPL
791271	2019 SN_{95}	—	February 11, 2016	Haleakala	Pan-STARRS 1	·	1.7 km	MPC · JPL
791272	2019 SP_{95}	—	October 11, 2010	Mount Lemmon	Mount Lemmon Survey	·	1.4 km	MPC · JPL
791273	2019 SF_{98}	—	March 7, 2016	Haleakala	Pan-STARRS 1	·	2.3 km	MPC · JPL
791274	2019 SB_{105}	—	January 11, 2010	Kitt Peak	Spacewatch	·	2.3 km	MPC · JPL
791275	2019 SF_{105}	—	September 30, 2019	Mount Lemmon	Mount Lemmon Survey	·	1.6 km	MPC · JPL
791276	2019 SJ_{106}	—	September 24, 2019	Haleakala	Pan-STARRS 1	·	980 m	MPC · JPL
791277	2019 SW_{109}	—	September 28, 2019	Mount Lemmon	Mount Lemmon Survey	·	2.4 km	MPC · JPL
791278	2019 SH_{118}	—	January 30, 2017	Mount Lemmon	Mount Lemmon Survey	·	890 m	MPC · JPL
791279	2019 SK_{121}	—	January 27, 2004	Kitt Peak	Spacewatch	·	880 m	MPC · JPL
791280	2019 SX_{136}	—	September 30, 2019	Mount Lemmon	Mount Lemmon Survey	·	1.1 km	MPC · JPL
791281	2019 SY_{136}	—	February 4, 2009	Mount Lemmon	Mount Lemmon Survey	·	860 m	MPC · JPL
791282	2019 SD_{144}	—	September 28, 2019	Mount Lemmon	Mount Lemmon Survey	·	940 m	MPC · JPL
791283	2019 SZ_{148}	—	September 26, 2019	Haleakala	Pan-STARRS 1	·	1.1 km	MPC · JPL
791284	2019 SG_{149}	—	September 30, 2019	Mount Lemmon	Mount Lemmon Survey	·	1.1 km	MPC · JPL
791285	2019 SZ_{149}	—	September 27, 2019	Haleakala	Pan-STARRS 1	BRA	920 m	MPC · JPL
791286	2019 SW_{151}	—	September 28, 2019	Mount Lemmon	Mount Lemmon Survey	EUN	750 m	MPC · JPL
791287	2019 SK_{155}	—	September 30, 2019	Mount Lemmon	Mount Lemmon Survey	ADE	1.1 km	MPC · JPL
791288	2019 SS_{155}	—	September 25, 2019	Mount Lemmon	Mount Lemmon Survey	MAR	750 m	MPC · JPL
791289	2019 SE_{156}	—	September 28, 2019	Mount Lemmon	Mount Lemmon Survey	·	1.8 km	MPC · JPL
791290	2019 SF_{158}	—	November 30, 2003	Kitt Peak	Spacewatch	(5)	680 m	MPC · JPL
791291	2019 SJ_{166}	—	September 24, 2019	Haleakala	Pan-STARRS 1	ADE	1.1 km	MPC · JPL
791292	2019 SR_{166}	—	September 30, 2019	Mount Lemmon	Mount Lemmon Survey	·	1.1 km	MPC · JPL
791293	2019 SF_{167}	—	September 30, 2019	Mount Lemmon	Mount Lemmon Survey	·	1.1 km	MPC · JPL
791294	2019 SF_{174}	—	November 2, 2007	Mount Lemmon	Mount Lemmon Survey	(5)	650 m	MPC · JPL
791295	2019 SJ_{174}	—	September 26, 2019	Haleakala	Pan-STARRS 1	HNS	700 m	MPC · JPL
791296	2019 SM_{177}	—	January 28, 2017	Haleakala	Pan-STARRS 1	(5)	860 m	MPC · JPL
791297	2019 ST_{177}	—	July 8, 2014	Haleakala	Pan-STARRS 1	·	1.2 km	MPC · JPL
791298	2019 SU_{177}	—	April 18, 2015	Cerro Tololo	DECam	L4	5.7 km	MPC · JPL
791299	2019 SG_{178}	—	September 27, 2019	Haleakala	Pan-STARRS 1	·	1.0 km	MPC · JPL
791300	2019 SA_{179}	—	September 28, 2019	Mount Lemmon	Mount Lemmon Survey	·	1.4 km	MPC · JPL

== 791301–791400 ==
back to top

Designation			Discovery			Properties		Ref
Permanent	Provisional	Named after	Date	Site	Discoverer(s)	Category	Diam.	Ref
791301	2019 SG_{179}	—	September 24, 2019	Haleakala	Pan-STARRS 1	·	1.8 km	MPC · JPL
791302	2019 SU_{179}	—	September 26, 2019	Haleakala	Pan-STARRS 1	(5)	790 m	MPC · JPL
791303	2019 SJ_{184}	—	September 24, 2019	Haleakala	Pan-STARRS 1	·	2.2 km	MPC · JPL
791304	2019 SO_{185}	—	September 26, 2019	Haleakala	Pan-STARRS 1	L4	6.2 km	MPC · JPL
791305	2019 SP_{185}	—	September 28, 2019	Haleakala	Pan-STARRS 1	L4	5.7 km	MPC · JPL
791306	2019 ST_{185}	—	September 24, 2019	Haleakala	Pan-STARRS 1	·	1.9 km	MPC · JPL
791307	2019 SC_{186}	—	September 22, 2019	Haleakala	Pan-STARRS 1	L4	6.1 km	MPC · JPL
791308	2019 SD_{186}	—	July 12, 2013	Haleakala	Pan-STARRS 1	·	1.6 km	MPC · JPL
791309	2019 SA_{187}	—	September 26, 2019	Haleakala	Pan-STARRS 1	·	1.4 km	MPC · JPL
791310	2019 ST_{189}	—	April 1, 2017	Haleakala	Pan-STARRS 1	·	2.3 km	MPC · JPL
791311	2019 SA_{190}	—	September 20, 2019	Mount Lemmon	Mount Lemmon Survey	·	780 m	MPC · JPL
791312	2019 SV_{190}	—	March 20, 2017	Mount Lemmon	Mount Lemmon Survey	·	1.3 km	MPC · JPL
791313	2019 SL_{194}	—	December 8, 2015	Mount Lemmon	Mount Lemmon Survey	KOR	1.0 km	MPC · JPL
791314	2019 SS_{204}	—	September 26, 2019	Haleakala	Pan-STARRS 1	·	1.1 km	MPC · JPL
791315	2019 SN_{205}	—	September 27, 2019	Haleakala	Pan-STARRS 1	·	870 m	MPC · JPL
791316	2019 SV_{216}	—	October 29, 2014	Haleakala	Pan-STARRS 1	EOS	1.3 km	MPC · JPL
791317	2019 SR_{218}	—	September 16, 2009	Mount Lemmon	Mount Lemmon Survey	KOR	1.0 km	MPC · JPL
791318	2019 SL_{221}	—	September 30, 2019	Mount Lemmon	Mount Lemmon Survey	WIT	680 m	MPC · JPL
791319	2019 SU_{231}	—	September 30, 2019	Mount Lemmon	Mount Lemmon Survey	·	970 m	MPC · JPL
791320	2019 SO_{238}	—	September 20, 2019	Mount Lemmon	Mount Lemmon Survey	L4	6.8 km	MPC · JPL
791321	2019 SX_{246}	—	September 27, 2019	Haleakala	Pan-STARRS 1	KOR	940 m	MPC · JPL
791322	2019 SB_{251}	—	September 20, 2019	Mount Lemmon	Mount Lemmon Survey	·	1.6 km	MPC · JPL
791323	2019 SN_{270}	—	September 24, 2019	Haleakala	Pan-STARRS 1	·	1.4 km	MPC · JPL
791324	2019 TP_{9}	—	October 5, 2019	Haleakala	Pan-STARRS 2	RAF	630 m	MPC · JPL
791325	2019 TQ_{9}	—	December 3, 2015	Haleakala	Pan-STARRS 1	(1547)	940 m	MPC · JPL
791326	2019 TU_{9}	—	October 16, 2015	Mount Lemmon	Mount Lemmon Survey	·	1.0 km	MPC · JPL
791327	2019 TF_{14}	—	October 8, 2019	Mount Lemmon	Mount Lemmon Survey	·	1.5 km	MPC · JPL
791328	2019 TH_{15}	—	October 8, 2019	Mount Lemmon	Mount Lemmon Survey	EOS	1.3 km	MPC · JPL
791329	2019 TV_{15}	—	November 22, 2006	Kitt Peak	Spacewatch	·	1.1 km	MPC · JPL
791330	2019 TQ_{20}	—	October 5, 2019	Haleakala	Pan-STARRS 2	·	1.1 km	MPC · JPL
791331	2019 TW_{25}	—	October 22, 2014	Mount Lemmon	Mount Lemmon Survey	·	1.6 km	MPC · JPL
791332	2019 TW_{30}	—	October 6, 2019	Haleakala	Pan-STARRS 1	EUN	690 m	MPC · JPL
791333	2019 TO_{32}	—	October 7, 2019	Mount Lemmon	Mount Lemmon Survey	HNS	900 m	MPC · JPL
791334	2019 TH_{34}	—	October 5, 2019	Haleakala	Pan-STARRS 1	·	2.2 km	MPC · JPL
791335	2019 TK_{34}	—	October 5, 2019	Haleakala	Pan-STARRS 1	·	1.6 km	MPC · JPL
791336	2019 TM_{34}	—	October 9, 2019	Haleakala	Pan-STARRS 1	·	2.1 km	MPC · JPL
791337	2019 TU_{34}	—	October 7, 2019	Haleakala	Pan-STARRS 1	VER	2.1 km	MPC · JPL
791338	2019 TV_{34}	—	October 5, 2019	Haleakala	Pan-STARRS 2	EOS	1.2 km	MPC · JPL
791339	2019 TL_{35}	—	October 5, 2019	Haleakala	Pan-STARRS 1	·	1.1 km	MPC · JPL
791340	2019 TM_{35}	—	October 5, 2019	Haleakala	Pan-STARRS 1	·	1.3 km	MPC · JPL
791341	2019 TP_{35}	—	October 5, 2019	Haleakala	Pan-STARRS 1	·	1.9 km	MPC · JPL
791342	2019 TW_{35}	—	October 8, 2019	Haleakala	Pan-STARRS 1	·	1.2 km	MPC · JPL
791343	2019 TG_{36}	—	October 8, 2019	Haleakala	Pan-STARRS 1	·	950 m	MPC · JPL
791344	2019 TK_{36}	—	October 8, 2019	Mount Lemmon	Mount Lemmon Survey	·	2.1 km	MPC · JPL
791345	2019 TF_{37}	—	October 5, 2019	Haleakala	Pan-STARRS 1	·	1.2 km	MPC · JPL
791346	2019 TK_{37}	—	October 10, 2019	Mount Lemmon	Mount Lemmon Survey	·	1.2 km	MPC · JPL
791347	2019 TW_{38}	—	April 20, 2017	Haleakala	Pan-STARRS 1	VER	1.9 km	MPC · JPL
791348	2019 TR_{40}	—	October 7, 2019	Haleakala	Pan-STARRS 1	EOS	1.3 km	MPC · JPL
791349	2019 TZ_{40}	—	October 5, 2019	Haleakala	Pan-STARRS 1	·	1.5 km	MPC · JPL
791350	2019 TO_{42}	—	January 21, 2012	Kitt Peak	Spacewatch	·	1.1 km	MPC · JPL
791351	2019 TN_{43}	—	October 6, 2019	Haleakala	Pan-STARRS 1	·	1.4 km	MPC · JPL
791352	2019 TY_{45}	—	October 8, 2019	Mount Lemmon	Mount Lemmon Survey	·	1.9 km	MPC · JPL
791353	2019 TV_{51}	—	January 2, 2016	Mount Lemmon	Mount Lemmon Survey	EOS	1.6 km	MPC · JPL
791354	2019 TL_{52}	—	February 7, 2011	Mount Lemmon	Mount Lemmon Survey	EOS	1.4 km	MPC · JPL
791355	2019 TH_{66}	—	October 5, 2019	Haleakala	Pan-STARRS 1	·	1.3 km	MPC · JPL
791356	2019 TV_{66}	—	October 8, 2019	Haleakala	Pan-STARRS 1	·	1.4 km	MPC · JPL
791357	2019 TY_{66}	—	October 7, 2019	Mount Lemmon	Mount Lemmon Survey	BAR	870 m	MPC · JPL
791358	2019 TH_{67}	—	October 8, 2019	Mount Lemmon	Mount Lemmon Survey	TEL	960 m	MPC · JPL
791359	2019 TQ_{72}	—	January 11, 2016	Haleakala	Pan-STARRS 1	·	2.1 km	MPC · JPL
791360	2019 TG_{74}	—	October 7, 2019	Mount Lemmon	Mount Lemmon Survey	HNS	760 m	MPC · JPL
791361	2019 TG_{76}	—	October 3, 2019	Mount Lemmon	Mount Lemmon Survey	·	780 m	MPC · JPL
791362	2019 TJ_{77}	—	October 5, 2019	Haleakala	Pan-STARRS 2	EOS	1.4 km	MPC · JPL
791363	2019 TK_{77}	—	August 31, 2014	Haleakala	Pan-STARRS 1	GAL	1.1 km	MPC · JPL
791364	2019 TZ_{77}	—	October 5, 2019	Haleakala	Pan-STARRS 2	KOR	1 km	MPC · JPL
791365	2019 TY_{78}	—	October 10, 2019	Mount Lemmon	Mount Lemmon Survey	GAL	1.1 km	MPC · JPL
791366	2019 TP_{79}	—	October 8, 2019	Mount Lemmon	Mount Lemmon Survey	·	880 m	MPC · JPL
791367	2019 TD_{80}	—	May 6, 2014	Haleakala	Pan-STARRS 1	·	930 m	MPC · JPL
791368	2019 TZ_{80}	—	October 5, 2019	Haleakala	Pan-STARRS 1	MAR	710 m	MPC · JPL
791369	2019 TA_{82}	—	October 3, 2019	Mount Lemmon	Mount Lemmon Survey	·	1.7 km	MPC · JPL
791370	2019 TM_{83}	—	September 29, 2019	Mount Lemmon	Mount Lemmon Survey	·	1.1 km	MPC · JPL
791371	2019 TV_{84}	—	October 1, 2019	Mount Lemmon	Mount Lemmon Survey	EMA	2.1 km	MPC · JPL
791372	2019 TR_{89}	—	October 5, 2019	Haleakala	Pan-STARRS 2	·	1.2 km	MPC · JPL
791373	2019 TB_{94}	—	January 8, 2011	Mount Lemmon	Mount Lemmon Survey	·	1.5 km	MPC · JPL
791374	2019 TX_{94}	—	October 8, 2019	Mount Lemmon	Mount Lemmon Survey	·	1.8 km	MPC · JPL
791375	2019 TC_{98}	—	October 1, 2014	Haleakala	Pan-STARRS 1	·	1.4 km	MPC · JPL
791376	2019 UB_{15}	—	September 1, 2013	Mount Lemmon	Mount Lemmon Survey	·	2.1 km	MPC · JPL
791377	2019 UE_{19}	—	October 23, 2019	Haleakala	Pan-STARRS 1	·	1.4 km	MPC · JPL
791378	2019 UB_{20}	—	May 8, 2013	Haleakala	Pan-STARRS 1	·	1.2 km	MPC · JPL
791379	2019 UP_{20}	—	October 9, 2019	Mount Lemmon	Mount Lemmon Survey	·	1.2 km	MPC · JPL
791380	2019 UE_{21}	—	October 24, 2019	Mount Lemmon	Mount Lemmon Survey	·	1.5 km	MPC · JPL
791381	2019 UU_{22}	—	April 27, 2012	Haleakala	Pan-STARRS 1	·	1.7 km	MPC · JPL
791382	2019 UK_{23}	—	December 29, 2011	Mount Lemmon	Mount Lemmon Survey	·	1.1 km	MPC · JPL
791383	2019 UY_{23}	—	October 24, 2019	Haleakala	Pan-STARRS 1	·	1.4 km	MPC · JPL
791384	2019 UY_{24}	—	October 29, 2005	Kitt Peak	Spacewatch	·	1.4 km	MPC · JPL
791385	2019 UU_{31}	—	October 24, 2019	Mount Lemmon	Mount Lemmon Survey	·	1.2 km	MPC · JPL
791386	2019 UX_{31}	—	October 1, 2010	Mount Lemmon	Mount Lemmon Survey	·	1.0 km	MPC · JPL
791387	2019 UW_{32}	—	October 27, 2019	Haleakala	Pan-STARRS 2	·	1.7 km	MPC · JPL
791388	2019 UL_{33}	—	October 24, 2019	Haleakala	Pan-STARRS 1	PAD	1.1 km	MPC · JPL
791389	2019 UM_{33}	—	October 24, 2019	Haleakala	Pan-STARRS 1	·	1.2 km	MPC · JPL
791390	2019 UN_{33}	—	October 23, 2019	Mount Lemmon	Mount Lemmon Survey	EOS	1.5 km	MPC · JPL
791391	2019 UW_{33}	—	October 24, 2019	Haleakala	Pan-STARRS 1	GEF	920 m	MPC · JPL
791392	2019 UX_{33}	—	October 24, 2019	Haleakala	Pan-STARRS 1	·	970 m	MPC · JPL
791393	2019 UY_{33}	—	March 31, 2016	Haleakala	Pan-STARRS 1	·	1.7 km	MPC · JPL
791394	2019 UB_{34}	—	October 24, 2019	Mount Lemmon	Mount Lemmon Survey	·	1 km	MPC · JPL
791395	2019 UE_{34}	—	April 3, 2016	Haleakala	Pan-STARRS 1	·	2.2 km	MPC · JPL
791396	2019 UJ_{34}	—	October 23, 2019	Mount Lemmon	Mount Lemmon Survey	·	920 m	MPC · JPL
791397	2019 UL_{34}	—	October 20, 2019	Mount Lemmon	Mount Lemmon Survey	·	1.3 km	MPC · JPL
791398	2019 UP_{34}	—	October 27, 2019	Haleakala	Pan-STARRS 1	·	2.1 km	MPC · JPL
791399	2019 UZ_{34}	—	October 26, 2019	Haleakala	Pan-STARRS 1	·	850 m	MPC · JPL
791400	2019 UB_{35}	—	October 23, 2019	Mount Lemmon	Mount Lemmon Survey	·	1.3 km	MPC · JPL

== 791401–791500 ==
back to top

Designation			Discovery			Properties		Ref
Permanent	Provisional	Named after	Date	Site	Discoverer(s)	Category	Diam.	Ref
791401	2019 UG_{35}	—	October 24, 2019	Mount Lemmon	Mount Lemmon Survey	·	1.5 km	MPC · JPL
791402	2019 UV_{35}	—	October 24, 2019	Mount Lemmon	Mount Lemmon Survey	·	1.3 km	MPC · JPL
791403	2019 UG_{36}	—	October 25, 2019	Haleakala	Pan-STARRS 1	HNS	760 m	MPC · JPL
791404	2019 UK_{36}	—	October 23, 2019	Haleakala	Pan-STARRS 1	·	1.7 km	MPC · JPL
791405	2019 UR_{36}	—	October 26, 2019	Haleakala	Pan-STARRS 1	·	1.3 km	MPC · JPL
791406	2019 US_{37}	—	October 23, 2019	Haleakala	Pan-STARRS 1	MAR	850 m	MPC · JPL
791407	2019 UU_{37}	—	October 24, 2019	Haleakala	Pan-STARRS 1	EOS	1.2 km	MPC · JPL
791408	2019 UZ_{37}	—	October 26, 2019	Mount Lemmon	Mount Lemmon Survey	GEF	690 m	MPC · JPL
791409	2019 UG_{40}	—	April 30, 2006	Kitt Peak	Spacewatch	·	2.3 km	MPC · JPL
791410	2019 UL_{48}	—	October 24, 2019	Mount Lemmon	Mount Lemmon Survey	·	830 m	MPC · JPL
791411	2019 UP_{48}	—	October 24, 2019	Haleakala	Pan-STARRS 1	·	1.5 km	MPC · JPL
791412	2019 UW_{51}	—	October 23, 2019	Haleakala	Pan-STARRS 1	·	1.8 km	MPC · JPL
791413	2019 UV_{52}	—	October 24, 2019	Haleakala	Pan-STARRS 1	·	1.9 km	MPC · JPL
791414	2019 UL_{56}	—	December 18, 2015	Mount Lemmon	Mount Lemmon Survey	·	890 m	MPC · JPL
791415	2019 UN_{57}	—	May 27, 2014	Haleakala	Pan-STARRS 1	·	820 m	MPC · JPL
791416	2019 UK_{58}	—	July 13, 2013	Haleakala	Pan-STARRS 1	·	1.1 km	MPC · JPL
791417	2019 UF_{59}	—	February 3, 2016	Mount Lemmon	Mount Lemmon Survey	·	2.0 km	MPC · JPL
791418	2019 UM_{60}	—	October 22, 2019	Mount Lemmon	Mount Lemmon Survey	·	1.1 km	MPC · JPL
791419	2019 UZ_{60}	—	October 23, 2019	Mount Lemmon	Mount Lemmon Survey	·	1.0 km	MPC · JPL
791420	2019 UL_{61}	—	October 24, 2019	Mount Lemmon	Mount Lemmon Survey	·	1.5 km	MPC · JPL
791421	2019 UP_{61}	—	July 12, 2018	Haleakala	Pan-STARRS 1	·	2.1 km	MPC · JPL
791422	2019 UK_{66}	—	October 24, 2019	Haleakala	Pan-STARRS 1	·	1.4 km	MPC · JPL
791423	2019 UK_{67}	—	December 8, 2015	Haleakala	Pan-STARRS 1	EUN	830 m	MPC · JPL
791424	2019 UR_{69}	—	January 14, 2016	Haleakala	Pan-STARRS 1	·	2.4 km	MPC · JPL
791425	2019 UJ_{73}	—	March 7, 2017	Haleakala	Pan-STARRS 1	·	1.0 km	MPC · JPL
791426	2019 UT_{83}	—	October 22, 2019	Mount Lemmon	Mount Lemmon Survey	·	1.3 km	MPC · JPL
791427	2019 UF_{87}	—	October 24, 2019	Haleakala	Pan-STARRS 1	EUN	810 m	MPC · JPL
791428	2019 UW_{92}	—	October 23, 2019	Mount Lemmon	Mount Lemmon Survey	·	2.1 km	MPC · JPL
791429	2019 UN_{94}	—	October 24, 2019	Mount Lemmon	Mount Lemmon Survey	·	2.2 km	MPC · JPL
791430	2019 UO_{96}	—	January 2, 2011	Mount Lemmon	Mount Lemmon Survey	KOR	960 m	MPC · JPL
791431	2019 US_{97}	—	October 24, 2019	Haleakala	Pan-STARRS 2	·	2.3 km	MPC · JPL
791432	2019 UR_{100}	—	October 21, 2019	Mount Lemmon	Mount Lemmon Survey	(194)	930 m	MPC · JPL
791433	2019 UJ_{101}	—	October 22, 2019	Mount Lemmon	Mount Lemmon Survey	MAR	610 m	MPC · JPL
791434	2019 UN_{101}	—	October 23, 2019	Haleakala	Pan-STARRS 1	·	1.9 km	MPC · JPL
791435	2019 UX_{101}	—	October 21, 2019	Mount Lemmon	Mount Lemmon Survey	HNS	840 m	MPC · JPL
791436	2019 UZ_{101}	—	October 23, 2019	Mount Lemmon	Mount Lemmon Survey	·	2.5 km	MPC · JPL
791437	2019 UO_{102}	—	October 25, 2019	Haleakala	Pan-STARRS 2	·	1.2 km	MPC · JPL
791438	2019 UE_{103}	—	October 27, 2019	Haleakala	Pan-STARRS 2	·	1.7 km	MPC · JPL
791439	2019 UV_{103}	—	October 24, 2019	Haleakala	Pan-STARRS 1	(5)	850 m	MPC · JPL
791440	2019 UZ_{104}	—	October 24, 2019	Haleakala	Pan-STARRS 1	·	730 m	MPC · JPL
791441	2019 US_{106}	—	October 23, 2019	Haleakala	Pan-STARRS 1	EUN	690 m	MPC · JPL
791442	2019 UN_{107}	—	October 23, 2019	Mount Lemmon	Mount Lemmon Survey	·	900 m	MPC · JPL
791443	2019 UX_{113}	—	January 20, 2012	Mount Lemmon	Mount Lemmon Survey	·	850 m	MPC · JPL
791444	2019 UK_{114}	—	October 24, 2019	Mount Lemmon	Mount Lemmon Survey	·	1.2 km	MPC · JPL
791445	2019 UX_{114}	—	October 28, 2019	Haleakala	Pan-STARRS 1	·	1.8 km	MPC · JPL
791446	2019 UN_{115}	—	October 22, 2019	Mount Lemmon	Mount Lemmon Survey	·	1 km	MPC · JPL
791447	2019 UG_{117}	—	March 27, 2009	Mauna Kea	P. A. Wiegert	·	1.1 km	MPC · JPL
791448	2019 UC_{119}	—	October 24, 2019	Haleakala	Pan-STARRS 1	·	1.8 km	MPC · JPL
791449	2019 UX_{120}	—	October 29, 2019	Mount Lemmon	Mount Lemmon Survey	·	1.3 km	MPC · JPL
791450	2019 UZ_{120}	—	October 24, 2019	Haleakala	Pan-STARRS 1	KOR	840 m	MPC · JPL
791451	2019 UB_{121}	—	October 24, 2019	Mount Lemmon	Mount Lemmon Survey	·	1.2 km	MPC · JPL
791452	2019 UE_{121}	—	October 25, 2019	Haleakala	Pan-STARRS 1	WIT	660 m	MPC · JPL
791453	2019 UX_{122}	—	October 24, 2019	Mount Lemmon	Mount Lemmon Survey	·	1.3 km	MPC · JPL
791454	2019 UX_{123}	—	October 30, 2019	Mount Lemmon	Mount Lemmon Survey	·	2.6 km	MPC · JPL
791455	2019 UP_{124}	—	October 28, 2019	Haleakala	Pan-STARRS 1	HNS	680 m	MPC · JPL
791456	2019 UM_{126}	—	October 22, 2019	Mount Lemmon	Mount Lemmon Survey	·	1.1 km	MPC · JPL
791457	2019 UB_{127}	—	January 10, 2013	Haleakala	Pan-STARRS 1	·	900 m	MPC · JPL
791458	2019 UD_{127}	—	March 23, 2001	Kitt Peak	SKADS	·	1.4 km	MPC · JPL
791459	2019 UK_{128}	—	October 20, 2019	Mount Lemmon	Mount Lemmon Survey	·	1.4 km	MPC · JPL
791460	2019 UQ_{130}	—	October 25, 2019	Haleakala	Pan-STARRS 1	·	2.3 km	MPC · JPL
791461	2019 UJ_{151}	—	October 31, 2019	Haleakala	Pan-STARRS 2	·	1.3 km	MPC · JPL
791462	2019 UH_{154}	—	October 26, 2019	Mount Lemmon	Mount Lemmon Survey	HOF	2.0 km	MPC · JPL
791463	2019 UE_{161}	—	October 23, 2019	Mount Lemmon	Mount Lemmon Survey	·	1.0 km	MPC · JPL
791464	2019 UV_{161}	—	October 22, 2019	Mount Lemmon	Mount Lemmon Survey	·	980 m	MPC · JPL
791465	2019 UK_{162}	—	October 28, 2019	Haleakala	Pan-STARRS 1	·	920 m	MPC · JPL
791466	2019 UL_{165}	—	October 27, 2019	Haleakala	Pan-STARRS 1	·	810 m	MPC · JPL
791467	2019 UA_{166}	—	October 24, 2019	Mount Lemmon	Mount Lemmon Survey	PAD	1.2 km	MPC · JPL
791468	2019 UH_{167}	—	December 3, 2015	Mount Lemmon	Mount Lemmon Survey	HOF	1.9 km	MPC · JPL
791469	2019 US_{193}	—	October 23, 2019	Mount Lemmon	Mount Lemmon Survey	·	1.7 km	MPC · JPL
791470	2019 UW_{195}	—	October 31, 2019	Haleakala	Pan-STARRS 1	·	1.5 km	MPC · JPL
791471	2019 UT_{196}	—	October 23, 2019	Mount Lemmon	Mount Lemmon Survey	·	1.4 km	MPC · JPL
791472	2019 VT_{6}	—	November 28, 2014	Kitt Peak	Spacewatch	·	1.3 km	MPC · JPL
791473	2019 VT_{7}	—	April 3, 2016	Haleakala	Pan-STARRS 1	·	1.8 km	MPC · JPL
791474	2019 VC_{8}	—	November 2, 2019	Haleakala	Pan-STARRS 2	·	1.8 km	MPC · JPL
791475	2019 VD_{8}	—	March 28, 2016	Cerro Tololo	DECam	·	2.1 km	MPC · JPL
791476	2019 VF_{8}	—	November 2, 2019	Haleakala	Pan-STARRS 2	·	1.5 km	MPC · JPL
791477	2019 VQ_{8}	—	November 2, 2019	Haleakala	Pan-STARRS 1	·	1.2 km	MPC · JPL
791478	2019 VD_{19}	—	November 2, 2019	Haleakala	Pan-STARRS 1	·	1.3 km	MPC · JPL
791479	2019 VO_{19}	—	November 2, 2019	Haleakala	Pan-STARRS 1	·	1.3 km	MPC · JPL
791480	2019 VG_{21}	—	October 8, 2008	Mount Lemmon	Mount Lemmon Survey	·	2.0 km	MPC · JPL
791481	2019 VK_{21}	—	November 22, 2006	Kitt Peak	Spacewatch	·	1.3 km	MPC · JPL
791482	2019 VO_{23}	—	November 4, 2019	Mount Lemmon	Mount Lemmon Survey	·	2.1 km	MPC · JPL
791483	2019 VF_{24}	—	April 2, 2016	Haleakala	Pan-STARRS 1	·	1.7 km	MPC · JPL
791484	2019 VD_{25}	—	November 5, 2019	Mount Lemmon	Mount Lemmon Survey	·	2.2 km	MPC · JPL
791485	2019 VQ_{25}	—	November 2, 2019	Haleakala	Pan-STARRS 1	·	1.0 km	MPC · JPL
791486	2019 VU_{25}	—	November 5, 2019	Mount Lemmon	Mount Lemmon Survey	·	800 m	MPC · JPL
791487	2019 VV_{25}	—	November 5, 2019	Mount Lemmon	Mount Lemmon Survey	·	1.2 km	MPC · JPL
791488	2019 VM_{28}	—	March 1, 2011	Mount Lemmon	Mount Lemmon Survey	·	2.0 km	MPC · JPL
791489	2019 VB_{29}	—	November 5, 2019	Mount Lemmon	Mount Lemmon Survey	NEM	1.4 km	MPC · JPL
791490	2019 VN_{29}	—	November 5, 2019	Mount Lemmon	Mount Lemmon Survey	JUN	680 m	MPC · JPL
791491	2019 VQ_{29}	—	December 29, 2014	Haleakala	Pan-STARRS 1	VER	1.8 km	MPC · JPL
791492	2019 VT_{29}	—	November 2, 2019	Haleakala	Pan-STARRS 1	·	1.0 km	MPC · JPL
791493	2019 VV_{29}	—	November 4, 2019	Haleakala	Pan-STARRS 1	NEM	1.6 km	MPC · JPL
791494	2019 VV_{30}	—	November 2, 2019	Haleakala	Pan-STARRS 1	·	860 m	MPC · JPL
791495	2019 VB_{31}	—	January 30, 2012	Kitt Peak	Spacewatch	·	1.2 km	MPC · JPL
791496	2019 VC_{31}	—	November 5, 2019	Mount Lemmon	Mount Lemmon Survey	·	890 m	MPC · JPL
791497	2019 VS_{31}	—	November 2, 2019	Haleakala	Pan-STARRS 1	·	1.3 km	MPC · JPL
791498	2019 VX_{32}	—	November 5, 2019	Mount Lemmon	Mount Lemmon Survey	·	1.1 km	MPC · JPL
791499	2019 VQ_{33}	—	November 3, 2019	Haleakala	Pan-STARRS 1	·	880 m	MPC · JPL
791500	2019 VW_{33}	—	November 5, 2019	Mount Lemmon	Mount Lemmon Survey	·	1 km	MPC · JPL

== 791501–791600 ==
back to top

Designation			Discovery			Properties		Ref
Permanent	Provisional	Named after	Date	Site	Discoverer(s)	Category	Diam.	Ref
791501	2019 VL_{34}	—	August 13, 2018	Haleakala	Pan-STARRS 1	KOR	980 m	MPC · JPL
791502	2019 VM_{34}	—	November 2, 2019	Haleakala	Pan-STARRS 1	·	1.3 km	MPC · JPL
791503	2019 VZ_{37}	—	November 5, 2019	Mount Lemmon	Mount Lemmon Survey	KOR	920 m	MPC · JPL
791504	2019 VA_{38}	—	November 5, 2019	Mount Lemmon	Mount Lemmon Survey	·	1.0 km	MPC · JPL
791505	2019 VB_{43}	—	November 2, 2019	Haleakala	Pan-STARRS 1	·	1.1 km	MPC · JPL
791506	2019 VP_{43}	—	December 19, 2015	Mount Lemmon	Mount Lemmon Survey	·	960 m	MPC · JPL
791507	2019 WJ_{1}	—	March 22, 2015	Haleakala	Pan-STARRS 1	L4	7.2 km	MPC · JPL
791508	2019 WR_{7}	—	November 27, 2019	Haleakala	Pan-STARRS 1	·	1.7 km	MPC · JPL
791509	2019 WX_{7}	—	November 27, 2019	Haleakala	Pan-STARRS 2	·	1.6 km	MPC · JPL
791510	2019 WG_{8}	—	November 29, 2019	Haleakala	Pan-STARRS 1	·	2.1 km	MPC · JPL
791511	2019 WJ_{10}	—	November 29, 2019	Haleakala	Pan-STARRS 1	·	2.7 km	MPC · JPL
791512	2019 WN_{11}	—	November 19, 2019	Mount Lemmon	Mount Lemmon Survey	·	1.8 km	MPC · JPL
791513	2019 WV_{11}	—	November 26, 2019	Haleakala	Pan-STARRS 1	HNS	760 m	MPC · JPL
791514	2019 WD_{13}	—	November 14, 2010	Mount Lemmon	Mount Lemmon Survey	·	1.3 km	MPC · JPL
791515	2019 WU_{13}	—	October 3, 2013	Kitt Peak	Spacewatch	·	2.4 km	MPC · JPL
791516	2019 WG_{16}	—	November 19, 2019	Mount Lemmon	Mount Lemmon Survey	·	1.2 km	MPC · JPL
791517	2019 WF_{18}	—	November 28, 2019	Haleakala	Pan-STARRS 2	·	1.9 km	MPC · JPL
791518	2019 WO_{18}	—	November 26, 2019	Haleakala	Pan-STARRS 1	·	1.1 km	MPC · JPL
791519	2019 WQ_{18}	—	November 24, 2019	Mount Lemmon	Mount Lemmon Survey	(5)	910 m	MPC · JPL
791520	2019 WD_{19}	—	February 6, 2016	Mount Lemmon	Mount Lemmon Survey	·	1.2 km	MPC · JPL
791521	2019 WW_{20}	—	March 29, 2016	Cerro Tololo-DECam	DECam	EOS	1.3 km	MPC · JPL
791522	2019 WP_{21}	—	May 17, 2010	WISE	WISE	LUT	3.7 km	MPC · JPL
791523	2019 WA_{22}	—	November 26, 2019	Haleakala	Pan-STARRS 1	·	1.5 km	MPC · JPL
791524	2019 WN_{22}	—	November 19, 2019	Mount Lemmon	Mount Lemmon Survey	·	2.5 km	MPC · JPL
791525	2019 WK_{23}	—	September 3, 2013	Haleakala	Pan-STARRS 1	·	1.3 km	MPC · JPL
791526	2019 WF_{30}	—	November 26, 2019	Haleakala	Pan-STARRS 1	·	940 m	MPC · JPL
791527	2019 WB_{40}	—	November 19, 2019	Mount Lemmon	Mount Lemmon Survey	·	2.5 km	MPC · JPL
791528	2019 XN_{4}	—	December 3, 2019	Haleakala	Pan-STARRS 1	·	2.2 km	MPC · JPL
791529	2019 XO_{4}	—	December 3, 2019	Haleakala	Pan-STARRS 1	·	2.4 km	MPC · JPL
791530	2019 XT_{4}	—	December 7, 2019	Mount Lemmon	Mount Lemmon Survey	·	2.8 km	MPC · JPL
791531	2019 XE_{5}	—	December 4, 2019	Haleakala	Pan-STARRS 1	·	1.3 km	MPC · JPL
791532	2019 XF_{5}	—	December 9, 2019	Haleakala	Pan-STARRS 2	·	1.8 km	MPC · JPL
791533	2019 XR_{9}	—	December 6, 2019	Mount Lemmon	Mount Lemmon Survey	·	1.7 km	MPC · JPL
791534	2019 XK_{10}	—	December 6, 2019	Mount Lemmon	Mount Lemmon Survey	·	2.4 km	MPC · JPL
791535	2019 XW_{10}	—	December 3, 2019	Mount Lemmon	Mount Lemmon Survey	·	1.3 km	MPC · JPL
791536	2019 XU_{11}	—	April 26, 2010	WISE	WISE	·	1.4 km	MPC · JPL
791537	2019 XJ_{12}	—	November 22, 2014	Haleakala	Pan-STARRS 1	·	1.3 km	MPC · JPL
791538	2019 XA_{13}	—	December 6, 2019	Mount Lemmon	Mount Lemmon Survey	·	1.5 km	MPC · JPL
791539	2019 XQ_{13}	—	May 1, 2016	Cerro Tololo	DECam	·	1.6 km	MPC · JPL
791540	2019 XR_{13}	—	December 6, 2019	Mount Lemmon	Mount Lemmon Survey	·	2.2 km	MPC · JPL
791541	2019 XV_{13}	—	December 3, 2019	Haleakala	Pan-STARRS 1	LIX	2.5 km	MPC · JPL
791542	2019 XH_{14}	—	December 6, 2019	Mount Lemmon	Mount Lemmon Survey	·	1.4 km	MPC · JPL
791543	2019 XC_{15}	—	November 30, 2008	Kitt Peak	Spacewatch	·	2.2 km	MPC · JPL
791544	2019 XF_{15}	—	August 5, 2018	Haleakala	Pan-STARRS 1	·	1.2 km	MPC · JPL
791545	2019 XE_{17}	—	December 6, 2019	Mount Lemmon	Mount Lemmon Survey	·	1.8 km	MPC · JPL
791546	2019 XY_{17}	—	December 2, 2019	Mount Lemmon	Mount Lemmon Survey	·	1.6 km	MPC · JPL
791547	2019 XZ_{18}	—	December 2, 2019	Mount Lemmon	Mount Lemmon Survey	·	1.2 km	MPC · JPL
791548	2019 XM_{19}	—	December 2, 2019	Mount Lemmon	Mount Lemmon Survey	·	1.0 km	MPC · JPL
791549	2019 XZ_{20}	—	August 15, 2013	Haleakala	Pan-STARRS 1	·	1.7 km	MPC · JPL
791550	2019 YY_{7}	—	December 28, 2019	Haleakala	Pan-STARRS 1	EOS	1.3 km	MPC · JPL
791551	2019 YC_{8}	—	December 30, 2019	Haleakala	Pan-STARRS 1	·	1.2 km	MPC · JPL
791552	2019 YF_{8}	—	March 6, 2016	Haleakala	Pan-STARRS 1	·	1.4 km	MPC · JPL
791553	2019 YL_{8}	—	December 28, 2019	Haleakala	Pan-STARRS 1	EOS	1.4 km	MPC · JPL
791554	2019 YW_{8}	—	December 28, 2019	Haleakala	Pan-STARRS 1	·	1.2 km	MPC · JPL
791555	2019 YN_{10}	—	December 24, 2019	Haleakala	Pan-STARRS 2	·	2.7 km	MPC · JPL
791556	2019 YQ_{10}	—	December 28, 2019	Haleakala	Pan-STARRS 1	TEL	1 km	MPC · JPL
791557	2019 YU_{10}	—	December 24, 2019	Haleakala	Pan-STARRS 1	·	1.7 km	MPC · JPL
791558	2019 YW_{10}	—	December 28, 2019	Haleakala	Pan-STARRS 1	·	1.9 km	MPC · JPL
791559	2019 YX_{10}	—	December 28, 2019	Haleakala	Pan-STARRS 1	·	1.7 km	MPC · JPL
791560	2019 YA_{13}	—	November 6, 2013	Haleakala	Pan-STARRS 1	·	1.7 km	MPC · JPL
791561	2019 YQ_{14}	—	December 28, 2019	Haleakala	Pan-STARRS 1	·	2.1 km	MPC · JPL
791562	2019 YW_{16}	—	March 29, 2016	Cerro Tololo-DECam	DECam	HOF	1.6 km	MPC · JPL
791563	2019 YA_{19}	—	December 30, 2019	Kitt Peak	Bok NEO Survey	·	1.1 km	MPC · JPL
791564	2019 YE_{19}	—	December 30, 2019	Kitt Peak	Bok NEO Survey	·	1.2 km	MPC · JPL
791565	2019 YX_{20}	—	November 26, 2014	Haleakala	Pan-STARRS 1	·	1.3 km	MPC · JPL
791566	2019 YV_{22}	—	December 30, 2019	Haleakala	Pan-STARRS 1	GEF	650 m	MPC · JPL
791567	2019 YB_{27}	—	December 20, 2019	Mount Lemmon	Mount Lemmon Survey	·	1.3 km	MPC · JPL
791568	2019 YF_{28}	—	December 22, 2008	Kitt Peak	Spacewatch	·	2.3 km	MPC · JPL
791569	2019 YM_{35}	—	December 28, 2019	Haleakala	Pan-STARRS 1	·	1.7 km	MPC · JPL
791570	2019 YV_{36}	—	December 30, 2019	Kitt Peak	Bok NEO Survey	·	1.4 km	MPC · JPL
791571	2019 YW_{36}	—	December 30, 2019	Haleakala	Pan-STARRS 1	·	2.1 km	MPC · JPL
791572	2019 YG_{37}	—	December 31, 2019	Haleakala	Pan-STARRS 1	·	940 m	MPC · JPL
791573	2019 YP_{37}	—	January 18, 2015	Mount Lemmon	Mount Lemmon Survey	·	1.5 km	MPC · JPL
791574	2019 YT_{37}	—	March 16, 2015	Mount Lemmon	Mount Lemmon Survey	·	1.3 km	MPC · JPL
791575	2019 YU_{37}	—	December 30, 2019	Kitt Peak	Bok NEO Survey	·	1.4 km	MPC · JPL
791576	2019 YZ_{38}	—	December 20, 2019	Mount Lemmon	Mount Lemmon Survey	HOF	1.8 km	MPC · JPL
791577	2019 YE_{39}	—	December 19, 2019	Mount Lemmon	Mount Lemmon Survey	·	1.3 km	MPC · JPL
791578	2019 YE_{41}	—	December 24, 2019	Haleakala	Pan-STARRS 1	·	1.0 km	MPC · JPL
791579	2019 YM_{41}	—	November 3, 2018	Mount Lemmon	Mount Lemmon Survey	·	1.8 km	MPC · JPL
791580	2019 YW_{42}	—	December 24, 2019	Haleakala	Pan-STARRS 1	·	1.8 km	MPC · JPL
791581	2019 YZ_{42}	—	December 30, 2019	Kitt Peak	Bok NEO Survey	·	1.4 km	MPC · JPL
791582	2019 YY_{48}	—	December 28, 2019	Haleakala	Pan-STARRS 1	·	1.3 km	MPC · JPL
791583	2019 YT_{50}	—	January 21, 2015	Haleakala	Pan-STARRS 1	·	1.7 km	MPC · JPL
791584	2019 YL_{51}	—	December 20, 2019	Mount Lemmon	Mount Lemmon Survey	·	890 m	MPC · JPL
791585	2019 YK_{54}	—	January 25, 2015	Haleakala	Pan-STARRS 1	·	1.9 km	MPC · JPL
791586	2019 YO_{56}	—	January 26, 2015	Haleakala	Pan-STARRS 1	·	1.3 km	MPC · JPL
791587	2020 AD_{3}	—	January 7, 2020	Catalina	CSS	ATE · PHA	170 m	MPC · JPL
791588	2020 AK_{4}	—	January 2, 2020	Haleakala	Pan-STARRS 1	·	1.2 km	MPC · JPL
791589	2020 AQ_{4}	—	January 1, 2020	Haleakala	Pan-STARRS 1	·	1.6 km	MPC · JPL
791590	2020 AR_{4}	—	January 1, 2020	Haleakala	Pan-STARRS 1	·	1.4 km	MPC · JPL
791591	2020 AD_{5}	—	July 13, 2015	Haleakala	Pan-STARRS 1	·	2.8 km	MPC · JPL
791592	2020 AH_{5}	—	January 2, 2020	Haleakala	Pan-STARRS 1	·	1.8 km	MPC · JPL
791593	2020 AW_{5}	—	January 6, 2020	Mount Lemmon	Mount Lemmon Survey	·	2.2 km	MPC · JPL
791594	2020 AC_{6}	—	April 17, 2015	Cerro Tololo	DECam	VER	2.1 km	MPC · JPL
791595	2020 AD_{6}	—	August 13, 2012	Haleakala	Pan-STARRS 1	·	1.5 km	MPC · JPL
791596	2020 AH_{6}	—	January 1, 2020	Haleakala	Pan-STARRS 1	·	1.5 km	MPC · JPL
791597	2020 AV_{10}	—	April 14, 2016	Haleakala	Pan-STARRS 1	·	1.6 km	MPC · JPL
791598	2020 AB_{11}	—	April 25, 2015	Haleakala	Pan-STARRS 1	·	2.0 km	MPC · JPL
791599	2020 AK_{21}	—	January 3, 2020	Mount Lemmon	Mount Lemmon Survey	·	1.6 km	MPC · JPL
791600	2020 AC_{22}	—	January 1, 2020	Haleakala	Pan-STARRS 1	AGN	770 m	MPC · JPL

== 791601–791700 ==
back to top

Designation			Discovery			Properties		Ref
Permanent	Provisional	Named after	Date	Site	Discoverer(s)	Category	Diam.	Ref
791601	2020 AX_{26}	—	January 1, 2020	Haleakala	Pan-STARRS 1	·	1.3 km	MPC · JPL
791602	2020 AO_{27}	—	January 3, 2020	Mount Lemmon	Mount Lemmon Survey	·	1.3 km	MPC · JPL
791603	2020 BE_{17}	—	March 21, 2015	Haleakala	Pan-STARRS 1	·	1.7 km	MPC · JPL
791604	2020 BN_{17}	—	November 1, 2018	Haleakala	Pan-STARRS 2	DOR	1.8 km	MPC · JPL
791605	2020 BP_{17}	—	January 24, 2020	Mount Lemmon	Mount Lemmon Survey	·	3.0 km	MPC · JPL
791606	2020 BQ_{17}	—	January 23, 2020	Haleakala	Pan-STARRS 1	·	1.3 km	MPC · JPL
791607	2020 BS_{17}	—	April 14, 2016	Mount Lemmon	Mount Lemmon Survey	·	1.3 km	MPC · JPL
791608	2020 BU_{17}	—	May 1, 2016	Haleakala	Pan-STARRS 1	KOR	930 m	MPC · JPL
791609	2020 BC_{18}	—	January 23, 2020	Haleakala	Pan-STARRS 1	·	1.8 km	MPC · JPL
791610	2020 BF_{18}	—	January 24, 2020	Mount Lemmon	Mount Lemmon Survey	KOR	960 m	MPC · JPL
791611	2020 BK_{18}	—	January 20, 2020	Haleakala	Pan-STARRS 1	·	1.3 km	MPC · JPL
791612	2020 BR_{18}	—	January 23, 2020	Haleakala	Pan-STARRS 1	·	1.3 km	MPC · JPL
791613	2020 BW_{18}	—	January 25, 2020	Haleakala	Pan-STARRS 1	EOS	1.3 km	MPC · JPL
791614	2020 BP_{19}	—	January 21, 2020	Haleakala	Pan-STARRS 1	·	1.3 km	MPC · JPL
791615	2020 BY_{19}	—	January 23, 2020	Haleakala	Pan-STARRS 2	·	1.7 km	MPC · JPL
791616	2020 BW_{20}	—	January 23, 2020	Haleakala	Pan-STARRS 1	·	860 m	MPC · JPL
791617	2020 BH_{21}	—	January 25, 2020	Mount Lemmon	Mount Lemmon Survey	·	2.2 km	MPC · JPL
791618	2020 BL_{21}	—	January 25, 2020	Haleakala	Pan-STARRS 1	·	2.2 km	MPC · JPL
791619	2020 BN_{21}	—	May 18, 2015	Haleakala	Pan-STARRS 1	·	2.3 km	MPC · JPL
791620	2020 BQ_{21}	—	January 30, 2020	Haleakala	Pan-STARRS 1	·	1.6 km	MPC · JPL
791621	2020 BS_{21}	—	January 23, 2020	Haleakala	Pan-STARRS 2	·	2.4 km	MPC · JPL
791622	2020 BY_{21}	—	January 23, 2020	Haleakala	Pan-STARRS 1	·	2.3 km	MPC · JPL
791623	2020 BN_{23}	—	March 28, 2015	Haleakala	Pan-STARRS 1	·	2.0 km	MPC · JPL
791624	2020 BY_{28}	—	November 15, 2007	Mount Lemmon	Mount Lemmon Survey	·	2.2 km	MPC · JPL
791625	2020 BG_{30}	—	December 31, 2008	Kitt Peak	Spacewatch	·	1.8 km	MPC · JPL
791626	2020 BS_{30}	—	January 21, 2020	Haleakala	Pan-STARRS 2	·	1.2 km	MPC · JPL
791627	2020 BZ_{30}	—	October 10, 2018	Mount Lemmon	Mount Lemmon Survey	EOS	1.2 km	MPC · JPL
791628	2020 BH_{32}	—	February 15, 2016	Haleakala	Pan-STARRS 1	·	1.4 km	MPC · JPL
791629	2020 BL_{35}	—	February 24, 2015	Haleakala	Pan-STARRS 1	·	2.2 km	MPC · JPL
791630	2020 BF_{38}	—	January 23, 2020	Haleakala	Pan-STARRS 1	·	1.3 km	MPC · JPL
791631	2020 BS_{41}	—	January 20, 2015	Haleakala	Pan-STARRS 1	·	1.3 km	MPC · JPL
791632	2020 BT_{43}	—	January 22, 2015	Haleakala	Pan-STARRS 1	EOS	1.3 km	MPC · JPL
791633	2020 BX_{45}	—	January 17, 2015	Mount Lemmon	Mount Lemmon Survey	·	1.3 km	MPC · JPL
791634	2020 BG_{46}	—	March 25, 2015	Haleakala	Pan-STARRS 1	·	2.2 km	MPC · JPL
791635	2020 BR_{46}	—	January 21, 2020	Haleakala	Pan-STARRS 2	·	1.5 km	MPC · JPL
791636	2020 BU_{47}	—	January 23, 2020	Mount Lemmon	Mount Lemmon Survey	GEF	950 m	MPC · JPL
791637	2020 BM_{49}	—	January 18, 2020	Haleakala	Pan-STARRS 1	·	2.0 km	MPC · JPL
791638	2020 BN_{55}	—	January 21, 2020	Haleakala	Pan-STARRS 1	·	1.1 km	MPC · JPL
791639	2020 BY_{56}	—	November 2, 2018	Haleakala	Pan-STARRS 2	·	1.3 km	MPC · JPL
791640	2020 BD_{57}	—	September 19, 2018	Haleakala	Pan-STARRS 2	·	1.4 km	MPC · JPL
791641	2020 BF_{57}	—	January 10, 2006	Mount Lemmon	Mount Lemmon Survey	·	1.3 km	MPC · JPL
791642	2020 BL_{61}	—	January 23, 2020	Haleakala	Pan-STARRS 1	EOS	1.2 km	MPC · JPL
791643	2020 BN_{61}	—	January 23, 2020	Haleakala	Pan-STARRS 1	·	1.3 km	MPC · JPL
791644	2020 BP_{61}	—	January 23, 2020	Haleakala	Pan-STARRS 1	EOS	1.3 km	MPC · JPL
791645	2020 BQ_{62}	—	January 27, 2020	Haleakala	Pan-STARRS 1	·	2.1 km	MPC · JPL
791646	2020 BA_{63}	—	January 23, 2020	Haleakala	Pan-STARRS 1	EOS	1.4 km	MPC · JPL
791647	2020 BM_{63}	—	January 29, 2020	Haleakala	Pan-STARRS 2	EOS	1.3 km	MPC · JPL
791648	2020 BS_{63}	—	March 20, 1999	Apache Point	SDSS	·	1.6 km	MPC · JPL
791649	2020 BS_{65}	—	January 25, 2020	Haleakala	Pan-STARRS 2	BRA	980 m	MPC · JPL
791650	2020 BL_{66}	—	August 27, 2009	Kitt Peak	Spacewatch	·	1.2 km	MPC · JPL
791651	2020 BO_{67}	—	April 28, 2017	Haleakala	Pan-STARRS 1	·	1.0 km	MPC · JPL
791652	2020 BW_{67}	—	January 21, 2020	Haleakala	Pan-STARRS 1	·	1.3 km	MPC · JPL
791653	2020 BJ_{68}	—	January 19, 2020	Haleakala	Pan-STARRS 1	·	1.6 km	MPC · JPL
791654	2020 BB_{69}	—	January 24, 2011	Mount Lemmon	Mount Lemmon Survey	·	1.5 km	MPC · JPL
791655	2020 BF_{69}	—	October 25, 2013	Haleakala	Pan-STARRS 1	·	1.4 km	MPC · JPL
791656	2020 BO_{70}	—	November 25, 2009	Kitt Peak	Spacewatch	HOF	1.9 km	MPC · JPL
791657	2020 BT_{71}	—	October 4, 2018	Haleakala	Pan-STARRS 2	·	1.5 km	MPC · JPL
791658	2020 BY_{71}	—	January 18, 2020	Mount Lemmon	Mount Lemmon Survey	·	1.6 km	MPC · JPL
791659	2020 BC_{72}	—	January 23, 2020	Haleakala	Pan-STARRS 1	·	1.4 km	MPC · JPL
791660	2020 BJ_{72}	—	October 15, 2018	Haleakala	Pan-STARRS 2	·	1.3 km	MPC · JPL
791661	2020 BB_{73}	—	August 1, 2017	Haleakala	Pan-STARRS 1	·	2.6 km	MPC · JPL
791662	2020 BC_{73}	—	January 21, 2020	Haleakala	Pan-STARRS 1	EOS	1.2 km	MPC · JPL
791663	2020 BN_{74}	—	October 16, 2018	Haleakala	Pan-STARRS 2	·	1.6 km	MPC · JPL
791664	2020 BD_{75}	—	February 7, 2015	Mount Lemmon	Mount Lemmon Survey	·	1.2 km	MPC · JPL
791665	2020 BJ_{76}	—	January 19, 2020	Mount Lemmon	Mount Lemmon Survey	·	2.8 km	MPC · JPL
791666	2020 BT_{76}	—	January 20, 2020	Haleakala	Pan-STARRS 1	HOF	1.8 km	MPC · JPL
791667	2020 BU_{76}	—	January 21, 2020	Haleakala	Pan-STARRS 2	·	1.3 km	MPC · JPL
791668	2020 BZ_{76}	—	January 23, 2020	Haleakala	Pan-STARRS 1	·	2.4 km	MPC · JPL
791669	2020 BB_{77}	—	January 23, 2020	Mount Lemmon	Mount Lemmon Survey	·	2.0 km	MPC · JPL
791670	2020 BG_{77}	—	January 24, 2020	Mount Lemmon	Mount Lemmon Survey	AGN	880 m	MPC · JPL
791671	2020 BV_{77}	—	January 19, 2020	Haleakala	Pan-STARRS 1	·	2.3 km	MPC · JPL
791672	2020 BX_{77}	—	January 23, 2020	Haleakala	Pan-STARRS 1	EOS	1.4 km	MPC · JPL
791673	2020 BD_{78}	—	January 26, 2020	Haleakala	Pan-STARRS 1	EOS	1.3 km	MPC · JPL
791674	2020 BL_{78}	—	January 23, 2020	Haleakala	Pan-STARRS 1	·	1.8 km	MPC · JPL
791675	2020 BG_{79}	—	November 10, 2013	Mount Lemmon	Mount Lemmon Survey	·	1.3 km	MPC · JPL
791676	2020 BZ_{79}	—	April 13, 2016	Mount Lemmon	Mount Lemmon Survey	KOR	1.0 km	MPC · JPL
791677	2020 BB_{80}	—	January 22, 2015	Haleakala	Pan-STARRS 1	KOR	990 m	MPC · JPL
791678	2020 BD_{80}	—	January 26, 2020	Haleakala	Pan-STARRS 1	·	1.3 km	MPC · JPL
791679	2020 BW_{80}	—	August 4, 2013	Haleakala	Pan-STARRS 1	·	1.0 km	MPC · JPL
791680	2020 BE_{81}	—	January 24, 2020	Mount Lemmon	Mount Lemmon Survey	·	1.3 km	MPC · JPL
791681	2020 BH_{81}	—	January 19, 2020	Haleakala	Pan-STARRS 1	·	1.2 km	MPC · JPL
791682	2020 BQ_{81}	—	January 24, 2020	Haleakala	Pan-STARRS 2	GAL	1.1 km	MPC · JPL
791683	2020 BT_{81}	—	January 25, 2020	Mount Lemmon	Mount Lemmon Survey	·	2.1 km	MPC · JPL
791684	2020 BX_{81}	—	January 24, 2020	Haleakala	Pan-STARRS 1	KOR	980 m	MPC · JPL
791685	2020 BH_{82}	—	February 16, 2015	Haleakala	Pan-STARRS 1	·	1.7 km	MPC · JPL
791686	2020 BZ_{82}	—	January 28, 2015	Haleakala	Pan-STARRS 1	·	2.1 km	MPC · JPL
791687	2020 BD_{83}	—	January 25, 2020	Mount Lemmon	Mount Lemmon Survey	·	2.2 km	MPC · JPL
791688	2020 BV_{83}	—	January 21, 2020	Haleakala	Pan-STARRS 2	·	1.3 km	MPC · JPL
791689	2020 BM_{84}	—	January 18, 2020	Mount Lemmon	Mount Lemmon Survey	·	2.2 km	MPC · JPL
791690	2020 BX_{84}	—	January 21, 2020	Haleakala	Pan-STARRS 1	·	1.2 km	MPC · JPL
791691	2020 BD_{85}	—	January 19, 2020	Haleakala	Pan-STARRS 1	·	2.0 km	MPC · JPL
791692	2020 BP_{87}	—	January 21, 2020	Haleakala	Pan-STARRS 1	·	1.9 km	MPC · JPL
791693	2020 BX_{87}	—	February 8, 2011	Mount Lemmon	Mount Lemmon Survey	·	1.2 km	MPC · JPL
791694	2020 BS_{89}	—	January 23, 2020	Haleakala	Pan-STARRS 1	·	1.7 km	MPC · JPL
791695	2020 BM_{92}	—	April 17, 2015	Cerro Tololo	DECam	·	2.2 km	MPC · JPL
791696	2020 BK_{93}	—	January 24, 2020	Mount Lemmon	Mount Lemmon Survey	·	2.6 km	MPC · JPL
791697	2020 BW_{93}	—	January 23, 2020	Haleakala	Pan-STARRS 1	URS	2.2 km	MPC · JPL
791698	2020 BT_{94}	—	January 24, 2020	Haleakala	Pan-STARRS 1	·	2.2 km	MPC · JPL
791699	2020 BU_{94}	—	January 16, 2015	Haleakala	Pan-STARRS 1	AGN	840 m	MPC · JPL
791700	2020 BH_{95}	—	April 5, 2016	Haleakala	Pan-STARRS 1	·	1.2 km	MPC · JPL

== 791701–791800 ==
back to top

Designation			Discovery			Properties		Ref
Permanent	Provisional	Named after	Date	Site	Discoverer(s)	Category	Diam.	Ref
791701	2020 BK_{95}	—	January 21, 2020	Haleakala	Pan-STARRS 1	·	1.7 km	MPC · JPL
791702	2020 BP_{96}	—	January 20, 2020	Haleakala	Pan-STARRS 2	·	1.3 km	MPC · JPL
791703	2020 BJ_{98}	—	January 27, 2015	Haleakala	Pan-STARRS 1	·	1.6 km	MPC · JPL
791704	2020 BO_{98}	—	January 19, 2020	Haleakala	Pan-STARRS 1	·	1 km	MPC · JPL
791705	2020 BW_{98}	—	January 23, 2020	Haleakala	Pan-STARRS 1	·	1.4 km	MPC · JPL
791706	2020 BL_{99}	—	January 26, 2020	Mount Lemmon	Mount Lemmon Survey	·	1.7 km	MPC · JPL
791707	2020 BN_{99}	—	January 23, 2020	Haleakala	Pan-STARRS 1	·	1.9 km	MPC · JPL
791708	2020 BU_{100}	—	January 25, 2020	Mount Lemmon	Mount Lemmon Survey	·	1.4 km	MPC · JPL
791709	2020 BZ_{101}	—	January 25, 2020	Haleakala	Pan-STARRS 1	·	1.7 km	MPC · JPL
791710	2020 BH_{104}	—	January 21, 2020	Haleakala	Pan-STARRS 2	·	1.1 km	MPC · JPL
791711	2020 BN_{104}	—	February 5, 2011	Haleakala	Pan-STARRS 1	·	1.1 km	MPC · JPL
791712	2020 BV_{107}	—	January 19, 2020	Haleakala	Pan-STARRS 1	EOS	1.0 km	MPC · JPL
791713	2020 BR_{111}	—	February 10, 2015	Mount Lemmon	Mount Lemmon Survey	·	1.1 km	MPC · JPL
791714	2020 BU_{114}	—	April 14, 2016	Mount Lemmon	Mount Lemmon Survey	·	1.4 km	MPC · JPL
791715	2020 BA_{117}	—	December 29, 2014	Haleakala	Pan-STARRS 1	·	1.2 km	MPC · JPL
791716	2020 BJ_{117}	—	October 20, 2018	Mount Lemmon	Mount Lemmon Survey	·	1.3 km	MPC · JPL
791717	2020 BD_{118}	—	August 9, 2013	Kitt Peak	Spacewatch	·	1.2 km	MPC · JPL
791718	2020 BM_{118}	—	January 21, 2020	Haleakala	Pan-STARRS 1	·	1.4 km	MPC · JPL
791719	2020 BR_{118}	—	January 23, 2020	Haleakala	Pan-STARRS 1	·	1.3 km	MPC · JPL
791720	2020 BX_{118}	—	January 21, 2020	Haleakala	Pan-STARRS 2	·	1.3 km	MPC · JPL
791721	2020 BZ_{118}	—	October 24, 2009	Kitt Peak	Spacewatch	AGN	800 m	MPC · JPL
791722	2020 BO_{120}	—	January 27, 2020	Haleakala	Pan-STARRS 1	·	1.6 km	MPC · JPL
791723	2020 BE_{125}	—	November 19, 2008	Kitt Peak	Spacewatch	EOS	1.1 km	MPC · JPL
791724	2020 BG_{125}	—	August 25, 2016	Kitt Peak	Spacewatch	·	2.7 km	MPC · JPL
791725	2020 BB_{128}	—	January 22, 2015	Haleakala	Pan-STARRS 1	EOS	1.2 km	MPC · JPL
791726	2020 BN_{134}	—	January 30, 2020	Haleakala	Pan-STARRS 1	·	2.5 km	MPC · JPL
791727	2020 BX_{135}	—	December 21, 2008	Kitt Peak	Spacewatch	·	1.6 km	MPC · JPL
791728	2020 BB_{136}	—	January 26, 2020	Haleakala	Pan-STARRS 1	·	2.3 km	MPC · JPL
791729	2020 BN_{136}	—	January 23, 2020	Mount Lemmon	Mount Lemmon Survey	·	2.5 km	MPC · JPL
791730	2020 BP_{136}	—	January 21, 2020	Haleakala	Pan-STARRS 1	·	2.1 km	MPC · JPL
791731	2020 BR_{136}	—	January 21, 2015	Haleakala	Pan-STARRS 1	·	2.0 km	MPC · JPL
791732	2020 BO_{138}	—	November 1, 2018	Mount Lemmon	Mount Lemmon Survey	·	1.3 km	MPC · JPL
791733	2020 BN_{139}	—	January 23, 2020	Haleakala	Pan-STARRS 1	VER	1.7 km	MPC · JPL
791734	2020 BE_{140}	—	January 21, 2020	Haleakala	Pan-STARRS 1	·	2.2 km	MPC · JPL
791735	2020 BZ_{140}	—	January 23, 2020	Mount Lemmon	Mount Lemmon Survey	·	1.2 km	MPC · JPL
791736	2020 BN_{143}	—	January 25, 2020	Haleakala	Pan-STARRS 1	EOS	1.2 km	MPC · JPL
791737	2020 BO_{143}	—	January 23, 2020	Haleakala	Pan-STARRS 1	·	1.1 km	MPC · JPL
791738	2020 BF_{145}	—	January 25, 2020	Mount Lemmon	Mount Lemmon Survey	·	1.4 km	MPC · JPL
791739	2020 BL_{147}	—	October 3, 2018	Haleakala	Pan-STARRS 2	·	1.1 km	MPC · JPL
791740	2020 BL_{165}	—	January 23, 2020	Haleakala	Pan-STARRS 1	·	1.6 km	MPC · JPL
791741	2020 BK_{171}	—	January 25, 2020	Haleakala	Pan-STARRS 1	·	2.4 km	MPC · JPL
791742	2020 CN_{7}	—	February 15, 2020	Mount Lemmon	Mount Lemmon Survey	EOS	1.3 km	MPC · JPL
791743	2020 CY_{7}	—	February 2, 2020	Mount Lemmon	Mount Lemmon Survey	·	2.1 km	MPC · JPL
791744	2020 CG_{9}	—	February 15, 2020	Mount Lemmon	Mount Lemmon Survey	TEL	900 m	MPC · JPL
791745	2020 CM_{9}	—	November 20, 2014	Mount Lemmon	Mount Lemmon Survey	·	1.3 km	MPC · JPL
791746	2020 DM_{5}	—	February 20, 2020	Kitt Peak	Bok NEO Survey	·	1.4 km	MPC · JPL
791747	2020 DO_{5}	—	February 20, 2020	Mount Lemmon	Mount Lemmon Survey	THB	2.5 km	MPC · JPL
791748	2020 DB_{6}	—	February 17, 2020	Mount Lemmon	Mount Lemmon Survey	·	2.0 km	MPC · JPL
791749	2020 DX_{7}	—	April 2, 2006	Kitt Peak	Spacewatch	·	1.4 km	MPC · JPL
791750	2020 DG_{8}	—	February 16, 2020	Mount Lemmon	Mount Lemmon Survey	THM	1.6 km	MPC · JPL
791751	2020 DT_{9}	—	February 27, 2020	Mount Lemmon	Mount Lemmon Survey	EOS	1.3 km	MPC · JPL
791752	2020 DP_{10}	—	September 14, 2017	Haleakala	Pan-STARRS 1	·	1.4 km	MPC · JPL
791753	2020 DV_{10}	—	February 27, 2020	Mount Lemmon	Mount Lemmon Survey	·	1.8 km	MPC · JPL
791754	2020 DA_{11}	—	February 29, 2020	Kitt Peak	Bok NEO Survey	EOS	1.5 km	MPC · JPL
791755	2020 DB_{11}	—	February 16, 2020	Mount Lemmon	Mount Lemmon Survey	·	1.3 km	MPC · JPL
791756	2020 DQ_{13}	—	February 16, 2020	Mount Lemmon	Mount Lemmon Survey	·	1.8 km	MPC · JPL
791757	2020 DE_{14}	—	May 20, 2015	Cerro Tololo	DECam	·	2.1 km	MPC · JPL
791758	2020 DZ_{14}	—	February 17, 2020	Mount Lemmon	Mount Lemmon Survey	·	2.0 km	MPC · JPL
791759	2020 DS_{16}	—	February 29, 2020	Kitt Peak	Bok NEO Survey	·	2.2 km	MPC · JPL
791760	2020 DU_{16}	—	October 1, 2017	Mount Lemmon	Mount Lemmon Survey	·	2.5 km	MPC · JPL
791761	2020 DU_{18}	—	February 27, 2020	Mount Lemmon	Mount Lemmon Survey	VER	1.9 km	MPC · JPL
791762	2020 DY_{18}	—	February 27, 2020	Mount Lemmon	Mount Lemmon Survey	EOS	1.2 km	MPC · JPL
791763	2020 DA_{19}	—	February 28, 2020	Kitt Peak	Bok NEO Survey	·	1.2 km	MPC · JPL
791764	2020 DC_{19}	—	February 16, 2020	Mount Lemmon	Mount Lemmon Survey	·	1.2 km	MPC · JPL
791765	2020 EJ_{1}	—	April 28, 2003	Anderson Mesa	LONEOS	·	2.9 km	MPC · JPL
791766	2020 EN_{2}	—	March 5, 2020	Mount Lemmon	Mount Lemmon Survey	MAR	730 m	MPC · JPL
791767	2020 EL_{3}	—	March 2, 2020	Cerro Tololo-DECam	DECam	·	2.2 km	MPC · JPL
791768	2020 EY_{3}	—	March 5, 2020	Mount Lemmon	Mount Lemmon Survey	·	1.6 km	MPC · JPL
791769	2020 EG_{4}	—	March 5, 2020	Mount Lemmon	Mount Lemmon Survey	·	1.8 km	MPC · JPL
791770	2020 EJ_{4}	—	March 5, 2020	Mount Lemmon	Mount Lemmon Survey	·	2.0 km	MPC · JPL
791771	2020 FG_{7}	—	April 18, 2015	Cerro Tololo	DECam	URS	2.4 km	MPC · JPL
791772	2020 FZ_{7}	—	October 24, 2011	Mount Lemmon	Mount Lemmon Survey	·	2.4 km	MPC · JPL
791773	2020 FN_{8}	—	March 16, 2020	Mount Lemmon	Mount Lemmon Survey	·	1.7 km	MPC · JPL
791774	2020 FO_{8}	—	March 22, 2020	Haleakala	Pan-STARRS 2	·	1.8 km	MPC · JPL
791775	2020 FS_{8}	—	January 14, 2019	Haleakala	Pan-STARRS 1	THM	1.8 km	MPC · JPL
791776	2020 FV_{8}	—	March 22, 2020	Haleakala	Pan-STARRS 1	TIR	2.1 km	MPC · JPL
791777	2020 FE_{9}	—	May 11, 2015	Mount Lemmon	Mount Lemmon Survey	·	1.4 km	MPC · JPL
791778	2020 FG_{9}	—	March 21, 2020	Haleakala	Pan-STARRS 1	·	1.9 km	MPC · JPL
791779	2020 FL_{9}	—	March 19, 2020	XuYi	PMO NEO Survey Program	·	2.5 km	MPC · JPL
791780	2020 FX_{9}	—	March 16, 2020	Mount Lemmon	Mount Lemmon Survey	·	1.9 km	MPC · JPL
791781	2020 FG_{10}	—	March 21, 2020	Haleakala	Pan-STARRS 1	·	1.7 km	MPC · JPL
791782	2020 FO_{11}	—	March 21, 2020	Haleakala	Pan-STARRS 1	·	2.1 km	MPC · JPL
791783	2020 FS_{11}	—	March 21, 2020	Haleakala	Pan-STARRS 1	·	1.8 km	MPC · JPL
791784	2020 FH_{12}	—	March 21, 2020	Haleakala	Pan-STARRS 1	·	2.2 km	MPC · JPL
791785	2020 FQ_{12}	—	September 22, 2016	Mount Lemmon	Mount Lemmon Survey	·	2.5 km	MPC · JPL
791786	2020 FL_{18}	—	March 21, 2020	Haleakala	Pan-STARRS 1	·	2.0 km	MPC · JPL
791787	2020 FS_{21}	—	March 21, 2020	Haleakala	Pan-STARRS 2	EUP	2.3 km	MPC · JPL
791788	2020 FK_{23}	—	April 24, 2014	Haleakala	Pan-STARRS 1	THB	2.2 km	MPC · JPL
791789	2020 FN_{26}	—	August 8, 2016	Haleakala	Pan-STARRS 1	·	1.4 km	MPC · JPL
791790	2020 FT_{26}	—	March 24, 2020	Mount Lemmon	Mount Lemmon Survey	·	2.0 km	MPC · JPL
791791	2020 FV_{28}	—	May 21, 2015	Cerro Tololo	DECam	·	1.6 km	MPC · JPL
791792	2020 FL_{30}	—	March 21, 2020	Haleakala	Pan-STARRS 1	·	2.0 km	MPC · JPL
791793	2020 FC_{31}	—	March 25, 2020	Mount Lemmon	Mount Lemmon Survey	·	2.6 km	MPC · JPL
791794	2020 FN_{32}	—	March 16, 2020	Mount Lemmon	Mount Lemmon Survey	·	2.1 km	MPC · JPL
791795	2020 FE_{33}	—	March 22, 2020	Haleakala	Pan-STARRS 2	·	2.4 km	MPC · JPL
791796	2020 FM_{34}	—	June 20, 2015	Haleakala	Pan-STARRS 1	·	2.7 km	MPC · JPL
791797	2020 FX_{34}	—	January 13, 2015	Haleakala	Pan-STARRS 1	·	970 m	MPC · JPL
791798	2020 FU_{35}	—	March 25, 2020	Mount Lemmon	Mount Lemmon Survey	LUT	2.7 km	MPC · JPL
791799	2020 FY_{43}	—	March 24, 2020	Haleakala	Pan-STARRS 1	·	1.9 km	MPC · JPL
791800	2020 FZ_{43}	—	March 24, 2020	Mount Lemmon	Mount Lemmon Survey	·	2.5 km	MPC · JPL

== 791801–791900 ==
back to top

Designation			Discovery			Properties		Ref
Permanent	Provisional	Named after	Date	Site	Discoverer(s)	Category	Diam.	Ref
791801	2020 FE_{45}	—	March 16, 2020	Cerro Tololo-DECam	DECam	·	1.9 km	MPC · JPL
791802	2020 GJ_{4}	—	April 3, 2020	Mount Lemmon	Mount Lemmon Survey	·	1.6 km	MPC · JPL
791803	2020 GQ_{4}	—	April 2, 2020	Haleakala	Pan-STARRS 2	·	2.5 km	MPC · JPL
791804	2020 GR_{4}	—	April 18, 2015	Cerro Tololo	DECam	·	1.3 km	MPC · JPL
791805	2020 GG_{6}	—	May 13, 2004	Kitt Peak	Spacewatch	·	1.6 km	MPC · JPL
791806	2020 GE_{8}	—	April 3, 2020	Mount Lemmon	Mount Lemmon Survey	·	1.7 km	MPC · JPL
791807	2020 GN_{9}	—	April 2, 2020	Mount Lemmon	Mount Lemmon Survey	·	2.1 km	MPC · JPL
791808	2020 GW_{12}	—	April 3, 2020	Mount Lemmon	Mount Lemmon Survey	L5	5.8 km	MPC · JPL
791809	2020 GJ_{17}	—	April 15, 2020	Mount Lemmon	Mount Lemmon Survey	·	1.9 km	MPC · JPL
791810	2020 GP_{19}	—	May 20, 2015	Cerro Tololo	DECam	HYG	2.0 km	MPC · JPL
791811	2020 GB_{23}	—	October 24, 2011	Haleakala	Pan-STARRS 1	·	2.1 km	MPC · JPL
791812	2020 GW_{23}	—	April 3, 2020	Mount Lemmon	Mount Lemmon Survey	THM	1.6 km	MPC · JPL
791813	2020 GG_{26}	—	October 9, 2012	Haleakala	Pan-STARRS 1	EOS	1.2 km	MPC · JPL
791814	2020 GH_{27}	—	April 2, 2020	Mount Lemmon	Mount Lemmon Survey	EUN	890 m	MPC · JPL
791815	2020 GY_{28}	—	May 24, 2015	Haleakala	Pan-STARRS 1	THM	1.7 km	MPC · JPL
791816	2020 GM_{29}	—	January 20, 2015	Haleakala	Pan-STARRS 1	NEM	1.6 km	MPC · JPL
791817	2020 GK_{30}	—	October 11, 2012	Haleakala	Pan-STARRS 1	LIX	2.1 km	MPC · JPL
791818	2020 GB_{31}	—	April 2, 2020	Mount Lemmon	Mount Lemmon Survey	·	1.9 km	MPC · JPL
791819	2020 GH_{32}	—	April 2, 2020	Mount Lemmon	Mount Lemmon Survey	·	1.8 km	MPC · JPL
791820	2020 GH_{33}	—	March 31, 2003	Kitt Peak	Spacewatch	·	1.0 km	MPC · JPL
791821	2020 HP_{11}	—	April 16, 2020	Mount Lemmon	Mount Lemmon Survey	·	2.5 km	MPC · JPL
791822	2020 HB_{12}	—	April 16, 2020	Mount Lemmon	Mount Lemmon Survey	·	1.2 km	MPC · JPL
791823	2020 HD_{12}	—	May 24, 2015	Haleakala	Pan-STARRS 1	·	1.3 km	MPC · JPL
791824	2020 HM_{14}	—	April 24, 2020	Mount Lemmon	Mount Lemmon Survey	·	2.6 km	MPC · JPL
791825	2020 HC_{15}	—	July 19, 2015	Haleakala	Pan-STARRS 1	·	2.1 km	MPC · JPL
791826	2020 HG_{17}	—	March 10, 2014	Mount Lemmon	Mount Lemmon Survey	LIX	2.5 km	MPC · JPL
791827	2020 HM_{17}	—	March 27, 2009	Mount Lemmon	Mount Lemmon Survey	·	1.9 km	MPC · JPL
791828	2020 HP_{19}	—	December 31, 2018	Haleakala	Pan-STARRS 1	·	2.2 km	MPC · JPL
791829	2020 HU_{22}	—	February 26, 2014	Haleakala	Pan-STARRS 1	·	1.8 km	MPC · JPL
791830	2020 HF_{23}	—	December 31, 2018	Haleakala	Pan-STARRS 1	·	1.9 km	MPC · JPL
791831	2020 HS_{23}	—	April 8, 2014	Mount Lemmon	Mount Lemmon Survey	THB	2.2 km	MPC · JPL
791832	2020 HV_{23}	—	April 21, 2020	Haleakala	Pan-STARRS 1	·	1.8 km	MPC · JPL
791833	2020 HB_{28}	—	March 26, 2014	Mount Lemmon	Mount Lemmon Survey	·	2.1 km	MPC · JPL
791834	2020 HU_{28}	—	April 16, 2020	Mount Lemmon	Mount Lemmon Survey	·	2.3 km	MPC · JPL
791835	2020 HB_{30}	—	November 28, 2013	Kitt Peak	Spacewatch	·	1.5 km	MPC · JPL
791836	2020 HJ_{30}	—	December 31, 2018	Haleakala	Pan-STARRS 1	AEG	1.8 km	MPC · JPL
791837	2020 HR_{34}	—	April 23, 2014	Cerro Tololo	DECam	·	2.0 km	MPC · JPL
791838	2020 HW_{34}	—	April 16, 2020	Mount Lemmon	Mount Lemmon Survey	HYG	2.0 km	MPC · JPL
791839	2020 HC_{35}	—	April 16, 2020	Mount Lemmon	Mount Lemmon Survey	·	2.2 km	MPC · JPL
791840	2020 HM_{36}	—	March 11, 2014	Mount Lemmon	Mount Lemmon Survey	·	1.9 km	MPC · JPL
791841	2020 HD_{38}	—	April 21, 2020	Haleakala	Pan-STARRS 1	L5	6.3 km	MPC · JPL
791842	2020 HJ_{38}	—	April 21, 2020	Haleakala	Pan-STARRS 2	·	1.9 km	MPC · JPL
791843	2020 HS_{38}	—	April 21, 2020	Haleakala	Pan-STARRS 1	·	2.0 km	MPC · JPL
791844	2020 HG_{39}	—	May 15, 2015	Haleakala	Pan-STARRS 1	·	1.9 km	MPC · JPL
791845	2020 HM_{42}	—	January 30, 2017	Mount Lemmon	Mount Lemmon Survey	L5	6.9 km	MPC · JPL
791846	2020 HQ_{44}	—	April 29, 2009	Kitt Peak	Spacewatch	·	1.9 km	MPC · JPL
791847	2020 HF_{46}	—	April 16, 2020	Mount Lemmon	Mount Lemmon Survey	·	2.9 km	MPC · JPL
791848	2020 HW_{53}	—	April 21, 2020	Haleakala	Pan-STARRS 1	·	2.3 km	MPC · JPL
791849	2020 HC_{57}	—	March 31, 2009	Mount Lemmon	Mount Lemmon Survey	TIR	2.4 km	MPC · JPL
791850	2020 HB_{66}	—	April 21, 2020	Haleakala	Pan-STARRS 2	·	2.0 km	MPC · JPL
791851	2020 HG_{66}	—	April 22, 2020	Mount Lemmon	Mount Lemmon Survey	·	2.5 km	MPC · JPL
791852	2020 HS_{66}	—	January 3, 2019	Haleakala	Pan-STARRS 1	·	1.6 km	MPC · JPL
791853	2020 HA_{67}	—	April 22, 2020	Haleakala	Pan-STARRS 1	·	2.1 km	MPC · JPL
791854	2020 HE_{67}	—	April 22, 2020	Haleakala	Pan-STARRS 1	·	2.2 km	MPC · JPL
791855	2020 HG_{67}	—	April 22, 2020	Haleakala	Pan-STARRS 1	·	2.1 km	MPC · JPL
791856	2020 HO_{67}	—	April 27, 2020	Haleakala	Pan-STARRS 1	L5	5.9 km	MPC · JPL
791857	2020 HT_{67}	—	April 27, 2020	Haleakala	Pan-STARRS 2	·	2.3 km	MPC · JPL
791858	2020 HT_{72}	—	August 28, 2005	Kitt Peak	Spacewatch	·	1.8 km	MPC · JPL
791859	2020 HX_{75}	—	November 12, 2006	Mount Lemmon	Mount Lemmon Survey	·	1.7 km	MPC · JPL
791860	2020 HE_{81}	—	April 18, 2020	Haleakala	Pan-STARRS 2	L5	6.2 km	MPC · JPL
791861	2020 HA_{82}	—	October 27, 2017	Mount Lemmon	Mount Lemmon Survey	VER	2.1 km	MPC · JPL
791862	2020 HE_{83}	—	October 5, 2013	Mount Lemmon	Mount Lemmon Survey	L5	6.0 km	MPC · JPL
791863	2020 HM_{84}	—	April 16, 2020	Mount Lemmon	Mount Lemmon Survey	VER	2.0 km	MPC · JPL
791864	2020 HL_{88}	—	April 21, 2020	Haleakala	Pan-STARRS 2	·	2.1 km	MPC · JPL
791865	2020 HN_{91}	—	April 10, 2015	Mount Lemmon	Mount Lemmon Survey	·	1.4 km	MPC · JPL
791866	2020 HQ_{91}	—	April 21, 2020	Haleakala	Pan-STARRS 2	·	1.5 km	MPC · JPL
791867	2020 HC_{94}	—	April 18, 2015	Cerro Tololo	DECam	·	1.4 km	MPC · JPL
791868	2020 HR_{98}	—	April 27, 2020	Mount Lemmon	Mount Lemmon Survey	·	2.2 km	MPC · JPL
791869	2020 HD_{99}	—	April 16, 2020	Mount Lemmon	Mount Lemmon Survey	·	2.1 km	MPC · JPL
791870	2020 HE_{99}	—	April 22, 2020	Haleakala	Pan-STARRS 1	VER	1.9 km	MPC · JPL
791871	2020 HV_{109}	—	September 7, 2008	Mount Lemmon	Mount Lemmon Survey	·	1.2 km	MPC · JPL
791872	2020 HD_{111}	—	October 15, 2017	Mount Lemmon	Mount Lemmon Survey	·	1.7 km	MPC · JPL
791873	2020 HS_{112}	—	April 16, 2020	Mount Lemmon	Mount Lemmon Survey	·	1.9 km	MPC · JPL
791874	2020 HV_{112}	—	April 16, 2020	Mount Lemmon	Mount Lemmon Survey	EUP	2.6 km	MPC · JPL
791875	2020 HA_{114}	—	April 22, 2009	Mount Lemmon	Mount Lemmon Survey	·	2.0 km	MPC · JPL
791876	2020 HQ_{114}	—	April 22, 2020	Haleakala	Pan-STARRS 1	L5	6.4 km	MPC · JPL
791877	2020 HR_{114}	—	April 22, 2020	Haleakala	Pan-STARRS 1	·	1.8 km	MPC · JPL
791878	2020 HH_{116}	—	April 19, 2020	Haleakala	Pan-STARRS 1	L5	6.7 km	MPC · JPL
791879	2020 HD_{117}	—	April 16, 2020	Mount Lemmon	Mount Lemmon Survey	·	1.6 km	MPC · JPL
791880	2020 HY_{117}	—	April 27, 2020	Haleakala	Pan-STARRS 1	·	2.3 km	MPC · JPL
791881	2020 HW_{118}	—	April 21, 2020	Haleakala	Pan-STARRS 2	·	1.9 km	MPC · JPL
791882	2020 HQ_{119}	—	September 19, 2017	Haleakala	Pan-STARRS 1	AST	1.1 km	MPC · JPL
791883	2020 HT_{122}	—	April 28, 2020	Haleakala	Pan-STARRS 1	L5	5.6 km	MPC · JPL
791884	2020 HT_{125}	—	April 25, 2014	Cerro Tololo	DECam	·	2.3 km	MPC · JPL
791885	2020 HT_{138}	—	November 10, 2017	Haleakala	Pan-STARRS 1	·	2.1 km	MPC · JPL
791886	2020 HU_{141}	—	April 20, 2020	Haleakala	Pan-STARRS 1	·	2.1 km	MPC · JPL
791887	2020 HJ_{144}	—	April 21, 2020	Haleakala	Pan-STARRS 2	·	2.3 km	MPC · JPL
791888	2020 HM_{146}	—	April 19, 2020	Haleakala	Pan-STARRS 1	VER	1.8 km	MPC · JPL
791889	2020 HP_{150}	—	April 20, 2020	Haleakala	Pan-STARRS 1	·	1.8 km	MPC · JPL
791890	2020 HT_{154}	—	October 2, 2005	Mount Lemmon	Mount Lemmon Survey	·	1.8 km	MPC · JPL
791891	2020 HO_{160}	—	December 13, 2018	Haleakala	Pan-STARRS 1	VER	1.8 km	MPC · JPL
791892	2020 HP_{162}	—	February 13, 2008	Mount Lemmon	Mount Lemmon Survey	·	2.1 km	MPC · JPL
791893	2020 HU_{162}	—	April 27, 2020	Haleakala	Pan-STARRS 1	·	2.3 km	MPC · JPL
791894	2020 HJ_{165}	—	April 17, 2020	Haleakala	Pan-STARRS 1	·	1.5 km	MPC · JPL
791895	2020 HQ_{166}	—	March 3, 2014	Cerro Tololo	High Cadence Transient Survey	EOS	1.3 km	MPC · JPL
791896	2020 HM_{167}	—	April 24, 2020	Mount Lemmon	Mount Lemmon Survey	LIX	2.7 km	MPC · JPL
791897	2020 HQ_{169}	—	April 19, 2020	Haleakala	Pan-STARRS 1	·	2.0 km	MPC · JPL
791898	2020 HD_{179}	—	April 28, 2020	Haleakala	Pan-STARRS 1	·	2.0 km	MPC · JPL
791899	2020 HH_{179}	—	September 1, 2013	Mount Lemmon	Mount Lemmon Survey	L5	5.9 km	MPC · JPL
791900	2020 HE_{180}	—	April 19, 2020	Haleakala	Pan-STARRS 1	L5	6.2 km	MPC · JPL

== 791901–792000 ==
back to top

Designation			Discovery			Properties		Ref
Permanent	Provisional	Named after	Date	Site	Discoverer(s)	Category	Diam.	Ref
791901	2020 HP_{180}	—	April 19, 2020	Haleakala	Pan-STARRS 1	L5	5.5 km	MPC · JPL
791902	2020 HH_{184}	—	March 22, 2014	Catalina	CSS	·	1.9 km	MPC · JPL
791903	2020 HO_{185}	—	April 20, 2020	Haleakala	Pan-STARRS 2	·	1.1 km	MPC · JPL
791904	2020 JS_{5}	—	May 2, 2020	Mount Lemmon	Mount Lemmon Survey	·	2.4 km	MPC · JPL
791905	2020 JK_{18}	—	May 29, 2010	WISE	WISE	EUP	2.4 km	MPC · JPL
791906	2020 JR_{18}	—	June 27, 2015	Haleakala	Pan-STARRS 1	TIR	1.9 km	MPC · JPL
791907	2020 JV_{20}	—	May 15, 2020	Haleakala	Pan-STARRS 1	·	2.1 km	MPC · JPL
791908	2020 JB_{22}	—	May 15, 2020	Haleakala	Pan-STARRS 1	BRA	1.3 km	MPC · JPL
791909	2020 JT_{31}	—	May 21, 2015	Haleakala	Pan-STARRS 1	·	1.2 km	MPC · JPL
791910	2020 JT_{32}	—	May 15, 2020	Haleakala	Pan-STARRS 1	·	2.0 km	MPC · JPL
791911	2020 JY_{35}	—	May 1, 2020	Haleakala	Pan-STARRS 1	·	2.7 km	MPC · JPL
791912	2020 JC_{36}	—	February 28, 2008	Mount Lemmon	Mount Lemmon Survey	URS	2.3 km	MPC · JPL
791913	2020 JE_{36}	—	May 14, 2020	Haleakala	Pan-STARRS 1	·	2.3 km	MPC · JPL
791914	2020 JH_{45}	—	August 14, 2016	Haleakala	Pan-STARRS 1	VER	2.0 km	MPC · JPL
791915	2020 JK_{45}	—	October 25, 2016	Haleakala	Pan-STARRS 1	·	2.5 km	MPC · JPL
791916	2020 JM_{45}	—	May 15, 2020	Haleakala	Pan-STARRS 1	·	2.3 km	MPC · JPL
791917	2020 JR_{45}	—	October 20, 2006	Kitt Peak	Deep Ecliptic Survey	·	1.8 km	MPC · JPL
791918	2020 JU_{45}	—	March 28, 2014	Mount Lemmon	Mount Lemmon Survey	VER	1.8 km	MPC · JPL
791919	2020 JC_{46}	—	May 23, 2014	Haleakala	Pan-STARRS 1	·	2.0 km	MPC · JPL
791920	2020 JL_{50}	—	May 15, 2020	Haleakala	Pan-STARRS 1	·	2.7 km	MPC · JPL
791921	2020 KY_{9}	—	January 7, 2019	Haleakala	Pan-STARRS 1	EUP	2.7 km	MPC · JPL
791922	2020 KK_{10}	—	May 24, 2020	Haleakala	Pan-STARRS 2	THB	2.2 km	MPC · JPL
791923	2020 KF_{14}	—	December 23, 2017	Haleakala	Pan-STARRS 1	·	2.8 km	MPC · JPL
791924	2020 KY_{34}	—	May 28, 2020	Haleakala	Pan-STARRS 1	L5	6.2 km	MPC · JPL
791925	2020 KZ_{36}	—	May 20, 2020	Haleakala	Pan-STARRS 1	·	1.9 km	MPC · JPL
791926	2020 KG_{37}	—	September 11, 2010	Mount Lemmon	Mount Lemmon Survey	·	2.0 km	MPC · JPL
791927	2020 KN_{37}	—	May 20, 2020	Haleakala	Pan-STARRS 2	·	2.0 km	MPC · JPL
791928	2020 KR_{37}	—	April 7, 2014	Mount Lemmon	Mount Lemmon Survey	T_{j} (2.97)	2.3 km	MPC · JPL
791929	2020 KR_{45}	—	May 20, 2020	Haleakala	Pan-STARRS 1	·	1.9 km	MPC · JPL
791930	2020 KD_{51}	—	May 21, 2020	Haleakala	Pan-STARRS 1	L5	6.5 km	MPC · JPL
791931	2020 KW_{61}	—	May 20, 2020	Haleakala	Pan-STARRS 1	·	1.8 km	MPC · JPL
791932	2020 LS_{13}	—	October 12, 2010	Mount Lemmon	Mount Lemmon Survey	·	2.1 km	MPC · JPL
791933	2020 LX_{13}	—	May 20, 2014	Haleakala	Pan-STARRS 1	·	2.2 km	MPC · JPL
791934	2020 MQ_{27}	—	June 28, 2020	Haleakala	Pan-STARRS 1	·	1.1 km	MPC · JPL
791935	2020 MX_{36}	—	March 17, 2015	Mount Lemmon	Mount Lemmon Survey	·	1.1 km	MPC · JPL
791936	2020 MG_{41}	—	May 20, 2015	Cerro Tololo	DECam	KOR	1.2 km	MPC · JPL
791937	2020 MR_{43}	—	June 17, 2020	Haleakala	Pan-STARRS 1	·	1.3 km	MPC · JPL
791938	2020 MB_{45}	—	June 22, 2020	Haleakala	Pan-STARRS 1	·	1.0 km	MPC · JPL
791939	2020 MX_{46}	—	June 28, 2020	Haleakala	Pan-STARRS 1	·	1.0 km	MPC · JPL
791940	2020 NU_{6}	—	September 11, 2010	Mount Lemmon	Mount Lemmon Survey	·	1.7 km	MPC · JPL
791941	2020 OU_{6}	—	July 25, 2020	Haleakala	Pan-STARRS 1	·	1.4 km	MPC · JPL
791942	2020 OQ_{7}	—	July 18, 2020	Haleakala	Pan-STARRS 1	AMO	220 m	MPC · JPL
791943	2020 OS_{12}	—	July 18, 2020	Haleakala	Pan-STARRS 1	L4	7.4 km	MPC · JPL
791944	2020 OB_{13}	—	July 16, 2020	Haleakala	Pan-STARRS 1	·	2.6 km	MPC · JPL
791945	2020 OM_{25}	—	October 12, 2007	Mount Lemmon	Mount Lemmon Survey	·	1.4 km	MPC · JPL
791946	2020 ON_{34}	—	April 29, 2014	Cerro Tololo	DECam	·	1.3 km	MPC · JPL
791947	2020 OP_{35}	—	January 10, 2008	Mauna Kea	P. A. Wiegert	·	1.1 km	MPC · JPL
791948	2020 OB_{65}	—	July 30, 2020	Haleakala	Pan-STARRS 1	MAR	940 m	MPC · JPL
791949	2020 OA_{66}	—	July 30, 2020	Haleakala	Pan-STARRS 1	·	1.0 km	MPC · JPL
791950	2020 OX_{79}	—	July 17, 2020	Haleakala	Pan-STARRS 1	L4	5.6 km	MPC · JPL
791951	2020 OJ_{80}	—	September 20, 2011	Mount Lemmon	Mount Lemmon Survey	·	1.5 km	MPC · JPL
791952	2020 OL_{80}	—	July 30, 2020	Mount Lemmon	Mount Lemmon Survey	L4	6.4 km	MPC · JPL
791953	2020 OQ_{86}	—	May 1, 2016	Cerro Tololo	DECam	L4	6.2 km	MPC · JPL
791954	2020 OL_{100}	—	July 29, 2020	Haleakala	Pan-STARRS 1	L4	6.6 km	MPC · JPL
791955	2020 OF_{102}	—	July 31, 2020	Haleakala	Pan-STARRS 1	(12739)	1.3 km	MPC · JPL
791956	2020 ON_{108}	—	July 30, 2020	Haleakala	Pan-STARRS 1	MAR	840 m	MPC · JPL
791957	2020 OU_{129}	—	December 1, 2011	Haleakala	Pan-STARRS 1	·	1.9 km	MPC · JPL
791958	2020 PZ_{8}	—	May 7, 2019	Haleakala	Pan-STARRS 1	·	710 m	MPC · JPL
791959	2020 PX_{16}	—	August 14, 2020	Haleakala	Pan-STARRS 1	L4	5.9 km	MPC · JPL
791960	2020 PQ_{21}	—	August 13, 2020	Haleakala	Pan-STARRS 1	EOS	1.2 km	MPC · JPL
791961	2020 PT_{22}	—	August 14, 2020	Haleakala	Pan-STARRS 2	EUN	840 m	MPC · JPL
791962	2020 PF_{50}	—	August 13, 2020	Haleakala	Pan-STARRS 1	L4 · ERY	5.0 km	MPC · JPL
791963	2020 PL_{53}	—	August 14, 2020	Haleakala	Pan-STARRS 1	L4 · ERY	5.3 km	MPC · JPL
791964	2020 PX_{53}	—	October 27, 2009	Mount Lemmon	Mount Lemmon Survey	L4	6.8 km	MPC · JPL
791965	2020 PA_{54}	—	August 14, 2020	Haleakala	Pan-STARRS 1	L4	6.9 km	MPC · JPL
791966	2020 PO_{54}	—	December 23, 2012	Haleakala	Pan-STARRS 1	L4	6.2 km	MPC · JPL
791967	2020 PB_{55}	—	April 18, 2015	Cerro Tololo	DECam	L4	5.4 km	MPC · JPL
791968	2020 PU_{55}	—	September 7, 2008	Mount Lemmon	Mount Lemmon Survey	L4	6.2 km	MPC · JPL
791969	2020 PN_{56}	—	August 14, 2020	Haleakala	Pan-STARRS 1	L4	6.8 km	MPC · JPL
791970	2020 PK_{63}	—	August 14, 2020	Haleakala	Pan-STARRS 1	L4	5.9 km	MPC · JPL
791971	2020 PL_{65}	—	August 12, 2020	Haleakala	Pan-STARRS 1	·	1.6 km	MPC · JPL
791972	2020 PJ_{70}	—	February 16, 2015	Haleakala	Pan-STARRS 1	L4	5.6 km	MPC · JPL
791973	2020 PF_{74}	—	July 25, 2019	Haleakala	Pan-STARRS 1	L4	6.3 km	MPC · JPL
791974	2020 PH_{75}	—	August 15, 2020	Haleakala	Pan-STARRS 1	L4	5.3 km	MPC · JPL
791975	2020 PM_{75}	—	August 13, 2020	Haleakala	Pan-STARRS 1	L4	5.2 km	MPC · JPL
791976	2020 PH_{76}	—	June 24, 2014	Haleakala	Pan-STARRS 1	·	2.8 km	MPC · JPL
791977	2020 PD_{81}	—	August 14, 2020	Haleakala	Pan-STARRS 1	L4	6.0 km	MPC · JPL
791978	2020 PA_{82}	—	February 27, 2014	Mount Lemmon	Mount Lemmon Survey	L4 · 006	6.3 km	MPC · JPL
791979	2020 PM_{87}	—	August 14, 2020	Haleakala	Pan-STARRS 1	L4	6.2 km	MPC · JPL
791980	2020 PQ_{92}	—	August 14, 2020	Haleakala	Pan-STARRS 1	L4	5.5 km	MPC · JPL
791981	2020 PJ_{94}	—	November 2, 2010	Mount Lemmon	Mount Lemmon Survey	L4 · ERY	5.9 km	MPC · JPL
791982	2020 PY_{111}	—	August 13, 2020	Haleakala	Pan-STARRS 1	L4	5.8 km	MPC · JPL
791983	2020 QP_{6}	—	August 26, 2020	Mount Lemmon	Mount Lemmon Survey	APO	260 m	MPC · JPL
791984	2020 QM_{9}	—	September 4, 2014	Haleakala	Pan-STARRS 1	·	2.9 km	MPC · JPL
791985	2020 QL_{17}	—	August 18, 2020	Haleakala	Pan-STARRS 1	L4 · ERY	5.7 km	MPC · JPL
791986	2020 QE_{37}	—	August 18, 2020	Haleakala	Pan-STARRS 1	L4	4.9 km	MPC · JPL
791987	2020 QU_{37}	—	June 9, 2019	Haleakala	Pan-STARRS 1	L4	6.9 km	MPC · JPL
791988	2020 QQ_{50}	—	August 23, 2020	Haleakala	Pan-STARRS 1	·	1.1 km	MPC · JPL
791989	2020 QL_{51}	—	August 23, 2020	Haleakala	Pan-STARRS 1	·	1.0 km	MPC · JPL
791990	2020 QN_{52}	—	August 16, 2020	Haleakala	Pan-STARRS 2	·	1.6 km	MPC · JPL
791991	2020 QQ_{65}	—	May 1, 2016	Cerro Tololo	DECam	L4	6.1 km	MPC · JPL
791992	2020 QG_{67}	—	April 18, 2015	Cerro Tololo	DECam	L4	5.9 km	MPC · JPL
791993	2020 QJ_{70}	—	April 18, 2015	Cerro Tololo	DECam	L4	5.5 km	MPC · JPL
791994	2020 QC_{75}	—	October 13, 2010	Mount Lemmon	Mount Lemmon Survey	L4 · ERY	5.4 km	MPC · JPL
791995	2020 QV_{75}	—	August 18, 2020	Haleakala	Pan-STARRS 1	L4 · ERY	5.5 km	MPC · JPL
791996	2020 QA_{76}	—	August 19, 2020	Haleakala	Pan-STARRS 1	L4	5.3 km	MPC · JPL
791997	2020 QC_{77}	—	May 1, 2016	Cerro Tololo	DECam	L4 · ERY	5.1 km	MPC · JPL
791998	2020 QJ_{77}	—	February 28, 2014	Haleakala	Pan-STARRS 1	L4	5.9 km	MPC · JPL
791999	2020 QF_{84}	—	August 19, 2020	Haleakala	Pan-STARRS 1	L4	6.3 km	MPC · JPL
792000	2020 QO_{84}	—	August 23, 2020	Haleakala	Pan-STARRS 1	L4	6.0 km	MPC · JPL

back to top
