= List of minor planets: 811001–812000 =

The following is a partial list of minor planets, running from minor-planet number 811001 through 812000, inclusive. The primary data for this and other partial lists is based on JPL's "Small-Body Orbital Elements" and data available from the Minor Planet Center. Critical list information is also provided by the MPC, unless otherwise specified from Lowell Observatory. A detailed description of the table's columns and additional sources are given on the main page including a complete list of every page in this series, and a statistical break-up on the dynamical classification of minor planets.

Also see the summary list of all named bodies in numerical and alphabetical order, and the corresponding naming citations for the number range of this particular list. New namings may only be added to this list after official publication, as the preannouncement of names is condemned by the Working Group for Small Bodies Nomenclature of the International Astronomical Union.

Near-Earth obj.	MBA (inner)	MBA (outer)	Centaur
Mars-crosser	MBA (middle)	Jupiter trojan	Trans-Neptunian obj.
Unclassified

== 811001–811100 ==
Designation			Discovery			Properties		Ref
Permanent	Provisional	Named after	Date	Site	Discoverer(s)	Category	Diam.	Ref
811001	2021 NJ_{65}	—	July 11, 2021	Haleakala	Pan-STARRS 1	·	1.3 km	MPC · JPL
811002	2021 NX_{65}	—	July 7, 2021	Haleakala	Pan-STARRS 1	·	2.2 km	MPC · JPL
811003	2021 NQ_{66}	—	July 15, 2021	Cerro Tololo-DECam	DECam	EOS	1.3 km	MPC · JPL
811004	2021 NM_{68}	—	January 6, 2013	Kitt Peak	Spacewatch	·	1.8 km	MPC · JPL
811005	2021 NN_{68}	—	October 27, 2016	Mount Lemmon	Mount Lemmon Survey	·	2.2 km	MPC · JPL
811006	2021 OF_{3}	—	July 30, 2021	Haleakala	Pan-STARRS 1	·	1.8 km	MPC · JPL
811007	2021 OS_{4}	—	February 27, 2015	Haleakala	Pan-STARRS 1	·	1.5 km	MPC · JPL
811008	2021 OH_{14}	—	November 10, 2016	Mount Lemmon	Mount Lemmon Survey	·	2.5 km	MPC · JPL
811009	2021 OD_{21}	—	July 16, 2021	Haleakala	Pan-STARRS 1	EOS	1.4 km	MPC · JPL
811010	2021 OT_{22}	—	July 31, 2021	Haleakala	Pan-STARRS 1	EOS	1.3 km	MPC · JPL
811011	2021 OA_{26}	—	July 30, 2021	Haleakala	Pan-STARRS 1	·	2.4 km	MPC · JPL
811012	2021 OG_{26}	—	July 31, 2021	Haleakala	Pan-STARRS 1	·	2.3 km	MPC · JPL
811013	2021 OJ_{26}	—	February 26, 2014	Haleakala	Pan-STARRS 1	·	1.3 km	MPC · JPL
811014	2021 PX_{3}	—	April 23, 2014	Cerro Tololo	DECam	·	2.0 km	MPC · JPL
811015	2021 PR_{4}	—	March 26, 2004	Kitt Peak	Deep Lens Survey	·	1.5 km	MPC · JPL
811016	2021 PP_{7}	—	July 14, 2016	Haleakala	Pan-STARRS 1	·	1.5 km	MPC · JPL
811017	2021 PU_{8}	—	September 26, 2016	Haleakala	Pan-STARRS 1	·	1.8 km	MPC · JPL
811018	2021 PN_{11}	—	August 7, 2021	Haleakala	Pan-STARRS 1	·	1.7 km	MPC · JPL
811019	2021 PH_{17}	—	September 23, 2011	Haleakala	Pan-STARRS 1	·	1.4 km	MPC · JPL
811020	2021 PZ_{19}	—	April 28, 2014	Cerro Tololo	DECam	·	1.9 km	MPC · JPL
811021	2021 PH_{26}	—	June 22, 2020	Haleakala	Pan-STARRS 2	EOS	1.3 km	MPC · JPL
811022	2021 PN_{37}	—	September 23, 2015	Haleakala	Pan-STARRS 1	·	2.9 km	MPC · JPL
811023	2021 PK_{42}	—	August 4, 2021	Haleakala	Pan-STARRS 1	VER	2.1 km	MPC · JPL
811024	2021 PS_{44}	—	June 23, 2015	Haleakala	Pan-STARRS 1	·	2.3 km	MPC · JPL
811025	2021 PV_{45}	—	October 25, 2011	Haleakala	Pan-STARRS 1	·	2.3 km	MPC · JPL
811026	2021 PN_{46}	—	September 25, 2016	Mount Lemmon	Mount Lemmon Survey	·	2.2 km	MPC · JPL
811027	2021 PV_{46}	—	April 28, 2014	Cerro Tololo	DECam	·	2.2 km	MPC · JPL
811028	2021 PE_{61}	—	May 21, 2015	Haleakala	Pan-STARRS 1	·	1.4 km	MPC · JPL
811029	2021 PG_{64}	—	October 14, 2010	Mount Lemmon	Mount Lemmon Survey	·	2.2 km	MPC · JPL
811030	2021 PA_{70}	—	July 19, 2015	Haleakala	Pan-STARRS 1	·	2.0 km	MPC · JPL
811031	2021 PJ_{74}	—	August 4, 2021	Haleakala	Pan-STARRS 1	·	2.1 km	MPC · JPL
811032	2021 PF_{77}	—	May 14, 2020	Haleakala	Pan-STARRS 1	VER	1.7 km	MPC · JPL
811033	2021 PG_{77}	—	August 11, 2021	Haleakala	Pan-STARRS 1	·	1.2 km	MPC · JPL
811034	2021 PL_{82}	—	August 5, 2021	Haleakala	Pan-STARRS 1	·	2.0 km	MPC · JPL
811035	2021 PO_{91}	—	April 23, 2014	Cerro Tololo	DECam	·	2.1 km	MPC · JPL
811036	2021 PE_{92}	—	April 28, 2014	Cerro Tololo	DECam	URS	2.4 km	MPC · JPL
811037	2021 PX_{99}	—	May 23, 2014	Haleakala	Pan-STARRS 1	·	1.9 km	MPC · JPL
811038	2021 PV_{100}	—	August 12, 2021	Haleakala	Pan-STARRS 1	·	1.4 km	MPC · JPL
811039	2021 PV_{123}	—	July 25, 2015	Haleakala	Pan-STARRS 1	·	2.4 km	MPC · JPL
811040	2021 PP_{133}	—	August 7, 2021	Haleakala	Pan-STARRS 1	·	1.5 km	MPC · JPL
811041	2021 PA_{150}	—	April 28, 2014	Cerro Tololo	DECam	·	2.2 km	MPC · JPL
811042	2021 PC_{150}	—	October 24, 2011	Haleakala	Pan-STARRS 1	·	1.6 km	MPC · JPL
811043	2021 PL_{153}	—	August 9, 2021	Haleakala	Pan-STARRS 1	·	1.3 km	MPC · JPL
811044	2021 PE_{156}	—	May 23, 2014	Haleakala	Pan-STARRS 1	·	2.1 km	MPC · JPL
811045	2021 PQ_{174}	—	December 27, 2011	Mount Lemmon	Mount Lemmon Survey	·	2.1 km	MPC · JPL
811046	2021 PS_{174}	—	August 9, 2021	Cerro Tololo-DECam	DECam	·	2.1 km	MPC · JPL
811047	2021 PY_{174}	—	August 4, 2021	Haleakala	Pan-STARRS 1	·	2.2 km	MPC · JPL
811048	2021 PG_{175}	—	August 12, 2021	Haleakala	Pan-STARRS 1	URS	1.9 km	MPC · JPL
811049	2021 PK_{176}	—	August 10, 2016	Haleakala	Pan-STARRS 1	·	2.2 km	MPC · JPL
811050	2021 PT_{176}	—	August 12, 2021	Haleakala	Pan-STARRS 1	·	2.6 km	MPC · JPL
811051	2021 PE_{181}	—	August 3, 2021	Haleakala	Pan-STARRS 1	·	1.7 km	MPC · JPL
811052	2021 PG_{185}	—	August 2, 2021	Haleakala	Pan-STARRS 1	EOS	1.5 km	MPC · JPL
811053	2021 PE_{210}	—	March 7, 2014	Mount Lemmon	Mount Lemmon Survey	·	1.9 km	MPC · JPL
811054	2021 PC_{211}	—	January 17, 2013	Kitt Peak	Spacewatch	(1298)	1.8 km	MPC · JPL
811055	2021 PW_{218}	—	March 31, 2019	Mount Lemmon	Mount Lemmon Survey	·	2.1 km	MPC · JPL
811056	2021 QU_{1}	—	October 17, 2012	Haleakala	Pan-STARRS 1	TIN	660 m	MPC · JPL
811057	2021 QG_{12}	—	October 31, 2010	Mount Lemmon	Mount Lemmon Survey	·	2.0 km	MPC · JPL
811058	2021 QD_{21}	—	April 20, 2009	Mount Lemmon	Mount Lemmon Survey	·	1.7 km	MPC · JPL
811059	2021 QG_{43}	—	August 30, 2021	Haleakala	Pan-STARRS 1	VER	1.9 km	MPC · JPL
811060	2021 QM_{44}	—	August 30, 2021	Haleakala	Pan-STARRS 1	(5)	980 m	MPC · JPL
811061	2021 QR_{53}	—	August 21, 2021	Haleakala	Pan-STARRS 2	·	2.1 km	MPC · JPL
811062	2021 QY_{53}	—	August 12, 2015	Haleakala	Pan-STARRS 1	·	2.5 km	MPC · JPL
811063	2021 QA_{59}	—	August 26, 2012	Haleakala	Pan-STARRS 1	·	1.1 km	MPC · JPL
811064	2021 QL_{78}	—	January 18, 2013	Haleakala	Pan-STARRS 1	EOS	1.3 km	MPC · JPL
811065	2021 QJ_{81}	—	May 26, 2015	Haleakala	Pan-STARRS 1	·	1.5 km	MPC · JPL
811066	2021 QG_{90}	—	February 26, 2014	Mount Lemmon	Mount Lemmon Survey	KOR	1.2 km	MPC · JPL
811067	2021 QV_{94}	—	August 31, 2021	Cerro Tololo-DECam	DECam	·	2.0 km	MPC · JPL
811068	2021 QF_{95}	—	August 16, 2021	Haleakala	Pan-STARRS 1	EOS	1.3 km	MPC · JPL
811069	2021 QD_{96}	—	August 16, 2021	Haleakala	Pan-STARRS 1	EOS	1.3 km	MPC · JPL
811070	2021 QG_{96}	—	August 16, 2021	Haleakala	Pan-STARRS 1	·	2.1 km	MPC · JPL
811071	2021 QM_{98}	—	March 31, 2019	Mount Lemmon	Mount Lemmon Survey	·	1.9 km	MPC · JPL
811072	2021 QQ_{98}	—	August 31, 2021	Haleakala	Pan-STARRS 1	KOR	1.2 km	MPC · JPL
811073	2021 QA_{104}	—	June 21, 2020	Haleakala	Pan-STARRS 1	·	1.9 km	MPC · JPL
811074	2021 QB_{120}	—	August 29, 2021	Haleakala	Pan-STARRS 1	·	1.8 km	MPC · JPL
811075	2021 RF_{13}	—	July 14, 2016	Haleakala	Pan-STARRS 1	AGN	870 m	MPC · JPL
811076	2021 RP_{22}	—	June 18, 2015	Haleakala	Pan-STARRS 1	·	1.9 km	MPC · JPL
811077	2021 RK_{23}	—	September 13, 2021	Haleakala	Pan-STARRS 1	L4	6.2 km	MPC · JPL
811078	2021 RL_{23}	—	May 5, 2016	Mount Lemmon	Mount Lemmon Survey	L4	7.8 km	MPC · JPL
811079	2021 RC_{34}	—	June 17, 2015	Haleakala	Pan-STARRS 1	·	2.0 km	MPC · JPL
811080	2021 RD_{34}	—	April 18, 2015	Cerro Tololo	DECam	·	1.3 km	MPC · JPL
811081	2021 RY_{39}	—	October 11, 2010	Mount Lemmon	Mount Lemmon Survey	VER	1.8 km	MPC · JPL
811082	2021 RC_{40}	—	September 5, 2021	Haleakala	Pan-STARRS 2	·	2.1 km	MPC · JPL
811083	2021 RQ_{40}	—	September 5, 2021	Haleakala	Pan-STARRS 2	·	2.6 km	MPC · JPL
811084	2021 RE_{47}	—	November 3, 2016	Haleakala	Pan-STARRS 1	·	1.9 km	MPC · JPL
811085	2021 RY_{47}	—	September 4, 2021	Haleakala	Pan-STARRS 1	L4	5.4 km	MPC · JPL
811086	2021 RS_{50}	—	May 20, 2015	Cerro Tololo	DECam	·	1.3 km	MPC · JPL
811087	2021 RF_{54}	—	April 22, 2009	Mount Lemmon	Mount Lemmon Survey	EOS	1.5 km	MPC · JPL
811088	2021 RS_{58}	—	March 3, 2009	Mount Lemmon	Mount Lemmon Survey	·	1.2 km	MPC · JPL
811089	2021 RC_{64}	—	November 14, 2010	Mount Lemmon	Mount Lemmon Survey	L4	5.7 km	MPC · JPL
811090	2021 RF_{64}	—	September 15, 2021	Haleakala	Pan-STARRS 2	L4	5.0 km	MPC · JPL
811091	2021 RO_{64}	—	September 14, 2020	Haleakala	Pan-STARRS 1	L4	6.1 km	MPC · JPL
811092	2021 RV_{71}	—	September 2, 2010	Mount Lemmon	Mount Lemmon Survey	·	1.7 km	MPC · JPL
811093	2021 RC_{75}	—	August 14, 2015	Haleakala	Pan-STARRS 1	·	2.1 km	MPC · JPL
811094	2021 RQ_{77}	—	May 23, 2014	Haleakala	Pan-STARRS 1	·	2.2 km	MPC · JPL
811095	2021 RZ_{84}	—	September 4, 2021	Haleakala	Pan-STARRS 1	KOR	1.0 km	MPC · JPL
811096	2021 RW_{87}	—	April 28, 2014	Cerro Tololo	DECam	·	2.1 km	MPC · JPL
811097	2021 RW_{88}	—	September 5, 2021	Haleakala	Pan-STARRS 1	·	2.3 km	MPC · JPL
811098	2021 RD_{92}	—	August 3, 2016	Haleakala	Pan-STARRS 1	AGN	810 m	MPC · JPL
811099	2021 RS_{93}	—	September 5, 2000	Sacramento Peak	SDSS	·	1.3 km	MPC · JPL
811100	2021 RT_{95}	—	September 9, 2021	Haleakala	Pan-STARRS 2	·	1.6 km	MPC · JPL

== 811101–811200 ==
back to top

Designation			Discovery			Properties		Ref
Permanent	Provisional	Named after	Date	Site	Discoverer(s)	Category	Diam.	Ref
811101	2021 RA_{102}	—	March 15, 2015	Mount Lemmon	Mount Lemmon Survey	H	510 m	MPC · JPL
811102	2021 RR_{104}	—	September 3, 2010	Mount Lemmon	Mount Lemmon Survey	·	1.9 km	MPC · JPL
811103	2021 RD_{107}	—	May 11, 2015	Mount Lemmon	Mount Lemmon Survey	HOF	1.8 km	MPC · JPL
811104	2021 RW_{109}	—	August 1, 2016	Haleakala	Pan-STARRS 1	·	1.0 km	MPC · JPL
811105	2021 RT_{113}	—	September 14, 2007	Mount Lemmon	Mount Lemmon Survey	·	1.3 km	MPC · JPL
811106	2021 RO_{116}	—	September 8, 2021	Haleakala	Pan-STARRS 1	EOS	1.4 km	MPC · JPL
811107	2021 RJ_{121}	—	September 10, 2020	Haleakala	Pan-STARRS 1	L4	5.5 km	MPC · JPL
811108	2021 RQ_{125}	—	May 7, 2014	Haleakala	Pan-STARRS 1	EOS	1.5 km	MPC · JPL
811109	2021 RU_{127}	—	September 10, 2021	Mount Lemmon	Mount Lemmon Survey	L4	6.2 km	MPC · JPL
811110 Ubartas	2021 RR_{130}	Ubartas	March 21, 2015	Mount Graham	K. Černis, R. P. Boyle	L4	6.0 km	MPC · JPL
811111	2021 RV_{151}	—	September 11, 2021	Haleakala	Pan-STARRS 2	·	730 m	MPC · JPL
811112	2021 RM_{153}	—	September 5, 2021	Haleakala	Pan-STARRS 1	ELF	2.3 km	MPC · JPL
811113	2021 RC_{172}	—	April 18, 2015	Cerro Tololo	DECam	L4	6.2 km	MPC · JPL
811114	2021 RT_{184}	—	February 5, 2013	Kitt Peak	Spacewatch	·	2.3 km	MPC · JPL
811115	2021 RZ_{184}	—	December 3, 2010	Mauna Kea	P. A. Wiegert	·	2.2 km	MPC · JPL
811116	2021 RL_{185}	—	September 19, 2017	Haleakala	Pan-STARRS 1	·	990 m	MPC · JPL
811117	2021 RG_{207}	—	December 29, 2011	Kitt Peak	Spacewatch	·	2.1 km	MPC · JPL
811118	2021 RJ_{207}	—	September 8, 2021	Haleakala	Pan-STARRS 2	L4	5.6 km	MPC · JPL
811119	2021 RB_{216}	—	September 10, 2021	Haleakala	Pan-STARRS 1	·	1.9 km	MPC · JPL
811120	2021 RJ_{217}	—	September 6, 2016	Mount Lemmon	Mount Lemmon Survey	EOS	1.4 km	MPC · JPL
811121	2021 RY_{220}	—	August 27, 2006	Kitt Peak	Spacewatch	·	1.5 km	MPC · JPL
811122	2021 RP_{234}	—	September 5, 2021	Haleakala	Pan-STARRS 1	·	1.4 km	MPC · JPL
811123	2021 RX_{246}	—	September 9, 2021	Haleakala	Pan-STARRS 1	·	2.2 km	MPC · JPL
811124	2021 SW_{10}	—	June 11, 2015	Haleakala	Pan-STARRS 1	KOR	1.1 km	MPC · JPL
811125	2021 SA_{14}	—	January 12, 2019	Haleakala	Pan-STARRS 1	·	2.5 km	MPC · JPL
811126	2021 SH_{36}	—	October 1, 2013	Mount Lemmon	Mount Lemmon Survey	T_{j} (2.96) · 3:2	4.6 km	MPC · JPL
811127	2021 SZ_{36}	—	April 18, 2015	Cerro Tololo	DECam	L4	5.6 km	MPC · JPL
811128	2021 SZ_{58}	—	September 28, 2021	Haleakala	Pan-STARRS 2	·	1.6 km	MPC · JPL
811129	2021 SE_{60}	—	September 30, 2021	Haleakala	Pan-STARRS 1	L4	4.7 km	MPC · JPL
811130	2021 SV_{74}	—	September 30, 2021	Haleakala	Pan-STARRS 1	L4	5.2 km	MPC · JPL
811131	2021 SP_{75}	—	May 18, 2010	WISE	WISE	ADE	1.2 km	MPC · JPL
811132	2021 TE_{15}	—	October 4, 2021	Haleakala	Pan-STARRS 2	L4	4.4 km	MPC · JPL
811133	2021 TB_{29}	—	April 18, 2015	Cerro Tololo	DECam	L4	5.3 km	MPC · JPL
811134	2021 TG_{38}	—	July 13, 2016	Haleakala	Pan-STARRS 1	·	850 m	MPC · JPL
811135	2021 TV_{42}	—	August 19, 2020	Haleakala	Pan-STARRS 1	L4	6.2 km	MPC · JPL
811136	2021 TQ_{58}	—	March 24, 2014	Haleakala	Pan-STARRS 1	·	1.3 km	MPC · JPL
811137	2021 TH_{60}	—	October 14, 2021	Haleakala	Pan-STARRS 1	·	1.5 km	MPC · JPL
811138	2021 TM_{68}	—	October 3, 2021	Haleakala	Pan-STARRS 1	L4 · ERY	4.9 km	MPC · JPL
811139	2021 TM_{71}	—	December 25, 2005	Kitt Peak	Spacewatch	·	790 m	MPC · JPL
811140	2021 TK_{75}	—	September 12, 2020	Haleakala	Pan-STARRS 1	L4	6.1 km	MPC · JPL
811141	2021 TC_{83}	—	October 4, 2021	Haleakala	Pan-STARRS 1	L4 · ERY	4.9 km	MPC · JPL
811142	2021 TH_{88}	—	September 14, 2020	Haleakala	Pan-STARRS 1	L4	5.8 km	MPC · JPL
811143	2021 TW_{92}	—	April 24, 2019	Haleakala	Pan-STARRS 1	·	1.1 km	MPC · JPL
811144	2021 TT_{96}	—	November 8, 2010	Mount Lemmon	Mount Lemmon Survey	L4	5.5 km	MPC · JPL
811145	2021 TQ_{98}	—	October 4, 2021	Haleakala	Pan-STARRS 1	·	1.3 km	MPC · JPL
811146	2021 TM_{134}	—	October 14, 2021	Haleakala	Pan-STARRS 2	·	2.5 km	MPC · JPL
811147	2021 TB_{135}	—	May 23, 2014	Haleakala	Pan-STARRS 1	EOS	1.3 km	MPC · JPL
811148	2021 TG_{135}	—	August 8, 2019	Haleakala	Pan-STARRS 1	L4	5.3 km	MPC · JPL
811149	2021 TG_{138}	—	October 3, 2021	Haleakala	Pan-STARRS 1	·	1.2 km	MPC · JPL
811150	2021 TV_{141}	—	October 3, 2021	Haleakala	Pan-STARRS 1	·	1.0 km	MPC · JPL
811151	2021 TA_{142}	—	October 2, 2021	Haleakala	Pan-STARRS 2	KOR	1.0 km	MPC · JPL
811152	2021 TU_{142}	—	January 16, 2018	Haleakala	Pan-STARRS 1	·	2.1 km	MPC · JPL
811153	2021 TK_{158}	—	October 13, 2021	Haleakala	Pan-STARRS 2	·	1.4 km	MPC · JPL
811154	2021 TO_{166}	—	October 4, 2021	Haleakala	Pan-STARRS 2	L4	5.8 km	MPC · JPL
811155	2021 TJ_{167}	—	October 11, 2021	Haleakala	Pan-STARRS 1	L4	4.7 km	MPC · JPL
811156	2021 TT_{169}	—	October 3, 2021	Haleakala	Pan-STARRS 2	·	1.4 km	MPC · JPL
811157	2021 TW_{208}	—	March 22, 2015	Haleakala	Pan-STARRS 1	L4	5.3 km	MPC · JPL
811158	2021 UL_{12}	—	October 27, 2021	Mount Lemmon	Mount Lemmon Survey	·	1.5 km	MPC · JPL
811159	2021 UG_{20}	—	September 10, 2020	Mount Lemmon	Mount Lemmon Survey	·	2.0 km	MPC · JPL
811160	2021 UY_{23}	—	October 18, 2012	Haleakala	Pan-STARRS 1	·	1.5 km	MPC · JPL
811161	2021 UH_{56}	—	September 29, 2009	Mount Lemmon	Mount Lemmon Survey	L4	5.6 km	MPC · JPL
811162	2021 UJ_{60}	—	October 31, 2021	Haleakala	Pan-STARRS 2	·	2.0 km	MPC · JPL
811163	2021 UJ_{64}	—	July 19, 2020	Haleakala	Pan-STARRS 1	LIX	2.6 km	MPC · JPL
811164	2021 US_{69}	—	October 27, 2021	Kitt Peak	Bok NEO Survey	L4 · (8060)	5.3 km	MPC · JPL
811165	2021 UX_{100}	—	October 29, 2021	Haleakala	Pan-STARRS 1	L4	5.6 km	MPC · JPL
811166	2021 UZ_{107}	—	October 27, 2021	Kitt Peak	Bok NEO Survey	L4	5.8 km	MPC · JPL
811167	2021 UX_{118}	—	October 9, 2015	Mount Lemmon	Mount Lemmon Survey	·	2.0 km	MPC · JPL
811168	2021 UJ_{120}	—	October 30, 2021	Haleakala	Pan-STARRS 2	L4	6.6 km	MPC · JPL
811169	2021 UM_{133}	—	February 13, 2013	Haleakala	Pan-STARRS 1	L4	5.5 km	MPC · JPL
811170	2021 VH_{6}	—	May 21, 2015	Haleakala	Pan-STARRS 1	L4 · HEK	5.8 km	MPC · JPL
811171	2021 VO_{26}	—	June 20, 2020	Haleakala	Pan-STARRS 1	·	2.3 km	MPC · JPL
811172	2021 VM_{30}	—	November 7, 2021	Haleakala	Pan-STARRS 1	L4	5.1 km	MPC · JPL
811173	2021 VH_{34}	—	October 24, 2008	Mount Lemmon	Mount Lemmon Survey	HNS	780 m	MPC · JPL
811174	2021 VA_{43}	—	November 1, 2021	Haleakala	Pan-STARRS 2	·	1.9 km	MPC · JPL
811175	2021 VG_{46}	—	November 6, 2012	Kitt Peak	Spacewatch	·	1.1 km	MPC · JPL
811176	2021 VM_{46}	—	June 15, 2018	Haleakala	Pan-STARRS 1	L4	5.7 km	MPC · JPL
811177	2021 VQ_{48}	—	November 1, 2021	Haleakala	Pan-STARRS 2	L4 · ERY	5.1 km	MPC · JPL
811178	2021 VH_{52}	—	December 19, 2015	Mount Lemmon	Mount Lemmon Survey	·	2.7 km	MPC · JPL
811179	2021 VZ_{53}	—	October 22, 2012	Mount Lemmon	Mount Lemmon Survey	·	1.0 km	MPC · JPL
811180	2021 VR_{60}	—	November 6, 2021	Haleakala	Pan-STARRS 2	·	1.1 km	MPC · JPL
811181	2021 VH_{63}	—	April 2, 2014	Kitt Peak	Spacewatch	·	1.4 km	MPC · JPL
811182	2021 VH_{72}	—	July 19, 2015	Haleakala	Pan-STARRS 1	KOR	860 m	MPC · JPL
811183	2021 VC_{80}	—	November 8, 2021	Haleakala	Pan-STARRS 1	L4	5.3 km	MPC · JPL
811184	2021 VH_{96}	—	November 8, 2021	Mount Lemmon	Mount Lemmon Survey	L4	6.2 km	MPC · JPL
811185	2021 VU_{96}	—	November 9, 2021	Haleakala	Pan-STARRS 1	L4	6.0 km	MPC · JPL
811186	2022 AN_{8}	—	June 26, 2015	Haleakala	Pan-STARRS 1	·	950 m	MPC · JPL
811187	2022 AE_{17}	—	January 9, 2022	Haleakala	Pan-STARRS 2	·	1.3 km	MPC · JPL
811188	2022 AJ_{29}	—	October 19, 2020	Haleakala	Pan-STARRS 1	AGN	910 m	MPC · JPL
811189	2022 AQ_{36}	—	January 6, 2022	Mount Lemmon	Mount Lemmon Survey	·	1.4 km	MPC · JPL
811190	2022 AH_{46}	—	January 7, 2022	Haleakala	Pan-STARRS 2	·	1.1 km	MPC · JPL
811191	2022 AB_{49}	—	February 9, 2013	Haleakala	Pan-STARRS 1	·	1.5 km	MPC · JPL
811192	2022 BK_{6}	—	April 5, 2014	Haleakala	Pan-STARRS 1	·	1.0 km	MPC · JPL
811193	2022 BM_{14}	—	February 9, 2005	Anderson Mesa	Wasserman, L. H.	·	1.1 km	MPC · JPL
811194	2022 BE_{15}	—	July 1, 2019	Haleakala	Pan-STARRS 1	·	2.1 km	MPC · JPL
811195	2022 BO_{26}	—	September 15, 2007	Mount Lemmon	Mount Lemmon Survey	·	930 m	MPC · JPL
811196	2022 BA_{28}	—	June 14, 2018	Haleakala	Pan-STARRS 1	·	1.4 km	MPC · JPL
811197	2022 BN_{33}	—	October 20, 2020	Haleakala	Pan-STARRS 1	HOF	1.7 km	MPC · JPL
811198	2022 BA_{38}	—	January 19, 2017	Mount Lemmon	Mount Lemmon Survey	·	1.3 km	MPC · JPL
811199	2022 BV_{40}	—	March 8, 2005	Mount Lemmon	Mount Lemmon Survey	·	1.1 km	MPC · JPL
811200	2022 BA_{45}	—	August 28, 2013	Mount Lemmon	Mount Lemmon Survey	·	2.2 km	MPC · JPL

== 811201–811300 ==
back to top

Designation			Discovery			Properties		Ref
Permanent	Provisional	Named after	Date	Site	Discoverer(s)	Category	Diam.	Ref
811201	2022 BT_{51}	—	February 27, 2014	Haleakala	Pan-STARRS 1	·	900 m	MPC · JPL
811202	2022 BL_{53}	—	January 2, 2017	Haleakala	Pan-STARRS 1	·	1.6 km	MPC · JPL
811203	2022 BD_{55}	—	April 5, 2008	Mount Lemmon	Mount Lemmon Survey	·	1.4 km	MPC · JPL
811204	2022 BE_{57}	—	January 25, 2022	Haleakala	Pan-STARRS 2	·	1.5 km	MPC · JPL
811205	2022 BG_{62}	—	November 17, 2014	Mount Lemmon	Mount Lemmon Survey	·	2.0 km	MPC · JPL
811206	2022 CX_{7}	—	February 16, 2013	Mount Lemmon	Mount Lemmon Survey	AST	1.1 km	MPC · JPL
811207	2022 CO_{12}	—	November 1, 2006	Kitt Peak	Spacewatch	·	1.3 km	MPC · JPL
811208	2022 CW_{16}	—	June 15, 2018	Haleakala	Pan-STARRS 1	·	2.0 km	MPC · JPL
811209	2022 CY_{22}	—	February 3, 2022	Haleakala	Pan-STARRS 2	·	1.9 km	MPC · JPL
811210	2022 CN_{35}	—	February 7, 2022	Haleakala	Pan-STARRS 2	·	2.8 km	MPC · JPL
811211	2022 CC_{37}	—	February 9, 2022	Haleakala	Pan-STARRS 2	·	1.4 km	MPC · JPL
811212	2022 CE_{39}	—	December 10, 2020	Haleakala	Pan-STARRS 1	·	1.4 km	MPC · JPL
811213	2022 DW_{8}	—	March 9, 2011	Mount Lemmon	Mount Lemmon Survey	·	2.2 km	MPC · JPL
811214	2022 DP_{10}	—	October 3, 2013	Mount Lemmon	Mount Lemmon Survey	·	2.4 km	MPC · JPL
811215	2022 DR_{11}	—	February 25, 2022	Haleakala	Pan-STARRS 2	H	310 m	MPC · JPL
811216	2022 DW_{19}	—	October 25, 2019	Haleakala	Pan-STARRS 1	·	2.2 km	MPC · JPL
811217	2022 EM_{11}	—	March 6, 2022	Haleakala	Pan-STARRS 2	·	2.0 km	MPC · JPL
811218	2022 EU_{16}	—	March 5, 2022	Haleakala	Pan-STARRS 2	·	1.2 km	MPC · JPL
811219	2022 EM_{19}	—	August 8, 2018	Haleakala	Pan-STARRS 1	·	2.1 km	MPC · JPL
811220	2022 ED_{31}	—	March 6, 2022	Haleakala	Pan-STARRS 2	·	1.0 km	MPC · JPL
811221	2022 FR_{3}	—	March 28, 2022	Mount Lemmon	Mount Lemmon Survey	AMO · APO	110 m	MPC · JPL
811222	2022 FN_{6}	—	March 27, 2022	Haleakala	Pan-STARRS 2	·	1.7 km	MPC · JPL
811223	2022 FO_{8}	—	April 2, 2005	Mount Lemmon	Mount Lemmon Survey	·	1.0 km	MPC · JPL
811224	2022 FG_{14}	—	March 23, 2022	Kitt Peak	Bok NEO Survey	KOR	940 m	MPC · JPL
811225	2022 FN_{14}	—	March 25, 2022	Kitt Peak	Bok NEO Survey	critical	2.0 km	MPC · JPL
811226	2022 FF_{18}	—	November 27, 2014	Haleakala	Pan-STARRS 1	·	1.6 km	MPC · JPL
811227	2022 GY_{10}	—	April 2, 2022	Haleakala	Pan-STARRS 2	·	1.3 km	MPC · JPL
811228	2022 GL_{12}	—	April 12, 2022	Haleakala	Pan-STARRS 2	EUP	3.0 km	MPC · JPL
811229	2022 GN_{13}	—	January 7, 2017	Mount Lemmon	Mount Lemmon Survey	·	990 m	MPC · JPL
811230	2022 GC_{16}	—	April 10, 2022	Haleakala	Pan-STARRS 2	·	970 m	MPC · JPL
811231	2022 GL_{16}	—	April 12, 2022	Haleakala	Pan-STARRS 2	·	1.5 km	MPC · JPL
811232	2022 GM_{26}	—	April 5, 2022	Mount Lemmon	Mount Lemmon Survey	EUN	840 m	MPC · JPL
811233	2022 GS_{28}	—	April 10, 2022	Haleakala	Pan-STARRS 2	·	2.4 km	MPC · JPL
811234	2022 GN_{30}	—	April 9, 2022	Mount Lemmon	Mount Lemmon Survey	·	1.3 km	MPC · JPL
811235	2022 HG_{8}	—	April 26, 2022	Haleakala	Pan-STARRS 2	·	1.3 km	MPC · JPL
811236	2022 HH_{10}	—	August 20, 2014	Haleakala	Pan-STARRS 1	·	1.1 km	MPC · JPL
811237	2022 HH_{11}	—	April 30, 2022	Haleakala	Pan-STARRS 2	·	1.2 km	MPC · JPL
811238	2022 HY_{15}	—	April 23, 2022	Haleakala	Pan-STARRS 2	TEL	830 m	MPC · JPL
811239	2022 HS_{18}	—	April 23, 2022	Haleakala	Pan-STARRS 2	·	1.4 km	MPC · JPL
811240	2022 HV_{18}	—	April 29, 2022	Haleakala	Pan-STARRS 2	·	2.3 km	MPC · JPL
811241	2022 HW_{20}	—	May 14, 2008	Mount Lemmon	Mount Lemmon Survey	·	1.3 km	MPC · JPL
811242	2022 HH_{21}	—	April 26, 2022	Haleakala	Pan-STARRS 2	ULA	3.2 km	MPC · JPL
811243	2022 HS_{21}	—	January 19, 2020	Haleakala	Pan-STARRS 1	·	2.2 km	MPC · JPL
811244	2022 JF_{4}	—	May 2, 2022	Mount Lemmon	Mount Lemmon Survey	·	2.2 km	MPC · JPL
811245	2022 JM_{5}	—	March 20, 2017	Haleakala	Pan-STARRS 1	·	1.5 km	MPC · JPL
811246	2022 JE_{8}	—	March 4, 2017	Haleakala	Pan-STARRS 1	AEO	820 m	MPC · JPL
811247	2022 JE_{9}	—	May 9, 2022	Haleakala	Pan-STARRS 2	·	1.1 km	MPC · JPL
811248	2022 KE_{4}	—	May 24, 2022	Haleakala	Pan-STARRS 2	·	2.7 km	MPC · JPL
811249	2022 KN_{8}	—	December 21, 2019	Mount Lemmon	Mount Lemmon Survey	·	1.8 km	MPC · JPL
811250	2022 KY_{21}	—	January 31, 2016	Haleakala	Pan-STARRS 1	·	1.3 km	MPC · JPL
811251	2022 KY_{26}	—	April 9, 2021	Haleakala	Pan-STARRS 1	MAR	790 m	MPC · JPL
811252	2022 KW_{34}	—	November 5, 2019	Mount Lemmon	Mount Lemmon Survey	·	1.1 km	MPC · JPL
811253	2022 LF_{4}	—	September 9, 2018	Mount Lemmon	Mount Lemmon Survey	·	1.2 km	MPC · JPL
811254	2022 LR_{4}	—	June 1, 2022	Haleakala	Pan-STARRS 2	L5	5.7 km	MPC · JPL
811255	2022 LG_{6}	—	June 11, 2022	Haleakala	Pan-STARRS 2	·	2.2 km	MPC · JPL
811256	2022 LE_{9}	—	January 17, 2021	Mount Lemmon	Mount Lemmon Survey	EUN	750 m	MPC · JPL
811257	2022 LN_{19}	—	June 4, 2022	Haleakala	Pan-STARRS 2	·	1.3 km	MPC · JPL
811258	2022 MG_{8}	—	June 21, 2022	Haleakala	Pan-STARRS 2	MAR	710 m	MPC · JPL
811259	2022 MM_{8}	—	June 29, 2022	Haleakala	Pan-STARRS 2	L5	6.6 km	MPC · JPL
811260	2022 MF_{13}	—	April 3, 2008	Kitt Peak	Spacewatch	·	1.4 km	MPC · JPL
811261	2022 NK_{3}	—	July 6, 2022	Haleakala	Pan-STARRS 2	·	1.2 km	MPC · JPL
811262	2022 NR_{5}	—	September 9, 2008	Mount Lemmon	Mount Lemmon Survey	·	1.5 km	MPC · JPL
811263	2022 NX_{11}	—	January 22, 2015	Haleakala	Pan-STARRS 1	·	1.2 km	MPC · JPL
811264	2022 OA_{11}	—	October 5, 2018	Mount Lemmon	Mount Lemmon Survey	·	1.2 km	MPC · JPL
811265	2022 OO_{12}	—	July 23, 2022	Haleakala	Pan-STARRS 2	·	1.1 km	MPC · JPL
811266	2022 OH_{19}	—	December 10, 2013	Mount Lemmon	Mount Lemmon Survey	NAE	1.8 km	MPC · JPL
811267	2022 OU_{25}	—	April 15, 2021	Haleakala	Pan-STARRS 1	·	1.4 km	MPC · JPL
811268	2022 OJ_{28}	—	July 29, 2022	Haleakala	Pan-STARRS 2	·	2.1 km	MPC · JPL
811269	2022 OO_{28}	—	July 25, 2022	Haleakala	Pan-STARRS 2	L5	6.0 km	MPC · JPL
811270	2022 OZ_{31}	—	December 4, 2010	Mount Lemmon	Mount Lemmon Survey	·	1.1 km	MPC · JPL
811271	2022 OH_{38}	—	December 21, 2014	Haleakala	Pan-STARRS 1	·	1.5 km	MPC · JPL
811272	2022 OP_{38}	—	April 6, 2021	Mount Lemmon	Mount Lemmon Survey	MAR	640 m	MPC · JPL
811273	2022 OM_{73}	—	August 8, 2018	Haleakala	Pan-STARRS 1	·	730 m	MPC · JPL
811274	2022 PW_{7}	—	August 1, 2022	Haleakala	Pan-STARRS 2	ELF	2.2 km	MPC · JPL
811275	2022 PY_{8}	—	August 8, 2022	Haleakala	Pan-STARRS 2	·	1.7 km	MPC · JPL
811276	2022 PF_{12}	—	August 2, 2022	Haleakala	Pan-STARRS 2	EOS	1.3 km	MPC · JPL
811277	2022 PR_{13}	—	November 25, 2005	Mount Lemmon	Mount Lemmon Survey	WIT	620 m	MPC · JPL
811278	2022 PG_{14}	—	October 10, 2012	Mount Lemmon	Mount Lemmon Survey	·	1.8 km	MPC · JPL
811279	2022 PB_{19}	—	August 5, 2022	Cerro Tololo-DECam	DECam	KOR	850 m	MPC · JPL
811280	2022 PU_{20}	—	August 1, 2022	Haleakala	Pan-STARRS 2	·	2.2 km	MPC · JPL
811281	2022 PS_{26}	—	August 8, 2022	Haleakala	Pan-STARRS 2	·	3.3 km	MPC · JPL
811282	2022 PO_{33}	—	August 5, 2022	Haleakala	Pan-STARRS 2	·	2.3 km	MPC · JPL
811283	2022 PV_{39}	—	February 22, 2014	Mount Lemmon	Mount Lemmon Survey	·	2.2 km	MPC · JPL
811284	2022 PD_{41}	—	August 5, 2022	Haleakala	Pan-STARRS 2	EOS · critical	1.3 km	MPC · JPL
811285	2022 PT_{41}	—	October 3, 2013	Mount Lemmon	Mount Lemmon Survey	KOR	820 m	MPC · JPL
811286	2022 QZ_{8}	—	May 20, 2015	Cerro Tololo	DECam	·	1.8 km	MPC · JPL
811287	2022 QJ_{9}	—	August 11, 2018	Haleakala	Pan-STARRS 1	·	970 m	MPC · JPL
811288	2022 QL_{10}	—	August 17, 2012	Haleakala	Pan-STARRS 1	KOR	1.0 km	MPC · JPL
811289	2022 QO_{13}	—	September 10, 2018	Mount Lemmon	Mount Lemmon Survey	·	1.0 km	MPC · JPL
811290	2022 QZ_{13}	—	March 1, 2008	Kitt Peak	Spacewatch	·	990 m	MPC · JPL
811291	2022 QJ_{16}	—	April 17, 2021	Haleakala	Pan-STARRS 1	(12739)	1.1 km	MPC · JPL
811292	2022 QK_{19}	—	January 28, 2014	Mount Lemmon	Mount Lemmon Survey	·	2.3 km	MPC · JPL
811293	2022 QR_{20}	—	August 18, 2022	Haleakala	Pan-STARRS 1	·	2.0 km	MPC · JPL
811294	2022 QG_{21}	—	December 15, 2018	Haleakala	Pan-STARRS 1	·	2.0 km	MPC · JPL
811295	2022 QV_{23}	—	February 12, 2011	Mount Lemmon	Mount Lemmon Survey	·	1.3 km	MPC · JPL
811296	2022 QK_{24}	—	August 19, 2022	Haleakala	Pan-STARRS 1	·	1.8 km	MPC · JPL
811297	2022 QN_{28}	—	October 16, 2018	Haleakala	Pan-STARRS 2	·	1.3 km	MPC · JPL
811298	2022 QD_{32}	—	February 1, 2016	Haleakala	Pan-STARRS 1	EUN	930 m	MPC · JPL
811299	2022 QL_{32}	—	March 18, 2021	Haleakala	Pan-STARRS 1	·	1.1 km	MPC · JPL
811300	2022 QO_{38}	—	August 18, 2022	Haleakala	Pan-STARRS 1	·	2.6 km	MPC · JPL

== 811301–811400 ==
back to top

Designation			Discovery			Properties		Ref
Permanent	Provisional	Named after	Date	Site	Discoverer(s)	Category	Diam.	Ref
811301	2022 QH_{46}	—	January 2, 2016	Mount Lemmon	Mount Lemmon Survey	·	970 m	MPC · JPL
811302	2022 QE_{47}	—	February 23, 2015	Haleakala	Pan-STARRS 1	·	1.2 km	MPC · JPL
811303	2022 QK_{49}	—	July 16, 2013	Haleakala	Pan-STARRS 1	·	1.2 km	MPC · JPL
811304	2022 QS_{54}	—	May 21, 2015	Haleakala	Pan-STARRS 1	·	1.9 km	MPC · JPL
811305	2022 QZ_{55}	—	September 25, 2012	Mount Lemmon	Mount Lemmon Survey	EOS	1.1 km	MPC · JPL
811306	2022 QP_{56}	—	January 19, 2020	Haleakala	Pan-STARRS 1	·	1.1 km	MPC · JPL
811307	2022 QX_{60}	—	August 19, 2022	Haleakala	Pan-STARRS 1	KOR	910 m	MPC · JPL
811308	2022 QC_{62}	—	October 17, 2012	Mount Lemmon	Mount Lemmon Survey	·	1.6 km	MPC · JPL
811309	2022 QS_{62}	—	November 1, 2018	Mount Lemmon	Mount Lemmon Survey	·	1.2 km	MPC · JPL
811310	2022 QX_{64}	—	March 5, 2020	Mount Lemmon	Mount Lemmon Survey	·	1.3 km	MPC · JPL
811311	2022 QX_{71}	—	September 18, 2014	Haleakala	Pan-STARRS 1	EUN	720 m	MPC · JPL
811312	2022 QM_{78}	—	January 21, 2015	Haleakala	Pan-STARRS 1	KOR	1.1 km	MPC · JPL
811313	2022 QQ_{78}	—	January 17, 2015	Mount Lemmon	Mount Lemmon Survey	·	1.5 km	MPC · JPL
811314	2022 QM_{80}	—	October 24, 2014	Kitt Peak	Spacewatch	(5)	910 m	MPC · JPL
811315	2022 QZ_{81}	—	September 10, 2018	Mount Lemmon	Mount Lemmon Survey	·	940 m	MPC · JPL
811316	2022 QM_{84}	—	November 2, 2018	Haleakala	Pan-STARRS 2	·	1.0 km	MPC · JPL
811317	2022 QQ_{92}	—	April 22, 2020	Haleakala	Pan-STARRS 1	·	1.6 km	MPC · JPL
811318	2022 QO_{97}	—	August 25, 2022	Haleakala	Pan-STARRS 1	·	1.6 km	MPC · JPL
811319	2022 QB_{98}	—	February 11, 2016	Haleakala	Pan-STARRS 1	·	1.1 km	MPC · JPL
811320	2022 QM_{101}	—	July 5, 2016	Haleakala	Pan-STARRS 1	·	2.1 km	MPC · JPL
811321	2022 QB_{112}	—	April 3, 2019	Haleakala	Pan-STARRS 1	·	2.2 km	MPC · JPL
811322	2022 QS_{114}	—	October 22, 2017	Mount Lemmon	Mount Lemmon Survey	·	1.4 km	MPC · JPL
811323	2022 QA_{116}	—	September 6, 2008	Mount Lemmon	Mount Lemmon Survey	HOF	1.6 km	MPC · JPL
811324	2022 QR_{116}	—	March 5, 2020	Mount Lemmon	Mount Lemmon Survey	EOS	1.4 km	MPC · JPL
811325	2022 QS_{119}	—	August 31, 2022	Haleakala	Pan-STARRS 1	WIT	680 m	MPC · JPL
811326	2022 QX_{123}	—	August 28, 2022	Haleakala	Pan-STARRS 2	·	1.1 km	MPC · JPL
811327	2022 QH_{127}	—	January 18, 2013	Mount Lemmon	Mount Lemmon Survey	·	2.5 km	MPC · JPL
811328	2022 QJ_{127}	—	January 17, 2015	Haleakala	Pan-STARRS 1	·	1.6 km	MPC · JPL
811329	2022 QM_{128}	—	September 13, 2013	Mount Lemmon	Mount Lemmon Survey	AEO	840 m	MPC · JPL
811330	2022 QA_{134}	—	August 25, 2022	Haleakala	Pan-STARRS 1	·	2.2 km	MPC · JPL
811331	2022 QJ_{138}	—	August 29, 2022	Haleakala	Pan-STARRS 2	VER	2.0 km	MPC · JPL
811332	2022 QK_{138}	—	August 25, 2022	Haleakala	Pan-STARRS 2	·	1.5 km	MPC · JPL
811333	2022 QU_{141}	—	December 20, 2017	Mount Lemmon	Mount Lemmon Survey	·	2.1 km	MPC · JPL
811334	2022 QH_{142}	—	December 21, 2014	Haleakala	Pan-STARRS 1	·	1.2 km	MPC · JPL
811335	2022 QD_{154}	—	August 31, 2022	Haleakala	Pan-STARRS 1	WIT	640 m	MPC · JPL
811336	2022 QJ_{164}	—	August 31, 2022	Haleakala	Pan-STARRS 1	615	1.0 km	MPC · JPL
811337	2022 QX_{173}	—	April 19, 2020	Haleakala	Pan-STARRS 1	·	1.4 km	MPC · JPL
811338	2022 QQ_{177}	—	July 25, 2017	Haleakala	Pan-STARRS 1	·	1.4 km	MPC · JPL
811339	2022 QG_{178}	—	September 13, 2017	Haleakala	Pan-STARRS 1	EOS	1.4 km	MPC · JPL
811340	2022 QM_{180}	—	September 17, 2017	Haleakala	Pan-STARRS 1	·	2.0 km	MPC · JPL
811341	2022 QE_{190}	—	November 2, 2013	Mount Lemmon	Mount Lemmon Survey	·	1.6 km	MPC · JPL
811342	2022 QM_{193}	—	February 10, 2015	Mount Lemmon	Mount Lemmon Survey	·	1.6 km	MPC · JPL
811343	2022 QK_{195}	—	August 29, 2016	Mount Lemmon	Mount Lemmon Survey	·	2.1 km	MPC · JPL
811344	2022 QW_{195}	—	January 23, 2020	Mount Lemmon	Mount Lemmon Survey	·	2.7 km	MPC · JPL
811345	2022 QP_{203}	—	January 27, 2007	Kitt Peak	Spacewatch	·	2.1 km	MPC · JPL
811346	2022 QL_{210}	—	September 26, 2003	Sacramento Peak	SDSS	·	1.5 km	MPC · JPL
811347	2022 QW_{210}	—	April 30, 2016	Haleakala	Pan-STARRS 1	PAD	1.1 km	MPC · JPL
811348	2022 QY_{213}	—	April 10, 2015	Haleakala	Pan-STARRS 1	EOS	1.3 km	MPC · JPL
811349	2022 QT_{261}	—	August 18, 2022	Haleakala	Pan-STARRS 1	·	2.1 km	MPC · JPL
811350	2022 QX_{269}	—	November 9, 2018	Mount Lemmon	Mount Lemmon Survey	·	1.4 km	MPC · JPL
811351	2022 QV_{291}	—	May 20, 2015	Cerro Tololo	DECam	·	2.1 km	MPC · JPL
811352	2022 RO_{15}	—	September 2, 2022	Haleakala	Pan-STARRS 2	EOS	1.2 km	MPC · JPL
811353	2022 RB_{16}	—	October 4, 2013	Mount Lemmon	Mount Lemmon Survey	·	1.4 km	MPC · JPL
811354	2022 RS_{22}	—	November 25, 2019	Haleakala	Pan-STARRS 1	·	1.2 km	MPC · JPL
811355	2022 RQ_{23}	—	August 17, 2017	Haleakala	Pan-STARRS 1	·	1.3 km	MPC · JPL
811356	2022 RE_{27}	—	November 9, 2018	Haleakala	Pan-STARRS 2	KOR	1.0 km	MPC · JPL
811357	2022 RA_{30}	—	February 5, 2019	Haleakala	Pan-STARRS 1	·	2.5 km	MPC · JPL
811358	2022 RB_{30}	—	November 28, 2013	Mount Lemmon	Mount Lemmon Survey	KOR	1.1 km	MPC · JPL
811359	2022 RJ_{31}	—	September 17, 2006	Kitt Peak	Spacewatch	·	1.8 km	MPC · JPL
811360	2022 RH_{37}	—	November 10, 2009	Kitt Peak	Spacewatch	·	1.3 km	MPC · JPL
811361	2022 RL_{37}	—	January 10, 2013	Haleakala	Pan-STARRS 1	·	2.2 km	MPC · JPL
811362	2022 RS_{60}	—	April 19, 2020	Haleakala	Pan-STARRS 1	·	1.5 km	MPC · JPL
811363	2022 RG_{65}	—	April 23, 2014	Cerro Tololo	DECam	VER	1.8 km	MPC · JPL
811364	2022 RL_{66}	—	October 9, 2008	Mount Lemmon	Mount Lemmon Survey	·	1.4 km	MPC · JPL
811365	2022 RY_{70}	—	December 22, 2012	Haleakala	Pan-STARRS 1	·	2.1 km	MPC · JPL
811366	2022 RT_{71}	—	May 1, 2016	Haleakala	Pan-STARRS 1	·	1.8 km	MPC · JPL
811367	2022 RN_{77}	—	September 2, 2022	Haleakala	Pan-STARRS 1	ADE	1.5 km	MPC · JPL
811368	2022 RR_{82}	—	September 1, 2022	Haleakala	Pan-STARRS 1	KOR	990 m	MPC · JPL
811369	2022 RA_{89}	—	September 1, 2022	Haleakala	Pan-STARRS 2	URS	2.3 km	MPC · JPL
811370	2022 SB_{3}	—	September 24, 2004	Kitt Peak	Spacewatch	PAD	1.2 km	MPC · JPL
811371	2022 ST_{13}	—	November 8, 2013	Mount Lemmon	Mount Lemmon Survey	·	1.6 km	MPC · JPL
811372	2022 SA_{14}	—	January 24, 2014	Haleakala	Pan-STARRS 1	·	1.6 km	MPC · JPL
811373	2022 SB_{17}	—	July 26, 2017	Haleakala	Pan-STARRS 1	·	1.3 km	MPC · JPL
811374	2022 SE_{18}	—	March 14, 2011	Mount Lemmon	Mount Lemmon Survey	·	1.4 km	MPC · JPL
811375	2022 ST_{27}	—	October 26, 2013	Mount Lemmon	Mount Lemmon Survey	·	1.3 km	MPC · JPL
811376	2022 ST_{35}	—	July 25, 2017	Haleakala	Pan-STARRS 1	·	1.2 km	MPC · JPL
811377	2022 SM_{36}	—	September 21, 2017	Haleakala	Pan-STARRS 1	·	1.6 km	MPC · JPL
811378	2022 SN_{43}	—	September 17, 2017	Haleakala	Pan-STARRS 1	KOR	1.0 km	MPC · JPL
811379	2022 SE_{46}	—	August 8, 2012	Haleakala	Pan-STARRS 1	·	1.7 km	MPC · JPL
811380	2022 SH_{50}	—	September 23, 2022	Haleakala	Pan-STARRS 1	·	1.4 km	MPC · JPL
811381	2022 SV_{50}	—	April 20, 2012	Mount Lemmon	Mount Lemmon Survey	(5)	1.1 km	MPC · JPL
811382	2022 SY_{55}	—	September 20, 2022	Haleakala	Pan-STARRS 1	·	1.9 km	MPC · JPL
811383	2022 SG_{56}	—	February 5, 2019	Haleakala	Pan-STARRS 1	·	1.3 km	MPC · JPL
811384	2022 SE_{57}	—	October 27, 2009	Mount Lemmon	Mount Lemmon Survey	·	900 m	MPC · JPL
811385	2022 SO_{57}	—	March 16, 2020	Mount Lemmon	Mount Lemmon Survey	(31811)	2.0 km	MPC · JPL
811386	2022 SU_{61}	—	September 27, 2017	Mount Lemmon	Mount Lemmon Survey	·	1.4 km	MPC · JPL
811387	2022 SL_{65}	—	October 15, 2017	Mount Lemmon	Mount Lemmon Survey	·	1.4 km	MPC · JPL
811388	2022 SZ_{67}	—	November 3, 2007	Mount Lemmon	Mount Lemmon Survey	·	1.5 km	MPC · JPL
811389	2022 SJ_{70}	—	February 19, 2009	Mount Lemmon	Mount Lemmon Survey	EOS	1.1 km	MPC · JPL
811390	2022 SY_{72}	—	December 21, 2014	Haleakala	Pan-STARRS 1	NEM	1.5 km	MPC · JPL
811391	2022 SB_{76}	—	October 26, 2011	Haleakala	Pan-STARRS 1	HYG	1.9 km	MPC · JPL
811392	2022 SN_{77}	—	September 24, 2022	Haleakala	Pan-STARRS 1	·	2.2 km	MPC · JPL
811393	2022 SL_{78}	—	November 6, 2018	Haleakala	Pan-STARRS 2	·	1.2 km	MPC · JPL
811394	2022 SN_{79}	—	March 11, 2016	Mount Lemmon	Mount Lemmon Survey	(5)	890 m	MPC · JPL
811395	2022 SS_{79}	—	April 29, 2014	Cerro Tololo	DECam	·	2.2 km	MPC · JPL
811396	2022 SK_{82}	—	December 21, 2006	Kitt Peak	L. H. Wasserman, M. W. Buie	·	2.2 km	MPC · JPL
811397	2022 SW_{87}	—	September 17, 2022	Haleakala	Pan-STARRS 1	·	1.2 km	MPC · JPL
811398	2022 SE_{89}	—	July 9, 2021	Haleakala	Pan-STARRS 1	·	1.9 km	MPC · JPL
811399	2022 SJ_{90}	—	May 3, 2016	Haleakala	Pan-STARRS 1	·	1.3 km	MPC · JPL
811400	2022 SN_{96}	—	October 24, 2011	Haleakala	Pan-STARRS 1	·	2.2 km	MPC · JPL

== 811401–811500 ==
back to top

Designation			Discovery			Properties		Ref
Permanent	Provisional	Named after	Date	Site	Discoverer(s)	Category	Diam.	Ref
811401	2022 SL_{99}	—	November 13, 2012	Mount Lemmon	Mount Lemmon Survey	·	1.1 km	MPC · JPL
811402	2022 SG_{108}	—	July 16, 2013	Haleakala	Pan-STARRS 1	·	1.2 km	MPC · JPL
811403	2022 SW_{108}	—	October 12, 2013	Kitt Peak	Spacewatch	·	1.5 km	MPC · JPL
811404	2022 SP_{110}	—	September 23, 2022	Haleakala	Pan-STARRS 2	EOS	1.2 km	MPC · JPL
811405	2022 SV_{111}	—	December 26, 2014	Haleakala	Pan-STARRS 1	WIT	660 m	MPC · JPL
811406	2022 SN_{116}	—	April 23, 2014	Cerro Tololo	DECam	·	2.2 km	MPC · JPL
811407	2022 SO_{116}	—	September 19, 2022	Haleakala	Pan-STARRS 2	·	2.6 km	MPC · JPL
811408	2022 SN_{125}	—	October 7, 2008	Mount Lemmon	Mount Lemmon Survey	·	1.6 km	MPC · JPL
811409	2022 ST_{125}	—	September 3, 2010	Mount Lemmon	Mount Lemmon Survey	·	2.1 km	MPC · JPL
811410	2022 SG_{129}	—	November 21, 2017	Haleakala	Pan-STARRS 1	·	2.4 km	MPC · JPL
811411	2022 SA_{130}	—	August 13, 2012	Haleakala	Pan-STARRS 1	GEF	970 m	MPC · JPL
811412	2022 SO_{132}	—	November 27, 2013	Haleakala	Pan-STARRS 1	HOF	2.0 km	MPC · JPL
811413	2022 SP_{133}	—	October 16, 2009	Mount Lemmon	Mount Lemmon Survey	·	980 m	MPC · JPL
811414	2022 SR_{134}	—	September 26, 2022	Haleakala	Pan-STARRS 1	·	1.4 km	MPC · JPL
811415	2022 SH_{142}	—	September 23, 2022	Haleakala	Pan-STARRS 1	·	980 m	MPC · JPL
811416	2022 SD_{145}	—	October 22, 2011	Mount Lemmon	Mount Lemmon Survey	·	1.9 km	MPC · JPL
811417	2022 SO_{145}	—	September 25, 2022	Haleakala	Pan-STARRS 1	·	1.7 km	MPC · JPL
811418	2022 SP_{145}	—	January 23, 2018	Mount Lemmon	Mount Lemmon Survey	·	2.6 km	MPC · JPL
811419	2022 SV_{145}	—	December 22, 2012	Haleakala	Pan-STARRS 1	EOS	1.4 km	MPC · JPL
811420	2022 SZ_{145}	—	September 25, 2022	Mount Lemmon	Mount Lemmon Survey	·	1.7 km	MPC · JPL
811421	2022 SC_{146}	—	September 25, 2022	Haleakala	Pan-STARRS 1	·	2.0 km	MPC · JPL
811422	2022 SZ_{153}	—	September 6, 2016	Mount Lemmon	Mount Lemmon Survey	·	2.0 km	MPC · JPL
811423	2022 SL_{164}	—	September 17, 2006	Kitt Peak	Spacewatch	·	1.7 km	MPC · JPL
811424	2022 SQ_{164}	—	September 17, 2010	Mount Lemmon	Mount Lemmon Survey	·	2.4 km	MPC · JPL
811425	2022 SQ_{177}	—	December 23, 2012	Haleakala	Pan-STARRS 1	·	1.6 km	MPC · JPL
811426	2022 SH_{178}	—	September 19, 2022	Haleakala	Pan-STARRS 2	·	2.4 km	MPC · JPL
811427	2022 SH_{180}	—	August 14, 2016	Haleakala	Pan-STARRS 1	·	1.9 km	MPC · JPL
811428	2022 SN_{181}	—	April 24, 2014	Cerro Tololo	DECam	·	2.1 km	MPC · JPL
811429	2022 SU_{194}	—	April 5, 2014	Haleakala	Pan-STARRS 1	·	2.1 km	MPC · JPL
811430	2022 SN_{207}	—	February 16, 2020	Calar Alto-Schmidt	E. Schwab, Koschny, D.	·	1.5 km	MPC · JPL
811431	2022 SX_{230}	—	January 8, 2019	Haleakala	Pan-STARRS 1	EOS	1.2 km	MPC · JPL
811432	2022 SN_{242}	—	February 16, 2015	Haleakala	Pan-STARRS 1	·	1.3 km	MPC · JPL
811433	2022 SB_{243}	—	September 28, 2022	Haleakala	Pan-STARRS 1	·	1.9 km	MPC · JPL
811434	2022 SR_{244}	—	September 26, 2017	Haleakala	Pan-STARRS 1	·	1.3 km	MPC · JPL
811435	2022 SJ_{246}	—	October 24, 2011	Haleakala	Pan-STARRS 1	·	2.1 km	MPC · JPL
811436	2022 SL_{266}	—	September 27, 2022	Haleakala	Pan-STARRS 2	·	1.5 km	MPC · JPL
811437	2022 SJ_{289}	—	April 24, 2014	Mount Lemmon	Mount Lemmon Survey	·	2.2 km	MPC · JPL
811438	2022 SX_{297}	—	April 29, 2014	Cerro Tololo	DECam	·	1.9 km	MPC · JPL
811439	2022 SW_{303}	—	September 19, 2022	Haleakala	Pan-STARRS 1	·	1.6 km	MPC · JPL
811440	2022 SC_{314}	—	October 28, 2014	Mount Lemmon	Mount Lemmon Survey	·	1 km	MPC · JPL
811441	2022 TC_{3}	—	December 22, 2012	Haleakala	Pan-STARRS 1	·	2.3 km	MPC · JPL
811442	2022 TU_{6}	—	September 15, 2017	Haleakala	Pan-STARRS 1	·	1.4 km	MPC · JPL
811443	2022 TZ_{9}	—	November 17, 2011	Mount Lemmon	Mount Lemmon Survey	·	2.0 km	MPC · JPL
811444	2022 TA_{10}	—	October 2, 2022	Haleakala	Pan-STARRS 2	·	2.1 km	MPC · JPL
811445	2022 TA_{22}	—	October 23, 2011	Mount Lemmon	Mount Lemmon Survey	·	1.9 km	MPC · JPL
811446	2022 TK_{32}	—	December 26, 2014	Haleakala	Pan-STARRS 1	·	1.2 km	MPC · JPL
811447	2022 TL_{33}	—	January 19, 2015	Mount Lemmon	Mount Lemmon Survey	·	1.2 km	MPC · JPL
811448	2022 TW_{33}	—	October 6, 2022	Haleakala	Pan-STARRS 2	·	2.6 km	MPC · JPL
811449	2022 TT_{36}	—	April 29, 2014	Haleakala	Pan-STARRS 1	·	2.2 km	MPC · JPL
811450	2022 UC_{12}	—	October 17, 2022	Mount Lemmon	Mount Lemmon Survey	·	1.5 km	MPC · JPL
811451	2022 UK_{20}	—	April 5, 2008	Kitt Peak	Spacewatch	VER	2.0 km	MPC · JPL
811452	2022 US_{23}	—	January 20, 2015	Haleakala	Pan-STARRS 1	·	1.1 km	MPC · JPL
811453	2022 UF_{53}	—	October 2, 2016	Mount Lemmon	Mount Lemmon Survey	·	2.2 km	MPC · JPL
811454	2022 UQ_{60}	—	November 4, 2005	Kitt Peak	Spacewatch	·	2.0 km	MPC · JPL
811455	2022 UA_{65}	—	June 25, 2017	Haleakala	Pan-STARRS 1	·	1.2 km	MPC · JPL
811456	2022 UC_{69}	—	September 24, 2008	Kitt Peak	Spacewatch	HOF	2.0 km	MPC · JPL
811457	2022 UQ_{72}	—	October 26, 2022	Mount Lemmon	Mount Lemmon Survey	EOS	1.4 km	MPC · JPL
811458	2022 UA_{84}	—	October 23, 2022	Haleakala	Pan-STARRS 2	EOS	1.3 km	MPC · JPL
811459	2022 UC_{99}	—	August 9, 2021	Haleakala	Pan-STARRS 1	·	2.1 km	MPC · JPL
811460	2022 UN_{103}	—	October 19, 2022	Haleakala	Pan-STARRS 2	·	1.6 km	MPC · JPL
811461	2022 UP_{107}	—	April 19, 2020	Haleakala	Pan-STARRS 1	KOR	950 m	MPC · JPL
811462	2022 UC_{109}	—	December 2, 2005	Mount Lemmon	Mount Lemmon Survey	·	2.3 km	MPC · JPL
811463	2022 UO_{112}	—	October 24, 2022	Haleakala	Pan-STARRS 2	·	1.9 km	MPC · JPL
811464	2022 US_{114}	—	November 10, 2005	Kitt Peak	Spacewatch	URS	2.2 km	MPC · JPL
811465	2022 UW_{142}	—	October 20, 2022	Haleakala	Pan-STARRS 1	L4	5.3 km	MPC · JPL
811466	2022 UA_{149}	—	September 25, 2016	Haleakala	Pan-STARRS 1	·	2.3 km	MPC · JPL
811467	2022 WM_{5}	—	November 16, 2022	Haleakala	Pan-STARRS 2	L4	5.9 km	MPC · JPL
811468	2022 WP_{14}	—	May 24, 2014	Haleakala	Pan-STARRS 1	·	2.5 km	MPC · JPL
811469	2022 WV_{16}	—	November 16, 2022	Haleakala	Pan-STARRS 2	ELF	2.3 km	MPC · JPL
811470	2022 WE_{33}	—	November 16, 2022	Haleakala	Pan-STARRS 1	·	2.1 km	MPC · JPL
811471	2022 WT_{39}	—	November 16, 2022	Haleakala	Pan-STARRS 2	L4	5.7 km	MPC · JPL
811472	2023 FD_{9}	—	September 26, 2016	Haleakala	Pan-STARRS 1	·	1.3 km	MPC · JPL
811473	2023 FT_{16}	—	February 28, 2012	Haleakala	Pan-STARRS 1	·	1.5 km	MPC · JPL
811474	2023 GA_{6}	—	April 15, 2023	Kitt Peak	Bok NEO Survey	·	1.5 km	MPC · JPL
811475	2023 GL_{6}	—	April 14, 2023	Kitt Peak	Bok NEO Survey	·	800 m	MPC · JPL
811476	2023 HX_{3}	—	May 21, 2014	Haleakala	Pan-STARRS 1	·	1.5 km	MPC · JPL
811477 Juravle	2023 HY_{14}	Juravle	November 1, 2014	Roque de los Muchachos	EURONEAR	·	1.7 km	MPC · JPL
811478	2023 HR_{26}	—	April 25, 2023	Haleakala	Pan-STARRS 2	·	1.1 km	MPC · JPL
811479	2023 JW_{6}	—	November 17, 2020	Mount Lemmon	Mount Lemmon Survey	·	1.2 km	MPC · JPL
811480	2023 JM_{9}	—	October 26, 2011	Haleakala	Pan-STARRS 1	WIT	720 m	MPC · JPL
811481	2023 JN_{17}	—	January 17, 2013	Haleakala	Pan-STARRS 1	·	1.2 km	MPC · JPL
811482	2023 JA_{25}	—	September 7, 2018	Mount Lemmon	Mount Lemmon Survey	·	1.6 km	MPC · JPL
811483	2023 LY_{2}	—	June 12, 2023	Haleakala	Pan-STARRS 1	·	1.1 km	MPC · JPL
811484	2023 MC_{13}	—	October 5, 2018	Haleakala	Pan-STARRS 2	·	2.2 km	MPC · JPL
811485	2023 OF_{8}	—	July 20, 2001	Palomar Mountain	NEAT	·	2.4 km	MPC · JPL
811486	2023 OP_{9}	—	November 22, 2014	Mount Lemmon	Mount Lemmon Survey	L5	6.3 km	MPC · JPL
811487	2023 OO_{21}	—	July 27, 2023	Haleakala	Pan-STARRS 2	EOS	1.4 km	MPC · JPL
811488	2023 OR_{27}	—	January 15, 2015	Haleakala	Pan-STARRS 1	·	2.4 km	MPC · JPL
811489	2023 OR_{54}	—	July 16, 2023	Haleakala	Pan-STARRS 1	L5	5.9 km	MPC · JPL
811490	2023 QJ_{11}	—	September 29, 2010	Mount Lemmon	Mount Lemmon Survey	·	1.2 km	MPC · JPL
811491	2023 QD_{19}	—	January 20, 2015	Mount Lemmon	Mount Lemmon Survey	·	2.1 km	MPC · JPL
811492	2023 QC_{20}	—	September 22, 2012	Kitt Peak	Spacewatch	·	1.9 km	MPC · JPL
811493	2023 QE_{29}	—	August 20, 2023	Haleakala	Pan-STARRS 1	T_{j} (2.91)	2.7 km	MPC · JPL
811494	2023 QG_{29}	—	August 20, 2023	Haleakala	Pan-STARRS 1	·	1.5 km	MPC · JPL
811495	2023 QQ_{44}	—	September 19, 2014	Haleakala	Pan-STARRS 1	·	1.5 km	MPC · JPL
811496	2023 QD_{121}	—	March 8, 2008	Mount Lemmon	Mount Lemmon Survey	·	1.1 km	MPC · JPL
811497	2023 RK_{19}	—	January 28, 2015	Haleakala	Pan-STARRS 1	·	2.4 km	MPC · JPL
811498	2023 RB_{28}	—	September 7, 2023	Haleakala	Pan-STARRS 2	·	1.4 km	MPC · JPL
811499	2023 RL_{38}	—	November 1, 2008	Kitt Peak	Spacewatch	·	1.3 km	MPC · JPL
811500	2023 RF_{67}	—	November 4, 2019	Mount Lemmon	Mount Lemmon Survey	·	900 m	MPC · JPL

== 811501–811600 ==
back to top

Designation			Discovery			Properties		Ref
Permanent	Provisional	Named after	Date	Site	Discoverer(s)	Category	Diam.	Ref
811501	2023 RC_{69}	—	April 11, 2021	Haleakala	Pan-STARRS 1	·	1.2 km	MPC · JPL
811502	2023 RR_{95}	—	January 23, 2020	Haleakala	Pan-STARRS 1	EOS	1.3 km	MPC · JPL
811503	2023 RR_{165}	—	August 5, 2018	Haleakala	Pan-STARRS 1	·	1.0 km	MPC · JPL
811504	2023 RO_{169}	—	July 28, 2022	Haleakala	Pan-STARRS 2	L5	6.2 km	MPC · JPL
811505	2023 SP_{13}	—	March 22, 2015	Haleakala	Pan-STARRS 1	critical	1.8 km	MPC · JPL
811506	2023 SL_{28}	—	June 17, 2012	Mount Lemmon	Mount Lemmon Survey	·	1.4 km	MPC · JPL
811507	2023 SP_{49}	—	January 11, 2015	Haleakala	Pan-STARRS 1	·	1.2 km	MPC · JPL
811508	2023 SB_{66}	—	August 13, 2018	Haleakala	Pan-STARRS 1	·	1.3 km	MPC · JPL
811509	2023 SJ_{68}	—	December 26, 2014	Haleakala	Pan-STARRS 1	·	1.3 km	MPC · JPL
811510	2023 TD_{16}	—	December 3, 2007	Kitt Peak	Spacewatch	·	2.0 km	MPC · JPL
811511	2023 TP_{20}	—	December 29, 2014	Haleakala	Pan-STARRS 1	·	1.3 km	MPC · JPL
811512	2023 TZ_{34}	—	December 9, 2018	Mount Lemmon	Mount Lemmon Survey	·	2.0 km	MPC · JPL
811513	2023 TS_{37}	—	October 10, 2023	Haleakala	Pan-STARRS 1	AGN	800 m	MPC · JPL
811514	2023 TW_{61}	—	January 23, 2020	Haleakala	Pan-STARRS 1	VER	2.1 km	MPC · JPL
811515	2023 TF_{86}	—	October 12, 2023	Haleakala	Pan-STARRS 2	·	1.2 km	MPC · JPL
811516	2023 TB_{88}	—	March 28, 2016	Mount Lemmon	Mount Lemmon Survey	·	1.2 km	MPC · JPL
811517	2023 TW_{95}	—	January 13, 2016	Kitt Peak	Spacewatch	(5)	850 m	MPC · JPL
811518	2023 TR_{101}	—	November 22, 2014	Haleakala	Pan-STARRS 1	·	1.3 km	MPC · JPL
811519	2023 TN_{132}	—	October 14, 2023	Haleakala	Pan-STARRS 1	·	2.0 km	MPC · JPL
811520	2023 TN_{142}	—	October 15, 2023	Haleakala	Pan-STARRS 1	·	2.1 km	MPC · JPL
811521	2023 TG_{184}	—	January 30, 2011	Mount Lemmon	Mount Lemmon Survey	HOF	1.4 km	MPC · JPL
811522	2023 TY_{186}	—	April 16, 2007	Mount Lemmon	Mount Lemmon Survey	·	1.4 km	MPC · JPL
811523	2023 TK_{198}	—	October 5, 2023	Haleakala	Pan-STARRS 2	·	1.7 km	MPC · JPL
811524	2023 UN_{5}	—	October 14, 2010	Catalina	CSS	·	1.3 km	MPC · JPL
811525	2023 UV_{5}	—	February 5, 2016	Haleakala	Pan-STARRS 1	·	1.3 km	MPC · JPL
811526	2023 UY_{9}	—	October 5, 2021	Haleakala	Pan-STARRS 1	L4	5.3 km	MPC · JPL
811527	2023 UB_{13}	—	October 17, 2023	Haleakala	Pan-STARRS 1	·	1.9 km	MPC · JPL
811528	2023 UE_{13}	—	October 17, 2023	Haleakala	Pan-STARRS 1	·	2.0 km	MPC · JPL
811529 Kiszelymárta	2023 UV_{14}	Kiszelymárta	October 14, 2023	GINOP-KHK, Piszkes	T. Maróti, N. O. Szabó	·	1.7 km	MPC · JPL
811530	2023 UF_{23}	—	March 27, 2012	Mount Lemmon	Mount Lemmon Survey	·	900 m	MPC · JPL
811531	2023 UK_{31}	—	October 26, 2023	Haleakala	Pan-STARRS 1	·	880 m	MPC · JPL
811532	2023 UD_{50}	—	February 12, 2015	Haleakala	Pan-STARRS 1	·	1.4 km	MPC · JPL
811533	2023 UN_{90}	—	March 10, 2016	Mount Lemmon	Mount Lemmon Survey	·	1.3 km	MPC · JPL
811534	2023 VD_{14}	—	February 25, 2012	Mount Lemmon	Mount Lemmon Survey	·	900 m	MPC · JPL
811535	2023 VB_{19}	—	November 8, 2023	Haleakala	Pan-STARRS 1	·	1.8 km	MPC · JPL
811536	2023 VW_{46}	—	November 13, 2017	Haleakala	Pan-STARRS 1	·	1.8 km	MPC · JPL
811537	2023 WH_{7}	—	February 29, 2016	Haleakala	Pan-STARRS 1	·	1.1 km	MPC · JPL
811538	2023 WO_{9}	—	October 17, 2017	Mount Lemmon	Mount Lemmon Survey	LIX	2.4 km	MPC · JPL
811539	2023 WA_{21}	—	April 23, 2015	Haleakala	Pan-STARRS 1	·	1.8 km	MPC · JPL
811540 Ernstsalpeter	2023 WA_{29}	Ernstsalpeter	November 18, 2014	Mount Graham	K. Černis, Boyle, R. P.	·	1.4 km	MPC · JPL
811541	2023 XV_{3}	—	October 5, 2013	Haleakala	Pan-STARRS 1	KOR	850 m	MPC · JPL
811542	2023 XT_{15}	—	January 16, 2015	Haleakala	Pan-STARRS 1	DOR	1.5 km	MPC · JPL
811543	2023 YN_{2}	—	August 11, 2018	Haleakala	Pan-STARRS 1	L4	5.9 km	MPC · JPL
811544	2024 AG_{10}	—	January 25, 2011	Mount Lemmon	Mount Lemmon Survey	·	990 m	MPC · JPL
811545	2024 BF_{6}	—	November 13, 2010	Mount Lemmon	Mount Lemmon Survey	L4	4.7 km	MPC · JPL
811546	2024 BZ_{13}	—	June 19, 2015	Haleakala	Pan-STARRS 1	L4	5.3 km	MPC · JPL
811547	2024 BA_{14}	—	November 1, 2021	Haleakala	Pan-STARRS 1	L4 · ERY	5.7 km	MPC · JPL
811548	2024 BH_{30}	—	March 22, 2015	Haleakala	Pan-STARRS 1	L4	5.5 km	MPC · JPL
811549	2024 FH_{23}	—	October 12, 2007	Mount Lemmon	Mount Lemmon Survey	·	1.4 km	MPC · JPL
811550	2024 JK_{6}	—	April 14, 2008	Mount Lemmon	Mount Lemmon Survey	·	1.5 km	MPC · JPL
811551	2024 KE_{7}	—	October 9, 2015	Haleakala	Pan-STARRS 1	·	2.2 km	MPC · JPL
811552	2024 LF_{7}	—	January 31, 2017	Mount Lemmon	Mount Lemmon Survey	·	2.1 km	MPC · JPL
811553	1993 TP_{6}	—	October 9, 1993	Kitt Peak	Spacewatch	·	420 m	MPC · JPL
811554	1994 GB_{2}	—	April 3, 1994	Kitt Peak	Spacewatch	·	810 m	MPC · JPL
811555	1994 GJ_{6}	—	April 6, 1994	Kitt Peak	Spacewatch	·	520 m	MPC · JPL
811556	1994 SX_{6}	—	September 28, 1994	Kitt Peak	Spacewatch	·	450 m	MPC · JPL
811557	1994 TZ_{5}	—	October 4, 1994	Kitt Peak	Spacewatch	3:2	4.3 km	MPC · JPL
811558	1995 MR_{7}	—	June 25, 1995	Kitt Peak	Spacewatch	·	690 m	MPC · JPL
811559	1995 SS_{9}	—	September 17, 1995	Kitt Peak	Spacewatch	·	470 m	MPC · JPL
811560	1995 SU_{36}	—	September 24, 1995	Kitt Peak	Spacewatch	·	1.4 km	MPC · JPL
811561	1995 SY_{50}	—	September 26, 1995	Kitt Peak	Spacewatch	·	1.3 km	MPC · JPL
811562	1995 SN_{59}	—	September 25, 1995	Kitt Peak	Spacewatch	V	440 m	MPC · JPL
811563	1995 SS_{64}	—	September 18, 1995	Kitt Peak	Spacewatch	MAS	480 m	MPC · JPL
811564	1995 SN_{74}	—	September 19, 1995	Kitt Peak	Spacewatch	NYS	570 m	MPC · JPL
811565	1995 SA_{75}	—	September 19, 1995	Kitt Peak	Spacewatch	MAS	430 m	MPC · JPL
811566	1995 SK_{85}	—	September 25, 1995	Kitt Peak	Spacewatch	·	450 m	MPC · JPL
811567	1995 TB_{6}	—	October 15, 1995	Kitt Peak	Spacewatch	·	1.2 km	MPC · JPL
811568	1995 UQ_{74}	—	October 21, 1995	Kitt Peak	Spacewatch	·	520 m	MPC · JPL
811569	1995 UB_{76}	—	October 21, 1995	Kitt Peak	Spacewatch	·	510 m	MPC · JPL
811570	1995 UK_{84}	—	October 28, 1995	Kitt Peak	Spacewatch	·	560 m	MPC · JPL
811571	1995 WU_{15}	—	November 17, 1995	Kitt Peak	Spacewatch	·	630 m	MPC · JPL
811572	1996 BD_{16}	—	January 21, 1996	Kitt Peak	Spacewatch	·	740 m	MPC · JPL
811573	1996 EN_{16}	—	March 12, 1996	Kitt Peak	Spacewatch	·	520 m	MPC · JPL
811574	1996 GO_{12}	—	April 9, 1996	Kitt Peak	Spacewatch	EUN	940 m	MPC · JPL
811575	1996 RJ_{16}	—	September 13, 1996	Kitt Peak	Spacewatch	NYS	890 m	MPC · JPL
811576	1996 RA_{21}	—	September 5, 1996	Kitt Peak	Spacewatch	·	1.2 km	MPC · JPL
811577	1996 TL_{34}	—	October 10, 1996	Kitt Peak	Spacewatch	·	580 m	MPC · JPL
811578	1996 VN_{37}	—	November 11, 1996	Kitt Peak	Spacewatch	·	710 m	MPC · JPL
811579	1996 XH_{9}	—	December 1, 1996	Kitt Peak	Spacewatch	·	1.1 km	MPC · JPL
811580	1996 XT_{12}	—	December 6, 1996	Kitt Peak	Spacewatch	·	1.5 km	MPC · JPL
811581	1996 XE_{18}	—	December 7, 1996	Kitt Peak	Spacewatch	(1547)	1.6 km	MPC · JPL
811582	1997 SX_{5}	—	September 23, 1997	Kitt Peak	Spacewatch	·	540 m	MPC · JPL
811583	1997 ST_{11}	—	September 27, 1997	Kitt Peak	Spacewatch	·	540 m	MPC · JPL
811584	1997 SX_{28}	—	September 29, 1997	Kitt Peak	Spacewatch	JUN	680 m	MPC · JPL
811585	1998 BJ_{28}	—	January 23, 1998	Kitt Peak	Spacewatch	·	1.1 km	MPC · JPL
811586	1998 BT_{38}	—	January 29, 1998	Kitt Peak	Spacewatch	·	940 m	MPC · JPL
811587	1998 DX_{38}	—	February 8, 2008	Mount Lemmon	Mount Lemmon Survey	·	510 m	MPC · JPL
811588	1998 HF_{159}	—	April 25, 2015	Haleakala	Pan-STARRS 1	·	490 m	MPC · JPL
811589	1998 MS	—	June 18, 1998	Kitt Peak	Spacewatch	H	490 m	MPC · JPL
811590	1998 MQ_{4}	—	June 18, 1998	Kitt Peak	Spacewatch	(5)	990 m	MPC · JPL
811591	1998 OL_{4}	—	July 25, 1998	Kitt Peak	Spacewatch	·	1.5 km	MPC · JPL
811592	1998 QK_{112}	—	October 9, 2012	Mount Lemmon	Mount Lemmon Survey	AEO	820 m	MPC · JPL
811593	1998 SJ_{178}	—	August 17, 2013	Haleakala	Pan-STARRS 1	·	1.1 km	MPC · JPL
811594	1998 SS_{180}	—	October 25, 2013	Mount Lemmon	Mount Lemmon Survey	MAS	460 m	MPC · JPL
811595	1998 WW_{46}	—	November 21, 2009	Kitt Peak	Spacewatch	MAS	500 m	MPC · JPL
811596	1999 CU_{133}	—	February 7, 1999	Kitt Peak	Spacewatch	·	410 m	MPC · JPL
811597	1999 OX_{5}	—	September 15, 2007	Mount Lemmon	Mount Lemmon Survey	·	1.2 km	MPC · JPL
811598	1999 PQ_{9}	—	August 7, 1999	Kitt Peak	Spacewatch	·	520 m	MPC · JPL
811599	1999 RW_{5}	—	September 3, 1999	Kitt Peak	Spacewatch	MAS	660 m	MPC · JPL
811600	1999 TZ_{47}	—	October 4, 1999	Kitt Peak	Spacewatch	NYS	880 m	MPC · JPL

== 811601–811700 ==
back to top

Designation			Discovery			Properties		Ref
Permanent	Provisional	Named after	Date	Site	Discoverer(s)	Category	Diam.	Ref
811601	1999 TM_{68}	—	October 2, 1999	Kitt Peak	Spacewatch	·	1.4 km	MPC · JPL
811602	1999 TN_{227}	—	October 1, 1999	Kitt Peak	Spacewatch	NYS	840 m	MPC · JPL
811603	1999 TH_{304}	—	October 4, 1999	Kitt Peak	Spacewatch	·	1.1 km	MPC · JPL
811604	1999 TP_{308}	—	October 4, 1999	Kitt Peak	Spacewatch	·	820 m	MPC · JPL
811605	1999 TZ_{315}	—	October 9, 1999	Kitt Peak	Spacewatch	MAS	500 m	MPC · JPL
811606	1999 TJ_{321}	—	October 12, 1999	Kitt Peak	Spacewatch	·	940 m	MPC · JPL
811607	1999 TZ_{340}	—	January 19, 2015	Mount Lemmon	Mount Lemmon Survey	·	630 m	MPC · JPL
811608	1999 TA_{343}	—	October 10, 1999	Kitt Peak	Spacewatch	·	850 m	MPC · JPL
811609	1999 UW_{22}	—	October 31, 1999	Kitt Peak	Spacewatch	·	1.4 km	MPC · JPL
811610	1999 US_{59}	—	October 30, 1999	Kitt Peak	Spacewatch	·	1.5 km	MPC · JPL
811611	1999 VZ_{16}	—	October 6, 1999	Socorro	LINEAR	·	470 m	MPC · JPL
811612	1999 VJ_{133}	—	November 10, 1999	Kitt Peak	Spacewatch	·	1.0 km	MPC · JPL
811613	1999 VY_{233}	—	November 1, 2008	Kitt Peak	Spacewatch	·	1.2 km	MPC · JPL
811614	1999 WU_{28}	—	November 29, 1999	Kitt Peak	Spacewatch	·	570 m	MPC · JPL
811615	1999 WF_{29}	—	November 17, 1999	Kitt Peak	Spacewatch	(1338) (FLO)	450 m	MPC · JPL
811616	1999 XG_{266}	—	May 20, 2014	Haleakala	Pan-STARRS 1	·	2.9 km	MPC · JPL
811617	1999 XT_{266}	—	January 26, 2017	Haleakala	Pan-STARRS 1	·	2.9 km	MPC · JPL
811618	2000 AC_{236}	—	January 5, 2000	Kitt Peak	Spacewatch	·	1.9 km	MPC · JPL
811619	2000 BT_{21}	—	January 29, 2000	Kitt Peak	Spacewatch	·	2.7 km	MPC · JPL
811620	2000 BC_{46}	—	January 28, 2000	Kitt Peak	Spacewatch	·	720 m	MPC · JPL
811621	2000 CP_{132}	—	February 4, 2000	Kitt Peak	Spacewatch	·	800 m	MPC · JPL
811622	2000 CQ_{148}	—	May 13, 2004	Kitt Peak	Spacewatch	·	730 m	MPC · JPL
811623	2000 CO_{152}	—	September 21, 2012	Mount Lemmon	Mount Lemmon Survey	·	530 m	MPC · JPL
811624	2000 CT_{152}	—	March 2, 2011	Mount Lemmon	Mount Lemmon Survey	PHO	780 m	MPC · JPL
811625	2000 CN_{154}	—	April 2, 2011	Mount Lemmon	Mount Lemmon Survey	·	640 m	MPC · JPL
811626	2000 CG_{155}	—	August 5, 2011	ESA OGS	ESA OGS	·	700 m	MPC · JPL
811627	2000 CH_{155}	—	November 27, 2009	Mount Lemmon	Mount Lemmon Survey	·	1.3 km	MPC · JPL
811628	2000 CM_{157}	—	February 5, 2000	Kitt Peak	Spacewatch	·	730 m	MPC · JPL
811629	2000 DF_{79}	—	February 29, 2000	Socorro	LINEAR	PHO	890 m	MPC · JPL
811630	2000 EL_{210}	—	January 24, 2018	Mount Lemmon	Mount Lemmon Survey	·	800 m	MPC · JPL
811631	2000 EB_{211}	—	February 28, 2014	Haleakala	Pan-STARRS 1	·	570 m	MPC · JPL
811632	2000 EQ_{211}	—	June 18, 2015	Haleakala	Pan-STARRS 1	·	1.9 km	MPC · JPL
811633	2000 FB_{65}	—	March 25, 2000	Kitt Peak	Spacewatch	NYS	900 m	MPC · JPL
811634	2000 GW_{129}	—	April 5, 2000	Kitt Peak	Spacewatch	NYS	1 km	MPC · JPL
811635	2000 GU_{188}	—	March 12, 2007	Kitt Peak	Spacewatch	·	750 m	MPC · JPL
811636	2000 GC_{189}	—	March 16, 2007	Mount Lemmon	Mount Lemmon Survey	·	650 m	MPC · JPL
811637	2000 HG_{106}	—	February 26, 2014	Haleakala	Pan-STARRS 1	NYS	710 m	MPC · JPL
811638	2000 JQ_{87}	—	February 9, 2008	Mount Lemmon	Mount Lemmon Survey	·	870 m	MPC · JPL
811639	2000 JE_{96}	—	April 5, 2011	Mount Lemmon	Mount Lemmon Survey	·	850 m	MPC · JPL
811640	2000 NL_{1}	—	July 3, 2000	Kitt Peak	Spacewatch	(5)	920 m	MPC · JPL
811641	2000 OM_{64}	—	July 31, 2000	Cerro Tololo	Deep Ecliptic Survey	·	2.0 km	MPC · JPL
811642	2000 OE_{71}	—	March 29, 2012	Haleakala	Pan-STARRS 1	·	970 m	MPC · JPL
811643	2000 OK_{71}	—	September 26, 2017	Haleakala	Pan-STARRS 1	·	890 m	MPC · JPL
811644	2000 OT_{71}	—	February 19, 2009	Kitt Peak	Spacewatch	·	480 m	MPC · JPL
811645	2000 OH_{73}	—	April 13, 2011	Mount Lemmon	Mount Lemmon Survey	·	1.2 km	MPC · JPL
811646	2000 OO_{73}	—	April 5, 2014	Haleakala	Pan-STARRS 1	·	800 m	MPC · JPL
811647	2000 OP_{73}	—	March 25, 2014	Kitt Peak	Spacewatch	·	760 m	MPC · JPL
811648	2000 OB_{74}	—	July 29, 2000	Cerro Tololo	Deep Ecliptic Survey	·	550 m	MPC · JPL
811649	2000 OC_{74}	—	July 31, 2000	Cerro Tololo	Deep Ecliptic Survey	·	830 m	MPC · JPL
811650	2000 PZ_{32}	—	November 10, 2013	Mount Lemmon	Mount Lemmon Survey	(5)	850 m	MPC · JPL
811651	2000 PD_{33}	—	February 26, 2009	Kitt Peak	Spacewatch	·	480 m	MPC · JPL
811652	2000 PV_{33}	—	August 10, 2016	Haleakala	Pan-STARRS 1	·	550 m	MPC · JPL
811653	2000 QS_{211}	—	August 31, 2000	Socorro	LINEAR	·	950 m	MPC · JPL
811654	2000 QN_{238}	—	August 25, 2000	Cerro Tololo	Deep Ecliptic Survey	·	1.5 km	MPC · JPL
811655	2000 QV_{256}	—	September 18, 2011	Mount Lemmon	Mount Lemmon Survey	MAS	470 m	MPC · JPL
811656	2000 QY_{256}	—	October 9, 2007	Mount Lemmon	Mount Lemmon Survey	·	470 m	MPC · JPL
811657	2000 QS_{257}	—	October 24, 2008	Kitt Peak	Spacewatch	NYS	860 m	MPC · JPL
811658	2000 QV_{257}	—	March 11, 2015	Mount Lemmon	Mount Lemmon Survey	MAR	720 m	MPC · JPL
811659	2000 QN_{258}	—	July 26, 2011	Haleakala	Pan-STARRS 1	V	490 m	MPC · JPL
811660	2000 QD_{259}	—	November 6, 2013	Haleakala	Pan-STARRS 1	EUN	750 m	MPC · JPL
811661	2000 QC_{261}	—	May 10, 2007	Mount Lemmon	Mount Lemmon Survey	NYS	800 m	MPC · JPL
811662	2000 RD_{59}	—	September 7, 2000	Kitt Peak	Spacewatch	·	910 m	MPC · JPL
811663	2000 RQ_{109}	—	November 27, 2013	Haleakala	Pan-STARRS 1	(5)	880 m	MPC · JPL
811664	2000 RA_{110}	—	April 22, 2007	Kitt Peak	Spacewatch	NYS	830 m	MPC · JPL
811665	2000 RJ_{113}	—	September 5, 2000	Sacramento Peak	SDSS	·	850 m	MPC · JPL
811666	2000 SF_{11}	—	September 3, 2000	Socorro	LINEAR	·	1.3 km	MPC · JPL
811667	2000 SP_{33}	—	September 24, 2000	Socorro	LINEAR	·	960 m	MPC · JPL
811668	2000 SY_{50}	—	September 23, 2000	Socorro	LINEAR	LIX	2.9 km	MPC · JPL
811669	2000 SP_{194}	—	September 24, 2000	Socorro	LINEAR	·	700 m	MPC · JPL
811670	2000 SU_{342}	—	September 24, 2000	Kitt Peak	Spacewatch	NYS	730 m	MPC · JPL
811671	2000 SU_{377}	—	September 28, 2013	Mount Lemmon	Mount Lemmon Survey	·	1.3 km	MPC · JPL
811672	2000 SN_{379}	—	September 28, 2000	Kitt Peak	Spacewatch	·	910 m	MPC · JPL
811673	2000 SO_{380}	—	October 24, 2013	Kitt Peak	Spacewatch	EUN	910 m	MPC · JPL
811674	2000 SS_{380}	—	January 30, 2006	Kitt Peak	Spacewatch	MAS	560 m	MPC · JPL
811675	2000 SZ_{380}	—	November 9, 2013	Haleakala	Pan-STARRS 1	·	1.1 km	MPC · JPL
811676	2000 SK_{381}	—	September 10, 2007	Mount Lemmon	Mount Lemmon Survey	·	540 m	MPC · JPL
811677	2000 SV_{381}	—	March 31, 2012	Mount Lemmon	Mount Lemmon Survey	·	1.3 km	MPC · JPL
811678	2000 SZ_{383}	—	October 19, 2011	Mount Lemmon	Mount Lemmon Survey	NYS	760 m	MPC · JPL
811679	2000 SM_{384}	—	June 26, 2015	Haleakala	Pan-STARRS 1	MAS	570 m	MPC · JPL
811680	2000 SW_{385}	—	October 18, 2011	Mount Lemmon	Mount Lemmon Survey	MAS	500 m	MPC · JPL
811681	2000 TX	—	October 1, 2000	Socorro	LINEAR	PHO	640 m	MPC · JPL
811682	2000 TG_{4}	—	September 24, 2000	Kitt Peak	Spacewatch	·	800 m	MPC · JPL
811683	2000 TL_{52}	—	October 1, 2000	Socorro	LINEAR	·	500 m	MPC · JPL
811684	2000 TP_{71}	—	October 4, 2000	Kitt Peak	Spacewatch	MAS	530 m	MPC · JPL
811685	2000 TT_{78}	—	April 4, 2014	Kitt Peak	Spacewatch	·	2.5 km	MPC · JPL
811686	2000 TO_{80}	—	October 3, 2011	Mount Lemmon	Mount Lemmon Survey	·	740 m	MPC · JPL
811687	2000 TN_{81}	—	November 11, 1996	Kitt Peak	Spacewatch	·	990 m	MPC · JPL
811688	2000 TS_{81}	—	February 26, 2014	Haleakala	Pan-STARRS 1	·	900 m	MPC · JPL
811689	2000 UN_{31}	—	October 2, 2000	Kitt Peak	Spacewatch	·	910 m	MPC · JPL
811690	2000 UR_{115}	—	September 29, 2011	Mount Lemmon	Mount Lemmon Survey	·	960 m	MPC · JPL
811691	2000 UC_{116}	—	February 8, 2016	Mount Lemmon	Mount Lemmon Survey	·	730 m	MPC · JPL
811692	2000 WY_{105}	—	November 29, 2000	Kitt Peak	Spacewatch	·	820 m	MPC · JPL
811693	2000 WT_{204}	—	October 2, 2016	Mount Lemmon	Mount Lemmon Survey	·	2.0 km	MPC · JPL
811694	2000 XW_{55}	—	April 15, 2015	Kitt Peak	Spacewatch	·	1.3 km	MPC · JPL
811695	2000 XK_{56}	—	October 26, 2011	Haleakala	Pan-STARRS 1	·	920 m	MPC · JPL
811696	2000 YM_{144}	—	December 28, 2013	Nogales	M. Schwartz, P. R. Holvorcem	·	1.3 km	MPC · JPL
811697	2000 YV_{146}	—	December 21, 2000	Mount Bohyeon	Bohyunsan Optical Astronomy Observatory	·	1.4 km	MPC · JPL
811698	2001 AA_{6}	—	January 2, 2001	Socorro	LINEAR	EUP	4.0 km	MPC · JPL
811699	2001 CG_{50}	—	March 13, 2012	Mount Lemmon	Mount Lemmon Survey	NYS	780 m	MPC · JPL
811700	2001 DZ_{112}	—	September 22, 2003	Kitt Peak	Spacewatch	·	660 m	MPC · JPL

== 811701–811800 ==
back to top

Designation			Discovery			Properties		Ref
Permanent	Provisional	Named after	Date	Site	Discoverer(s)	Category	Diam.	Ref
811701	2001 DV_{114}	—	February 19, 2001	Kitt Peak	Spacewatch	·	740 m	MPC · JPL
811702	2001 DL_{115}	—	August 12, 2015	Haleakala	Pan-STARRS 1	H	370 m	MPC · JPL
811703	2001 DP_{115}	—	February 20, 2015	Haleakala	Pan-STARRS 1	PHO	690 m	MPC · JPL
811704	2001 DZ_{117}	—	January 19, 2008	Kitt Peak	Spacewatch	NYS	770 m	MPC · JPL
811705	2001 FZ_{84}	—	March 20, 2001	Haleakala	NEAT	·	570 m	MPC · JPL
811706	2001 FZ_{85}	—	March 26, 2001	Cerro Tololo	Deep Lens Survey	MAR	620 m	MPC · JPL
811707	2001 FW_{183}	—	March 26, 2001	Kitt Peak	Spacewatch	·	590 m	MPC · JPL
811708	2001 FP_{206}	—	March 26, 2001	Kitt Peak	Deep Ecliptic Survey	CLA	1.0 km	MPC · JPL
811709	2001 FZ_{211}	—	March 21, 2001	Kitt Peak	SKADS	·	990 m	MPC · JPL
811710	2001 FF_{214}	—	March 25, 2001	Kitt Peak	Deep Ecliptic Survey	EUN	750 m	MPC · JPL
811711	2001 FJ_{229}	—	March 23, 2001	Kitt Peak	SKADS	(5)	840 m	MPC · JPL
811712	2001 FD_{231}	—	March 27, 2008	Mount Lemmon	Mount Lemmon Survey	V	390 m	MPC · JPL
811713	2001 FW_{232}	—	March 21, 2001	Kitt Peak	SKADS	V	410 m	MPC · JPL
811714	2001 FV_{244}	—	March 19, 2001	Sacramento Peak	SDSS	·	1.4 km	MPC · JPL
811715	2001 FG_{245}	—	September 16, 2010	Mount Lemmon	Mount Lemmon Survey	·	2.4 km	MPC · JPL
811716	2001 FX_{245}	—	March 23, 2001	Kitt Peak	Spacewatch	·	580 m	MPC · JPL
811717	2001 FZ_{247}	—	October 26, 2011	Haleakala	Pan-STARRS 1	·	720 m	MPC · JPL
811718	2001 FC_{248}	—	September 6, 2008	Kitt Peak	Spacewatch	·	2.4 km	MPC · JPL
811719	2001 HD_{24}	—	April 26, 2001	Kitt Peak	Spacewatch	·	1.3 km	MPC · JPL
811720	2001 HO_{70}	—	September 22, 2012	Kitt Peak	Spacewatch	·	490 m	MPC · JPL
811721	2001 HF_{71}	—	April 1, 2008	Kitt Peak	Spacewatch	·	500 m	MPC · JPL
811722	2001 KL_{82}	—	February 27, 2008	Mount Lemmon	Mount Lemmon Survey	·	850 m	MPC · JPL
811723	2001 KA_{83}	—	September 14, 1998	Kitt Peak	Spacewatch	MAS	450 m	MPC · JPL
811724	2001 KF_{83}	—	March 10, 2008	Kitt Peak	Spacewatch	·	490 m	MPC · JPL
811725	2001 KL_{83}	—	November 24, 2014	Kitt Peak	Spacewatch	·	950 m	MPC · JPL
811726	2001 KR_{86}	—	April 10, 2013	Haleakala	Pan-STARRS 1	(5)	720 m	MPC · JPL
811727	2001 KR_{87}	—	October 3, 2006	Mount Lemmon	Mount Lemmon Survey	MRX	700 m	MPC · JPL
811728	2001 KV_{87}	—	October 9, 2016	Kitt Peak	Spacewatch	·	680 m	MPC · JPL
811729	2001 MU_{31}	—	January 4, 2011	Mount Lemmon	Mount Lemmon Survey	TIR	2.0 km	MPC · JPL
811730	2001 ME_{32}	—	June 26, 2001	Kitt Peak	Spacewatch	·	720 m	MPC · JPL
811731	2001 OW_{114}	—	March 29, 2011	Catalina	CSS	·	650 m	MPC · JPL
811732	2001 OY_{114}	—	August 9, 2015	Haleakala	Pan-STARRS 1	·	550 m	MPC · JPL
811733	2001 PS_{9}	—	August 11, 2001	Palomar	NEAT	·	960 m	MPC · JPL
811734	2001 PT_{66}	—	August 10, 2001	Palomar	NEAT	TIR	2.1 km	MPC · JPL
811735	2001 QO_{253}	—	August 25, 2001	Socorro	LINEAR	·	960 m	MPC · JPL
811736	2001 QJ_{299}	—	August 19, 2001	Cerro Tololo	Deep Ecliptic Survey	V	370 m	MPC · JPL
811737	2001 QV_{308}	—	August 19, 2001	Cerro Tololo	Deep Ecliptic Survey	·	740 m	MPC · JPL
811738	2001 QP_{321}	—	August 20, 2001	Cerro Tololo	Deep Ecliptic Survey	·	730 m	MPC · JPL
811739	2001 QK_{328}	—	August 27, 2001	Palomar	NEAT	fast	970 m	MPC · JPL
811740	2001 QX_{336}	—	April 20, 2014	Mount Lemmon	Mount Lemmon Survey	V	410 m	MPC · JPL
811741	2001 QC_{337}	—	January 18, 2015	Haleakala	Pan-STARRS 1	·	1.1 km	MPC · JPL
811742	2001 QN_{338}	—	October 7, 2016	Mount Lemmon	Mount Lemmon Survey	·	860 m	MPC · JPL
811743	2001 QO_{338}	—	September 18, 2012	Kitt Peak	Spacewatch	·	780 m	MPC · JPL
811744	2001 QR_{338}	—	April 5, 2014	Haleakala	Pan-STARRS 1	·	1.6 km	MPC · JPL
811745	2001 QZ_{338}	—	August 23, 2001	Kitt Peak	Spacewatch	·	530 m	MPC · JPL
811746	2001 QY_{339}	—	August 22, 2001	Kitt Peak	Spacewatch	·	880 m	MPC · JPL
811747	2001 RK_{4}	—	August 23, 2001	Anderson Mesa	LONEOS	·	950 m	MPC · JPL
811748	2001 RX_{20}	—	August 13, 2001	Haleakala	NEAT	·	570 m	MPC · JPL
811749	2001 RF_{118}	—	September 12, 2001	Socorro	LINEAR	·	760 m	MPC · JPL
811750	2001 RD_{140}	—	September 12, 2001	Socorro	LINEAR	·	900 m	MPC · JPL
811751	2001 SS_{80}	—	August 24, 2001	Palomar	NEAT	·	1.6 km	MPC · JPL
811752	2001 SM_{88}	—	September 12, 2001	Socorro	LINEAR	·	800 m	MPC · JPL
811753	2001 SG_{103}	—	May 22, 2001	Cerro Tololo	Deep Ecliptic Survey	·	460 m	MPC · JPL
811754	2001 SG_{132}	—	July 20, 2001	Palomar	NEAT	·	2.4 km	MPC · JPL
811755	2001 SA_{193}	—	September 19, 2001	Socorro	LINEAR	·	800 m	MPC · JPL
811756	2001 SZ_{299}	—	August 24, 2001	Kitt Peak	Spacewatch	·	1.8 km	MPC · JPL
811757	2001 SH_{300}	—	September 20, 2001	Socorro	LINEAR	·	560 m	MPC · JPL
811758	2001 ST_{329}	—	September 19, 2001	Kitt Peak	Spacewatch	NYS	880 m	MPC · JPL
811759	2001 SX_{357}	—	October 24, 2001	Palomar	NEAT	·	570 m	MPC · JPL
811760	2001 SV_{359}	—	October 1, 2005	Mount Lemmon	Mount Lemmon Survey	·	910 m	MPC · JPL
811761	2001 SX_{359}	—	September 6, 2008	Kitt Peak	Spacewatch	·	560 m	MPC · JPL
811762	2001 SG_{360}	—	September 21, 2001	Kitt Peak	Spacewatch	AEO	730 m	MPC · JPL
811763	2001 SR_{362}	—	November 4, 2007	Mount Lemmon	Mount Lemmon Survey	·	2.7 km	MPC · JPL
811764	2001 TW_{128}	—	September 20, 2001	Socorro	LINEAR	·	710 m	MPC · JPL
811765	2001 TN_{155}	—	October 14, 2001	Kitt Peak	Spacewatch	H	350 m	MPC · JPL
811766	2001 TH_{157}	—	October 14, 2001	Kitt Peak	Spacewatch	·	850 m	MPC · JPL
811767	2001 TO_{184}	—	October 14, 2001	Socorro	LINEAR	·	580 m	MPC · JPL
811768	2001 TB_{210}	—	July 16, 2001	Haleakala	NEAT	·	890 m	MPC · JPL
811769	2001 TH_{259}	—	October 15, 2001	Palomar	NEAT	·	620 m	MPC · JPL
811770	2001 TR_{259}	—	September 23, 2001	Kitt Peak	Spacewatch	·	770 m	MPC · JPL
811771	2001 TU_{259}	—	October 11, 2001	Palomar Mountain	NEAT	·	520 m	MPC · JPL
811772	2001 TO_{260}	—	October 14, 2001	Sacramento Peak	SDSS	·	520 m	MPC · JPL
811773	2001 TE_{261}	—	August 30, 2005	Kitt Peak	Spacewatch	·	890 m	MPC · JPL
811774	2001 TT_{262}	—	October 14, 2001	Sacramento Peak	SDSS	·	760 m	MPC · JPL
811775	2001 TB_{263}	—	September 27, 2008	Mount Lemmon	Mount Lemmon Survey	·	540 m	MPC · JPL
811776	2001 TH_{266}	—	March 17, 2018	Haleakala	Pan-STARRS 1	V	550 m	MPC · JPL
811777	2001 TV_{266}	—	October 15, 2001	Kitt Peak	Spacewatch	·	910 m	MPC · JPL
811778	2001 TL_{268}	—	October 6, 2012	Mount Lemmon	Mount Lemmon Survey	MAS	600 m	MPC · JPL
811779	2001 UA_{67}	—	October 20, 2001	Socorro	LINEAR	·	550 m	MPC · JPL
811780	2001 UO_{86}	—	October 17, 2001	Kitt Peak	Spacewatch	·	560 m	MPC · JPL
811781	2001 UP_{147}	—	October 18, 2001	Palomar	NEAT	·	520 m	MPC · JPL
811782	2001 UQ_{166}	—	October 24, 2001	Kitt Peak	Spacewatch	T_{j} (2.98) · EUP	2.6 km	MPC · JPL
811783	2001 UA_{195}	—	October 14, 2001	Kitt Peak	Spacewatch	NYS	940 m	MPC · JPL
811784	2001 UE_{195}	—	October 18, 2001	Palomar	NEAT	RAF	720 m	MPC · JPL
811785	2001 US_{200}	—	October 21, 2001	Socorro	LINEAR	·	870 m	MPC · JPL
811786	2001 UF_{209}	—	October 20, 2001	Socorro	LINEAR	·	1.7 km	MPC · JPL
811787	2001 UM_{231}	—	November 18, 2001	Sacramento Peak	SDSS	·	530 m	MPC · JPL
811788	2001 UA_{235}	—	September 22, 2009	Catalina	CSS	EUN	960 m	MPC · JPL
811789	2001 UB_{235}	—	November 30, 2005	Kitt Peak	Spacewatch	·	700 m	MPC · JPL
811790	2001 UC_{237}	—	April 18, 2015	Cerro Tololo	DECam	·	870 m	MPC · JPL
811791	2001 UC_{238}	—	October 25, 2001	Sacramento Peak	SDSS	·	940 m	MPC · JPL
811792	2001 UF_{238}	—	October 25, 2001	Sacramento Peak	SDSS	·	2.4 km	MPC · JPL
811793	2001 UC_{240}	—	September 26, 2008	Kitt Peak	Spacewatch	·	460 m	MPC · JPL
811794	2001 UK_{240}	—	September 22, 2011	Kitt Peak	Spacewatch	·	490 m	MPC · JPL
811795	2001 UL_{241}	—	October 25, 2001	Sacramento Peak	SDSS	·	490 m	MPC · JPL
811796	2001 UP_{241}	—	October 17, 2001	Kitt Peak	Spacewatch	·	2.0 km	MPC · JPL
811797	2001 WO_{7}	—	November 17, 2001	Socorro	LINEAR	·	570 m	MPC · JPL
811798	2001 WK_{22}	—	November 16, 2001	Kitt Peak	Deep Lens Survey	·	420 m	MPC · JPL
811799	2001 WR_{73}	—	October 15, 2001	Kitt Peak	Spacewatch	·	480 m	MPC · JPL
811800	2001 WP_{104}	—	November 20, 2001	Socorro	LINEAR	·	1.2 km	MPC · JPL

== 811801–811900 ==
back to top

Designation			Discovery			Properties		Ref
Permanent	Provisional	Named after	Date	Site	Discoverer(s)	Category	Diam.	Ref
811801	2001 WQ_{105}	—	March 25, 2015	Mount Lemmon	Mount Lemmon Survey	BRG	1.2 km	MPC · JPL
811802	2001 XP_{42}	—	December 9, 2001	Socorro	LINEAR	·	840 m	MPC · JPL
811803	2001 XJ_{242}	—	December 14, 2001	Socorro	LINEAR	·	760 m	MPC · JPL
811804	2001 XT_{269}	—	October 17, 2010	Mount Lemmon	Mount Lemmon Survey	·	1.1 km	MPC · JPL
811805	2001 YP_{31}	—	December 18, 2001	Socorro	LINEAR	EUN	920 m	MPC · JPL
811806	2001 YE_{151}	—	December 19, 2001	Kitt Peak	Spacewatch	·	490 m	MPC · JPL
811807	2001 YD_{164}	—	December 29, 2013	Catalina	CSS	·	830 m	MPC · JPL
811808	2002 AQ_{215}	—	January 14, 2002	Kitt Peak	Spacewatch	·	1.7 km	MPC · JPL
811809	2002 AL_{216}	—	January 30, 2006	Kitt Peak	Spacewatch	·	810 m	MPC · JPL
811810	2002 BH_{33}	—	January 21, 2002	Kitt Peak	Spacewatch	NYS	810 m	MPC · JPL
811811	2002 CZ_{43}	—	February 10, 2002	Socorro	LINEAR	H	320 m	MPC · JPL
811812	2002 CX_{262}	—	February 9, 2002	Kitt Peak	Spacewatch	NYS	840 m	MPC · JPL
811813	2002 CL_{274}	—	February 8, 2002	Kitt Peak	Spacewatch	·	2.1 km	MPC · JPL
811814	2002 CX_{310}	—	February 10, 2002	Socorro	LINEAR	·	1.4 km	MPC · JPL
811815	2002 CY_{316}	—	February 10, 2002	Kitt Peak	Spacewatch	H	390 m	MPC · JPL
811816	2002 CJ_{321}	—	October 24, 2013	Mount Lemmon	Mount Lemmon Survey	·	1.2 km	MPC · JPL
811817	2002 CM_{321}	—	December 11, 2013	Haleakala	Pan-STARRS 1	·	1.3 km	MPC · JPL
811818	2002 CQ_{321}	—	August 8, 2016	Haleakala	Pan-STARRS 1	H	390 m	MPC · JPL
811819	2002 CC_{322}	—	May 1, 2012	Mount Lemmon	Mount Lemmon Survey	·	510 m	MPC · JPL
811820	2002 CZ_{322}	—	October 2, 2016	Haleakala	Pan-STARRS 1	·	2.2 km	MPC · JPL
811821	2002 CB_{323}	—	April 23, 2012	Kitt Peak	Spacewatch	·	420 m	MPC · JPL
811822	2002 CT_{323}	—	January 9, 2013	Kitt Peak	Spacewatch	·	890 m	MPC · JPL
811823	2002 CF_{325}	—	August 23, 2007	Kitt Peak	Spacewatch	·	720 m	MPC · JPL
811824	2002 CV_{325}	—	September 30, 2016	Haleakala	Pan-STARRS 1	·	380 m	MPC · JPL
811825	2002 CE_{326}	—	March 13, 2012	Mount Lemmon	Mount Lemmon Survey	·	440 m	MPC · JPL
811826	2002 CO_{327}	—	August 23, 2003	Cerro Tololo	Deep Ecliptic Survey	·	900 m	MPC · JPL
811827	2002 CY_{328}	—	February 12, 2002	Kitt Peak	Spacewatch	·	480 m	MPC · JPL
811828	2002 CP_{329}	—	February 6, 2002	Kitt Peak	Deep Ecliptic Survey	·	880 m	MPC · JPL
811829	2002 CW_{329}	—	February 6, 2002	Kitt Peak	Deep Ecliptic Survey	·	1.3 km	MPC · JPL
811830	2002 DV_{17}	—	February 20, 2002	Kitt Peak	Spacewatch	·	760 m	MPC · JPL
811831	2002 DK_{22}	—	February 20, 2002	Kitt Peak	Spacewatch	·	1 km	MPC · JPL
811832	2002 EZ_{23}	—	March 5, 2002	Kitt Peak	Spacewatch	·	670 m	MPC · JPL
811833	2002 ER_{116}	—	March 9, 2002	Kitt Peak	Spacewatch	·	450 m	MPC · JPL
811834	2002 ET_{168}	—	December 24, 2014	Mount Lemmon	Mount Lemmon Survey	·	380 m	MPC · JPL
811835	2002 EY_{168}	—	January 23, 2015	Haleakala	Pan-STARRS 1	MAR	720 m	MPC · JPL
811836	2002 EY_{171}	—	January 28, 2017	Haleakala	Pan-STARRS 1	MAS	490 m	MPC · JPL
811837	2002 EE_{172}	—	April 21, 2006	Mount Lemmon	Mount Lemmon Survey	·	810 m	MPC · JPL
811838	2002 EQ_{172}	—	March 5, 2002	Kitt Peak	Spacewatch	NYS	790 m	MPC · JPL
811839	2002 FM_{17}	—	January 13, 2002	Kitt Peak	Spacewatch	MAS	640 m	MPC · JPL
811840	2002 FM_{19}	—	March 18, 2002	Kitt Peak	Deep Ecliptic Survey	·	840 m	MPC · JPL
811841	2002 FQ_{23}	—	March 18, 2002	Kitt Peak	Spacewatch	·	1.6 km	MPC · JPL
811842	2002 FO_{41}	—	March 18, 2002	Kitt Peak	Spacewatch	·	930 m	MPC · JPL
811843	2002 FX_{42}	—	November 3, 2008	Kitt Peak	Spacewatch	MAS	610 m	MPC · JPL
811844	2002 FA_{44}	—	January 17, 2013	Haleakala	Pan-STARRS 1	·	810 m	MPC · JPL
811845	2002 FF_{44}	—	August 28, 2006	Kitt Peak	Spacewatch	·	360 m	MPC · JPL
811846	2002 GY_{3}	—	April 8, 2002	Palomar	NEAT	·	940 m	MPC · JPL
811847	2002 GX_{6}	—	April 14, 2002	Kitt Peak	Spacewatch	H	250 m	MPC · JPL
811848	2002 GS_{9}	—	April 11, 2002	Socorro	LINEAR	H	430 m	MPC · JPL
811849	2002 GS_{31}	—	February 6, 2002	Kitt Peak	Deep Ecliptic Survey	·	480 m	MPC · JPL
811850	2002 GF_{108}	—	April 11, 2002	Socorro	LINEAR	·	1.5 km	MPC · JPL
811851	2002 GW_{139}	—	March 13, 2002	Kitt Peak	Spacewatch	·	510 m	MPC · JPL
811852	2002 GE_{180}	—	April 19, 2002	Kitt Peak	Spacewatch	·	500 m	MPC · JPL
811853	2002 GW_{193}	—	March 17, 2009	Kitt Peak	Spacewatch	·	530 m	MPC · JPL
811854	2002 GY_{193}	—	October 1, 2010	Mount Lemmon	Mount Lemmon Survey	·	540 m	MPC · JPL
811855	2002 GE_{194}	—	October 4, 2013	Kitt Peak	Spacewatch	JUN	800 m	MPC · JPL
811856	2002 GG_{194}	—	March 24, 2009	Kitt Peak	Spacewatch	·	570 m	MPC · JPL
811857	2002 GP_{195}	—	November 18, 2008	Kitt Peak	Spacewatch	·	950 m	MPC · JPL
811858	2002 GQ_{195}	—	September 29, 2011	Mount Lemmon	Mount Lemmon Survey	·	1.2 km	MPC · JPL
811859	2002 GK_{197}	—	July 26, 2015	Haleakala	Pan-STARRS 1	·	830 m	MPC · JPL
811860	2002 GT_{197}	—	April 15, 2013	Haleakala	Pan-STARRS 1	·	1.7 km	MPC · JPL
811861	2002 GV_{197}	—	December 4, 2016	Mount Lemmon	Mount Lemmon Survey	·	1.5 km	MPC · JPL
811862	2002 GG_{198}	—	April 11, 2002	Palomar	NEAT	·	1.4 km	MPC · JPL
811863	2002 JN_{150}	—	May 10, 2002	Palomar	NEAT	·	1.3 km	MPC · JPL
811864	2002 KS_{16}	—	May 18, 2002	Palomar	NEAT	·	1.2 km	MPC · JPL
811865	2002 KM_{17}	—	March 16, 2005	Mount Lemmon	Mount Lemmon Survey	·	490 m	MPC · JPL
811866	2002 LW_{65}	—	November 13, 2010	Kitt Peak	Spacewatch	·	590 m	MPC · JPL
811867	2002 MC_{8}	—	August 13, 2017	Haleakala	Pan-STARRS 1	PHO	720 m	MPC · JPL
811868	2002 ML_{8}	—	May 22, 2012	ESA OGS	ESA OGS	·	540 m	MPC · JPL
811869	2002 NA_{60}	—	July 14, 2002	Palomar	NEAT	·	510 m	MPC · JPL
811870	2002 NF_{67}	—	July 5, 2002	Kitt Peak	Spacewatch	·	870 m	MPC · JPL
811871	2002 NM_{67}	—	August 6, 2002	Palomar Mountain	NEAT	·	2.5 km	MPC · JPL
811872	2002 NC_{75}	—	July 10, 2002	Palomar	NEAT	H	460 m	MPC · JPL
811873	2002 NX_{78}	—	July 12, 2002	Palomar Mountain	NEAT	PHO	620 m	MPC · JPL
811874	2002 NV_{82}	—	August 27, 2012	Haleakala	Pan-STARRS 1	·	570 m	MPC · JPL
811875	2002 NY_{82}	—	November 8, 2010	Kitt Peak	Spacewatch	·	910 m	MPC · JPL
811876	2002 OH_{24}	—	July 29, 2002	Palomar	NEAT	·	2.4 km	MPC · JPL
811877	2002 ON_{25}	—	July 21, 2002	Palomar	NEAT	·	2.6 km	MPC · JPL
811878	2002 OA_{27}	—	July 19, 2002	Palomar	NEAT	TIR	2.3 km	MPC · JPL
811879	2002 OX_{34}	—	August 19, 2006	Kitt Peak	Spacewatch	MAS	560 m	MPC · JPL
811880	2002 OC_{37}	—	July 17, 2002	Palomar	NEAT	(883)	530 m	MPC · JPL
811881	2002 PE_{6}	—	August 2, 2002	Campo Imperatore	CINEOS	·	2.0 km	MPC · JPL
811882	2002 PE_{87}	—	August 5, 2002	Palomar	NEAT	H	450 m	MPC · JPL
811883	2002 PC_{149}	—	August 20, 2002	Palomar	NEAT	·	510 m	MPC · JPL
811884	2002 PL_{175}	—	August 11, 2002	Palomar	NEAT	·	1.2 km	MPC · JPL
811885	2002 PE_{188}	—	August 8, 2002	Palomar Mountain	NEAT	·	490 m	MPC · JPL
811886	2002 PB_{192}	—	August 15, 2002	Palomar Mountain	NEAT	H	370 m	MPC · JPL
811887	2002 PE_{193}	—	August 8, 2002	Palomar	NEAT	·	670 m	MPC · JPL
811888	2002 PR_{197}	—	August 7, 2002	Palomar Mountain	NEAT	·	1.2 km	MPC · JPL
811889	2002 PV_{198}	—	August 8, 2002	Palomar Mountain	NEAT	·	1.6 km	MPC · JPL
811890	2002 PZ_{201}	—	September 14, 2012	Catalina	CSS	·	550 m	MPC · JPL
811891	2002 PH_{205}	—	April 23, 2015	Haleakala	Pan-STARRS 2	·	520 m	MPC · JPL
811892	2002 QZ_{10}	—	August 16, 2002	Palomar	NEAT	EUP	2.9 km	MPC · JPL
811893	2002 QC_{22}	—	August 12, 2002	Socorro	LINEAR	THB	2.7 km	MPC · JPL
811894	2002 QT_{29}	—	July 29, 2002	Palomar	NEAT	·	540 m	MPC · JPL
811895	2002 QN_{38}	—	August 30, 2002	Kitt Peak	Spacewatch	·	730 m	MPC · JPL
811896	2002 QD_{59}	—	August 26, 2002	Palomar Mountain	NEAT	·	1.1 km	MPC · JPL
811897	2002 QT_{71}	—	August 18, 2002	Palomar Mountain	NEAT	H	300 m	MPC · JPL
811898	2002 QC_{74}	—	August 30, 2002	Palomar Mountain	NEAT	·	1.3 km	MPC · JPL
811899	2002 QB_{75}	—	August 18, 2002	Palomar	NEAT	·	550 m	MPC · JPL
811900	2002 QS_{84}	—	August 30, 2002	Palomar Mountain	NEAT	·	1.5 km	MPC · JPL

== 811901–812000 ==
back to top

Designation			Discovery			Properties		Ref
Permanent	Provisional	Named after	Date	Site	Discoverer(s)	Category	Diam.	Ref
811901	2002 QA_{95}	—	October 10, 2002	Sacramento Peak	SDSS	·	1.5 km	MPC · JPL
811902	2002 QW_{96}	—	August 26, 2002	Palomar	NEAT	·	470 m	MPC · JPL
811903	2002 QM_{97}	—	August 8, 2002	Campo Imperatore	CINEOS	·	570 m	MPC · JPL
811904	2002 QJ_{103}	—	August 29, 2002	Palomar Mountain	NEAT	·	500 m	MPC · JPL
811905	2002 QG_{107}	—	August 17, 2002	Palomar Mountain	NEAT	·	480 m	MPC · JPL
811906	2002 QH_{108}	—	August 17, 2002	Palomar Mountain	NEAT	·	500 m	MPC · JPL
811907	2002 QA_{113}	—	August 27, 2002	Palomar Mountain	NEAT	·	1.1 km	MPC · JPL
811908	2002 QH_{113}	—	August 27, 2002	Palomar Mountain	NEAT	·	1.5 km	MPC · JPL
811909	2002 QM_{118}	—	August 30, 2002	Palomar Mountain	NEAT	·	550 m	MPC · JPL
811910	2002 QY_{118}	—	August 18, 2002	Palomar Mountain	NEAT	·	630 m	MPC · JPL
811911	2002 QT_{119}	—	August 17, 2002	Palomar	NEAT	·	550 m	MPC · JPL
811912	2002 QH_{131}	—	August 30, 2002	Palomar Mountain	NEAT	·	1.1 km	MPC · JPL
811913	2002 QU_{140}	—	August 16, 2002	Palomar	NEAT	·	2.5 km	MPC · JPL
811914	2002 QV_{150}	—	August 28, 2002	Palomar Mountain	NEAT	·	2.4 km	MPC · JPL
811915	2002 QO_{157}	—	August 31, 2002	Kitt Peak	Spacewatch	·	490 m	MPC · JPL
811916	2002 RW_{155}	—	September 11, 2002	Palomar	NEAT	·	1.2 km	MPC · JPL
811917	2002 RE_{181}	—	July 21, 2002	Palomar	NEAT	·	1.3 km	MPC · JPL
811918	2002 RN_{238}	—	September 12, 2002	Palomar	NEAT	NYS	660 m	MPC · JPL
811919	2002 RT_{246}	—	September 14, 2002	Palomar	NEAT	·	1.2 km	MPC · JPL
811920	2002 RP_{257}	—	September 1, 2002	Palomar Mountain	NEAT	MAS	580 m	MPC · JPL
811921	2002 RL_{263}	—	September 13, 2002	Palomar Mountain	NEAT	·	1.9 km	MPC · JPL
811922	2002 RJ_{268}	—	September 4, 2002	Palomar Mountain	NEAT	·	990 m	MPC · JPL
811923	2002 RY_{268}	—	September 1, 2002	Palomar Mountain	NEAT	·	1.9 km	MPC · JPL
811924	2002 RV_{277}	—	October 5, 2002	Sacramento Peak	SDSS	·	880 m	MPC · JPL
811925	2002 RY_{283}	—	October 8, 2002	Kitt Peak	Spacewatch	·	650 m	MPC · JPL
811926	2002 RN_{285}	—	September 5, 2002	Sacramento Peak	SDSS	·	950 m	MPC · JPL
811927	2002 RB_{288}	—	September 12, 2002	Palomar	NEAT	·	1.6 km	MPC · JPL
811928	2002 RB_{290}	—	September 4, 2002	Palomar Mountain	NEAT	(18466)	1.6 km	MPC · JPL
811929	2002 RF_{293}	—	August 4, 2002	Palomar	NEAT	·	1.2 km	MPC · JPL
811930	2002 RV_{296}	—	November 1, 2013	Mount Lemmon	Mount Lemmon Survey	·	1.4 km	MPC · JPL
811931	2002 RG_{297}	—	September 11, 2002	Palomar Mountain	NEAT	·	520 m	MPC · JPL
811932	2002 RN_{299}	—	August 14, 2012	Haleakala	Pan-STARRS 1	·	570 m	MPC · JPL
811933	2002 SN_{26}	—	September 7, 2002	Socorro	LINEAR	·	1.3 km	MPC · JPL
811934	2002 SP_{69}	—	September 26, 2002	Palomar Mountain	NEAT	·	1.5 km	MPC · JPL
811935 Robertslobins	2002 SW_{73}	Robertslobins	September 27, 2002	Palomar	NEAT	·	490 m	MPC · JPL
811936	2002 SX_{74}	—	September 22, 2002	Palomar	NEAT	·	1.6 km	MPC · JPL
811937	2002 TN_{18}	—	October 2, 2002	Socorro	LINEAR	·	550 m	MPC · JPL
811938	2002 TO_{106}	—	October 4, 2002	Palomar	NEAT	·	2.1 km	MPC · JPL
811939	2002 TD_{114}	—	October 3, 2002	Palomar	NEAT	·	1.9 km	MPC · JPL
811940	2002 TU_{152}	—	October 5, 2002	Palomar	NEAT	·	1.8 km	MPC · JPL
811941	2002 TY_{152}	—	October 5, 2002	Palomar	NEAT	T_{j} (2.98) · 3:2	3.2 km	MPC · JPL
811942	2002 TP_{156}	—	October 5, 2002	Palomar	NEAT	·	1.1 km	MPC · JPL
811943	2002 TC_{193}	—	October 3, 2002	Palomar	NEAT	·	1.3 km	MPC · JPL
811944	2002 TF_{380}	—	October 5, 2002	Palomar Mountain	NEAT	·	1.1 km	MPC · JPL
811945	2002 TJ_{380}	—	October 6, 2002	Palomar Mountain	NEAT	·	600 m	MPC · JPL
811946	2002 TW_{384}	—	October 4, 2002	Sacramento Peak	SDSS	GEF	940 m	MPC · JPL
811947	2002 TX_{386}	—	October 6, 2002	Haleakala	NEAT	H	390 m	MPC · JPL
811948	2002 TD_{391}	—	November 12, 2013	Mount Lemmon	Mount Lemmon Survey	·	600 m	MPC · JPL
811949	2002 TQ_{392}	—	January 28, 2017	Haleakala	Pan-STARRS 1	·	590 m	MPC · JPL
811950	2002 TZ_{393}	—	September 30, 2016	Haleakala	Pan-STARRS 1	·	670 m	MPC · JPL
811951	2002 TH_{394}	—	August 12, 2016	Haleakala	Pan-STARRS 1	V	500 m	MPC · JPL
811952	2002 US_{23}	—	October 28, 2002	Palomar	NEAT	·	720 m	MPC · JPL
811953	2002 UP_{36}	—	October 3, 2002	Socorro	LINEAR	T_{j} (2.88)	2.5 km	MPC · JPL
811954	2002 UM_{77}	—	October 18, 2002	Palomar Mountain	NEAT	·	850 m	MPC · JPL
811955	2002 VW_{39}	—	November 5, 2002	Socorro	LINEAR	·	1.8 km	MPC · JPL
811956	2002 VM_{129}	—	November 5, 2002	Kitt Peak	Spacewatch	3:2	3.9 km	MPC · JPL
811957	2002 VC_{130}	—	March 9, 2011	Mount Lemmon	Mount Lemmon Survey	·	560 m	MPC · JPL
811958	2002 VF_{151}	—	February 10, 2011	Mount Lemmon	Mount Lemmon Survey	·	620 m	MPC · JPL
811959	2002 VJ_{151}	—	October 12, 2013	Kitt Peak	Spacewatch	MAS	530 m	MPC · JPL
811960	2002 VP_{151}	—	December 9, 2015	Haleakala	Pan-STARRS 1	·	1.0 km	MPC · JPL
811961	2002 VA_{152}	—	November 15, 2002	Palomar	NEAT	·	1.6 km	MPC · JPL
811962	2002 VZ_{152}	—	March 13, 2013	Haleakala	Pan-STARRS 1	·	1 km	MPC · JPL
811963	2002 WZ_{24}	—	November 25, 2002	Palomar Mountain	NEAT	·	1.1 km	MPC · JPL
811964	2002 WZ_{26}	—	November 24, 2002	Palomar Mountain	NEAT	MAS	620 m	MPC · JPL
811965	2002 WC_{30}	—	November 23, 2002	Palomar Mountain	NEAT	EUN	850 m	MPC · JPL
811966	2002 WK_{31}	—	November 28, 2002	Haleakala	NEAT	·	1.6 km	MPC · JPL
811967	2002 WX_{31}	—	October 13, 2010	Catalina	CSS	H	430 m	MPC · JPL
811968	2002 WV_{32}	—	July 18, 2012	Siding Spring	SSS	·	710 m	MPC · JPL
811969	2002 XT_{37}	—	December 8, 2002	Haleakala	NEAT	·	1.4 km	MPC · JPL
811970	2002 XW_{44}	—	December 7, 2002	Socorro	LINEAR	H	600 m	MPC · JPL
811971	2002 XC_{120}	—	December 11, 2002	Palomar Mountain	NEAT	·	1.4 km	MPC · JPL
811972	2002 XL_{120}	—	December 3, 2002	Palomar Mountain	NEAT	·	1.1 km	MPC · JPL
811973	2002 XT_{122}	—	September 28, 2013	Mount Lemmon	Mount Lemmon Survey	NYS	740 m	MPC · JPL
811974	2002 XY_{122}	—	December 11, 2009	Mount Lemmon	Mount Lemmon Survey	·	820 m	MPC · JPL
811975	2002 XS_{123}	—	October 8, 2012	Catalina	CSS	·	520 m	MPC · JPL
811976	2002 XW_{123}	—	March 1, 2011	Mount Lemmon	Mount Lemmon Survey	·	710 m	MPC · JPL
811977	2003 BA_{23}	—	January 25, 2003	Palomar	NEAT	·	2.0 km	MPC · JPL
811978	2003 BD_{98}	—	December 18, 2009	Mount Lemmon	Mount Lemmon Survey	NYS	900 m	MPC · JPL
811979	2003 BJ_{98}	—	April 19, 2007	Kitt Peak	Spacewatch	MAS	510 m	MPC · JPL
811980	2003 BO_{100}	—	June 20, 2015	Haleakala	Pan-STARRS 1	·	860 m	MPC · JPL
811981	2003 BK_{101}	—	January 30, 2003	Kitt Peak	Spacewatch	·	1.4 km	MPC · JPL
811982	2003 BN_{103}	—	January 31, 2003	Kitt Peak	Spacewatch	·	660 m	MPC · JPL
811983	2003 CM_{27}	—	December 12, 2012	Mount Lemmon	Mount Lemmon Survey	·	1.3 km	MPC · JPL
811984	2003 DQ_{25}	—	February 27, 2003	Campo Imperatore	CINEOS	·	1.4 km	MPC · JPL
811985	2003 EP_{56}	—	March 1, 2003	Cerro Tololo	Deep Lens Survey	NYS	620 m	MPC · JPL
811986	2003 FH_{124}	—	March 31, 2003	Kitt Peak	Spacewatch	·	560 m	MPC · JPL
811987	2003 FZ_{135}	—	February 26, 2007	Mount Lemmon	Mount Lemmon Survey	HNS	860 m	MPC · JPL
811988	2003 FS_{136}	—	May 29, 2003	Cerro Tololo	Deep Ecliptic Survey	·	830 m	MPC · JPL
811989	2003 FT_{136}	—	August 27, 2011	Haleakala	Pan-STARRS 1	·	890 m	MPC · JPL
811990	2003 FX_{138}	—	October 15, 2015	Haleakala	Pan-STARRS 1	H	420 m	MPC · JPL
811991	2003 GT_{21}	—	April 7, 2003	Kitt Peak	Spacewatch	H	350 m	MPC · JPL
811992	2003 GA_{34}	—	April 9, 2003	Palomar	NEAT	·	460 m	MPC · JPL
811993	2003 GR_{52}	—	April 3, 2003	Cerro Tololo	Deep Lens Survey	·	470 m	MPC · JPL
811994	2003 GP_{53}	—	April 1, 2003	Cerro Tololo	Deep Lens Survey	·	1.0 km	MPC · JPL
811995	2003 GM_{61}	—	April 8, 2003	Kitt Peak	Spacewatch	·	820 m	MPC · JPL
811996	2003 GS_{63}	—	August 9, 2013	Haleakala	Pan-STARRS 1	·	590 m	MPC · JPL
811997	2003 GU_{63}	—	March 8, 2003	Kitt Peak	Spacewatch	·	900 m	MPC · JPL
811998	2003 HP_{25}	—	April 25, 2003	Kitt Peak	Spacewatch	(5)	950 m	MPC · JPL
811999	2003 HY_{30}	—	March 28, 2014	Mount Lemmon	Mount Lemmon Survey	·	800 m	MPC · JPL
812000	2003 HD_{34}	—	April 7, 2003	Kitt Peak	Spacewatch	·	750 m	MPC · JPL

back to top

== Meaning of names ==
As minor planet discoveries are confirmed, they are given a permanent number by the IAU's Minor Planet Center (MPC), and the discoverers can then submit names for them, following the IAU's naming conventions. The list below concerns those minor planets in the specified number-range that have received names, and explains the meanings of those names.

Official naming citations of newly named small Solar System bodies are approved and published in a bulletin by IAU's Working Group for Small Bodies Nomenclature (WGSBN). Before May 2021, citations were published in MPC's Minor Planet Circulars for many decades. Recent citations can also be found on the JPL Small-Body Database (SBDB). Until his death in 2016, German astronomer Lutz D. Schmadel compiled these citations into the Dictionary of Minor Planet Names (DMP) and regularly updated the collection.

Based on Paul Herget's The Names of the Minor Planets, Schmadel also researched the unclear origin of numerous asteroids, most of which had been named prior to World War II. This article incorporates text from this source, which is in the public domain: SBDB New namings may only be added to this list below after official publication as the preannouncement of names is condemned. The WGSBN publishes a comprehensive guideline for the naming rules of non-cometary small Solar System bodies.

Named minor planet	Provisional	This minor planet was named for...	Ref · Catalog
811110 Ubartas	2021 RR_{130}	Romas Ubartas, Lithuanian discus thrower and Olympic champion.	IAU · 811110
811477 Juravle	2023 HY_{14}	Andrei Juravle, Romanian amateur astronomer from Timișoara, founder of both the Altair astroclub and the Societatea Română de Astronomie Culturală. He has been very active in public outreach, organizing lectures, classes, conferences, pupil camps, stargazing and mass-media events, being also interested in astrophotography and occultations.	IAU · 811477
811529 Kiszelymárta	2023 UV_{14}	Márta Kiszely, Hungarian geophysicist and seismologist.	IAU · 811529
811540 Ernstsalpeter	2023 WA_{29}	Ernst Salpeter, S.J. , Austrian Jesuit astronomer.	IAU · 811540
811935 Robertslobins	2002 SW_{73}	Robert Slobins (b. 1953) is an American freelance photographer.	IAU · 811935
