= List of named minor planets: 800000–899999 =

This is a partial list of named minor planets in numerical order. It contains a total of 668 entries as of 9 November 2026. Minor planets for which no article exist are displayed in grey color and redirect to the list of minor planets (see List of minor planets § Main index).

== From 800,000 to 899,999 ==
- 800113 Zaharydonchev
- 800457 Floriangoebel
- 801007 Stefanpopcot
- 801371 Pocora
- 801684 Pera
- 801733 Maxteodorescu
- 805212 Junkes
- 805997 Wolszczan
- 805998 Yunon
- 807057 Georgescutavi
- 807098 Chensong
- 807579 Yasuhiroyasuko
- 808162 Andrejsērglis
- 808811 Tarczaygyörgy
- 810619 Gaoyu
- 810657 ESOC
- 811110 Ubartas
- 811477 Juravle
- 811529 Kiszelymárta
- 811540 Ernstsalpeter
- 811935 Robertslobins
- 813688 Fongfeifei
- 813826 Vihart
- 814147 Vladturcu
- 814148 Alexandrupop
- 815811 Cześstawikowski
- 817120 Andreirăzvan
- 818660 Capar
- 819712 Tezel
- 819720 Neculairădulescu
- 819915 Anacastañeda
- 822844 Antoniogonzález
- 824655 Funes
- 826505 Xujianlin
- 826631 Frascati
- 826856 Commodorecochran
- 826870 Iancooper
- 826930 Charlottesmall
- 833362 Nida
- 836112 Danieloconnell
- 836275 Pietromaffi
- 836465 Kulmatycki
- 836955 Lais
- 838404 Dickson
- 841529 Jonahwoodhams
- 843293 Tănăselia
- 845241 Zentaalksne
- 846464 Vaižgantas
- 847420 Livtel
- 849224 Motoyama
- 856173 Rozenštrauhs
- 858332 Grischun
- 858334 Gioacchinopecci
- 859641 Vydūnas
- 861969 Elliottsmith
- 864404 Paulmueller
- 864938 Giuseppekoch
- 864997 Józefmaj
- 865364 Daianji
- 868349 Richie
- 868690 Fajardo-Acosta
- 869243 Kuraten
- 870437 Leilani
- 872236 Carlgrillmair
- 875129 Abbeyridgeobs
- 875150 Burkegaffneyobs
- 880193 Sopoćko
- 884759 Compostela
back to top

== See also ==
- List of minor planet discoverers
- List of observatory codes
- Meanings of minor planet names § Index
