= List of minor planets: 807001–808000 =

The following is a partial list of minor planets, running from minor-planet number 807001 through 808000, inclusive. The primary data for this and other partial lists is based on JPL's "Small-Body Orbital Elements" and data available from the Minor Planet Center. Critical list information is also provided by the MPC, unless otherwise specified from Lowell Observatory. A detailed description of the table's columns and additional sources are given on the main page including a complete list of every page in this series, and a statistical break-up on the dynamical classification of minor planets.

Also see the summary list of all named bodies in numerical and alphabetical order, and the corresponding naming citations for the number range of this particular list. New namings may only be added to this list after official publication, as the preannouncement of names is condemned by the Working Group for Small Bodies Nomenclature of the International Astronomical Union.

Near-Earth obj.	MBA (inner)	MBA (outer)	Centaur
Mars-crosser	MBA (middle)	Jupiter trojan	Trans-Neptunian obj.
Unclassified

== 807001–807100 ==
Designation			Discovery			Properties		Ref
Permanent	Provisional	Named after	Date	Site	Discoverer(s)	Category	Diam.	Ref
807001	2017 DO_{46}	—	October 10, 2015	Haleakala	Pan-STARRS 1	·	1.0 km	MPC · JPL
807002	2017 DD_{53}	—	January 27, 2006	Mount Lemmon	Mount Lemmon Survey	EOS	1.5 km	MPC · JPL
807003	2017 DK_{53}	—	January 26, 2006	Kitt Peak	Spacewatch	·	2.0 km	MPC · JPL
807004	2017 DC_{64}	—	April 27, 2012	Haleakala	Pan-STARRS 1	·	2.1 km	MPC · JPL
807005	2017 DD_{64}	—	November 3, 2015	Mount Lemmon	Mount Lemmon Survey	·	2.1 km	MPC · JPL
807006	2017 DO_{66}	—	January 24, 2007	Mount Lemmon	Mount Lemmon Survey	·	1.5 km	MPC · JPL
807007	2017 DH_{70}	—	May 23, 2004	Kitt Peak	Spacewatch	·	1.1 km	MPC · JPL
807008	2017 DH_{82}	—	January 3, 2017	Haleakala	Pan-STARRS 1	H	410 m	MPC · JPL
807009	2017 DQ_{89}	—	January 20, 2017	Haleakala	Pan-STARRS 1	H	420 m	MPC · JPL
807010	2017 DA_{100}	—	January 2, 2017	Haleakala	Pan-STARRS 1	H	440 m	MPC · JPL
807011	2017 DS_{103}	—	April 19, 2004	Socorro	LINEAR	H	480 m	MPC · JPL
807012	2017 DN_{106}	—	February 24, 2017	Mount Lemmon	Mount Lemmon Survey	·	2.2 km	MPC · JPL
807013	2017 DQ_{106}	—	November 13, 2015	Mount Lemmon	Mount Lemmon Survey	·	1.3 km	MPC · JPL
807014	2017 DE_{109}	—	February 4, 2017	Haleakala	Pan-STARRS 1	H	450 m	MPC · JPL
807015	2017 DF_{109}	—	April 9, 2004	Sacramento Peak	SDSS	H	450 m	MPC · JPL
807016	2017 DH_{109}	—	February 16, 2017	Mount Lemmon	Mount Lemmon Survey	H	420 m	MPC · JPL
807017	2017 DA_{116}	—	January 26, 2012	Catalina	CSS	H	550 m	MPC · JPL
807018	2017 DN_{120}	—	April 20, 2009	Mount Lemmon	Mount Lemmon Survey	·	790 m	MPC · JPL
807019	2017 DK_{124}	—	February 25, 2017	Mount Lemmon	Mount Lemmon Survey	·	1.0 km	MPC · JPL
807020	2017 DW_{125}	—	February 21, 2017	Haleakala	Pan-STARRS 1	·	2.3 km	MPC · JPL
807021	2017 DX_{129}	—	February 21, 2017	Haleakala	Pan-STARRS 1	·	860 m	MPC · JPL
807022	2017 DZ_{129}	—	February 24, 2017	Mount Lemmon	Mount Lemmon Survey	EOS	1.2 km	MPC · JPL
807023	2017 DN_{130}	—	February 22, 2017	Haleakala	Pan-STARRS 1	·	1.4 km	MPC · JPL
807024	2017 DM_{131}	—	February 17, 2017	Haleakala	Pan-STARRS 1	·	890 m	MPC · JPL
807025	2017 DN_{132}	—	February 22, 2017	Haleakala	Pan-STARRS 1	·	1.5 km	MPC · JPL
807026	2017 DP_{137}	—	February 26, 2009	Catalina	CSS	·	670 m	MPC · JPL
807027	2017 DR_{137}	—	February 21, 2017	Mount Lemmon	Mount Lemmon Survey	·	880 m	MPC · JPL
807028	2017 DZ_{137}	—	February 22, 2017	Haleakala	Pan-STARRS 1	·	2.1 km	MPC · JPL
807029	2017 DT_{138}	—	February 17, 2017	Haleakala	Pan-STARRS 1	·	970 m	MPC · JPL
807030	2017 DK_{139}	—	February 24, 2017	Haleakala	Pan-STARRS 1	·	1.0 km	MPC · JPL
807031	2017 DA_{141}	—	February 24, 2017	Haleakala	Pan-STARRS 1	TEL	980 m	MPC · JPL
807032	2017 DZ_{141}	—	February 21, 2017	Haleakala	Pan-STARRS 1	·	680 m	MPC · JPL
807033	2017 DS_{146}	—	February 24, 2017	Haleakala	Pan-STARRS 1	EOS	1.2 km	MPC · JPL
807034	2017 DK_{148}	—	January 10, 2006	Mount Lemmon	Mount Lemmon Survey	·	1.4 km	MPC · JPL
807035	2017 DW_{148}	—	February 21, 2017	Haleakala	Pan-STARRS 1	·	1.3 km	MPC · JPL
807036	2017 DY_{148}	—	February 22, 2017	Mount Lemmon	Mount Lemmon Survey	·	1.4 km	MPC · JPL
807037	2017 DY_{153}	—	February 22, 2017	Mount Lemmon	Mount Lemmon Survey	·	1.9 km	MPC · JPL
807038	2017 DT_{155}	—	February 22, 2017	Haleakala	Pan-STARRS 1	·	1.0 km	MPC · JPL
807039	2017 DN_{158}	—	February 21, 2017	Mauna Kea	COIAS	L5	4.5 km	MPC · JPL
807040	2017 EC_{1}	—	January 4, 2017	Haleakala	Pan-STARRS 1	H	440 m	MPC · JPL
807041	2017 EE_{2}	—	January 31, 2006	Kitt Peak	Spacewatch	H	500 m	MPC · JPL
807042	2017 EK_{2}	—	July 23, 2015	Haleakala	Pan-STARRS 1	H	490 m	MPC · JPL
807043	2017 EO_{2}	—	June 27, 2015	Haleakala	Pan-STARRS 2	H	420 m	MPC · JPL
807044	2017 EV_{4}	—	January 3, 2014	Catalina	CSS	H	480 m	MPC · JPL
807045	2017 EP_{10}	—	March 29, 2009	Mount Lemmon	Mount Lemmon Survey	H	410 m	MPC · JPL
807046	2017 EK_{12}	—	January 31, 2011	Westfield	International Astronomical Search Collaboration	·	2.1 km	MPC · JPL
807047	2017 EP_{19}	—	March 16, 2009	Kitt Peak	Spacewatch	H	480 m	MPC · JPL
807048	2017 EP_{23}	—	December 7, 2013	Haleakala	Pan-STARRS 1	H	450 m	MPC · JPL
807049	2017 EB_{29}	—	March 4, 2017	Haleakala	Pan-STARRS 1	MAR	660 m	MPC · JPL
807050	2017 EW_{29}	—	March 4, 2017	Haleakala	Pan-STARRS 1	·	2.0 km	MPC · JPL
807051	2017 EL_{30}	—	March 8, 2017	Mount Lemmon	Mount Lemmon Survey	·	1.2 km	MPC · JPL
807052	2017 EH_{31}	—	March 4, 2017	Haleakala	Pan-STARRS 1	·	1.3 km	MPC · JPL
807053	2017 ER_{31}	—	March 2, 2017	Mount Lemmon	Mount Lemmon Survey	·	810 m	MPC · JPL
807054	2017 EF_{32}	—	March 7, 2017	Haleakala	Pan-STARRS 1	·	1.2 km	MPC · JPL
807055	2017 EG_{32}	—	March 4, 2017	Haleakala	Pan-STARRS 1	KOR	900 m	MPC · JPL
807056	2017 EP_{32}	—	March 5, 2017	Haleakala	Pan-STARRS 1	·	1.4 km	MPC · JPL
807057 Georgescutavi	2017 EY_{32}	Georgescutavi	October 14, 2015	Roque de los Muchachos	EURONEAR	·	850 m	MPC · JPL
807058	2017 EE_{33}	—	March 7, 2017	Haleakala	Pan-STARRS 1	VER	1.8 km	MPC · JPL
807059	2017 ES_{33}	—	March 7, 2017	Mount Lemmon	Mount Lemmon Survey	3:2	4.3 km	MPC · JPL
807060	2017 ET_{33}	—	March 8, 2017	Mount Lemmon	Mount Lemmon Survey	DOR	1.6 km	MPC · JPL
807061	2017 EO_{34}	—	March 8, 2017	Mount Lemmon	Mount Lemmon Survey	EOS	1.3 km	MPC · JPL
807062	2017 EA_{35}	—	March 7, 2017	Haleakala	Pan-STARRS 1	·	2.1 km	MPC · JPL
807063	2017 EP_{36}	—	March 4, 2017	Haleakala	Pan-STARRS 1	THM	1.6 km	MPC · JPL
807064	2017 EB_{37}	—	December 12, 2015	Haleakala	Pan-STARRS 1	·	770 m	MPC · JPL
807065	2017 EB_{38}	—	March 6, 2017	Haleakala	Pan-STARRS 1	·	940 m	MPC · JPL
807066	2017 EL_{38}	—	March 7, 2017	Haleakala	Pan-STARRS 1	MAR	690 m	MPC · JPL
807067	2017 EB_{39}	—	March 4, 2017	Haleakala	Pan-STARRS 1	HNS	600 m	MPC · JPL
807068	2017 ES_{40}	—	March 2, 2017	Mount Lemmon	Mount Lemmon Survey	·	1.2 km	MPC · JPL
807069	2017 EL_{41}	—	March 5, 2017	Haleakala	Pan-STARRS 1	EUN	930 m	MPC · JPL
807070	2017 ER_{41}	—	March 7, 2017	Haleakala	Pan-STARRS 1	·	1.3 km	MPC · JPL
807071	2017 ET_{41}	—	March 4, 2017	Haleakala	Pan-STARRS 1	·	1.3 km	MPC · JPL
807072	2017 ET_{42}	—	March 7, 2017	Haleakala	Pan-STARRS 1	NEM	1.6 km	MPC · JPL
807073	2017 EZ_{45}	—	March 4, 2017	Haleakala	Pan-STARRS 1	·	1.2 km	MPC · JPL
807074	2017 ER_{47}	—	October 3, 2013	Haleakala	Pan-STARRS 1	3:2	4.2 km	MPC · JPL
807075	2017 EF_{49}	—	March 7, 2017	Haleakala	Pan-STARRS 1	AGN	810 m	MPC · JPL
807076	2017 EE_{50}	—	March 4, 2017	Haleakala	Pan-STARRS 1	KOR	1.1 km	MPC · JPL
807077	2017 EA_{55}	—	March 4, 2017	Mount Lemmon	Mount Lemmon Survey	·	800 m	MPC · JPL
807078	2017 EB_{60}	—	March 7, 2017	Haleakala	Pan-STARRS 1	·	1.9 km	MPC · JPL
807079	2017 EP_{60}	—	March 5, 2017	Haleakala	Pan-STARRS 1	·	1.6 km	MPC · JPL
807080	2017 FF_{2}	—	February 26, 2009	Mount Lemmon	Mount Lemmon Survey	H	410 m	MPC · JPL
807081	2017 FK_{2}	—	March 20, 2017	Catalina	CSS	·	1.0 km	MPC · JPL
807082	2017 FY_{3}	—	February 20, 2009	Kitt Peak	Spacewatch	·	710 m	MPC · JPL
807083	2017 FP_{4}	—	March 4, 2017	Haleakala	Pan-STARRS 1	·	1.4 km	MPC · JPL
807084	2017 FQ_{6}	—	March 13, 2013	Mount Lemmon	Mount Lemmon Survey	·	690 m	MPC · JPL
807085	2017 FY_{6}	—	March 28, 2009	Mount Lemmon	Mount Lemmon Survey	·	1 km	MPC · JPL
807086	2017 FG_{25}	—	October 3, 2002	Socorro	LINEAR	H	460 m	MPC · JPL
807087	2017 FT_{25}	—	October 23, 2003	Sacramento Peak	SDSS	MAR	1.0 km	MPC · JPL
807088	2017 FE_{28}	—	February 4, 2017	Haleakala	Pan-STARRS 1	EUN	830 m	MPC · JPL
807089	2017 FV_{40}	—	March 18, 2013	Kitt Peak	Spacewatch	(5)	700 m	MPC · JPL
807090	2017 FE_{54}	—	August 24, 2008	Kitt Peak	Spacewatch	·	1.7 km	MPC · JPL
807091	2017 FC_{55}	—	January 5, 2016	Haleakala	Pan-STARRS 1	T_{j} (2.99) · 3:2	3.8 km	MPC · JPL
807092	2017 FF_{57}	—	July 31, 2014	Haleakala	Pan-STARRS 1	·	1.3 km	MPC · JPL
807093	2017 FJ_{57}	—	October 29, 2014	Haleakala	Pan-STARRS 1	EOS	1.6 km	MPC · JPL
807094	2017 FO_{57}	—	August 20, 2014	Haleakala	Pan-STARRS 1	·	830 m	MPC · JPL
807095	2017 FZ_{58}	—	March 20, 2017	Mount Lemmon	Mount Lemmon Survey	·	780 m	MPC · JPL
807096	2017 FS_{61}	—	January 29, 2011	Mount Lemmon	Mount Lemmon Survey	·	1.3 km	MPC · JPL
807097	2017 FF_{64}	—	July 23, 2015	Haleakala	Pan-STARRS 1	H	490 m	MPC · JPL
807098 Chensong	2017 FJ_{70}	Chensong	March 1, 2017	Xingming	Ruan, J., X. Gao	·	2.0 km	MPC · JPL
807099	2017 FU_{78}	—	February 3, 2017	Haleakala	Pan-STARRS 1	·	960 m	MPC · JPL
807100	2017 FO_{79}	—	February 22, 2017	Mount Lemmon	Mount Lemmon Survey	EOS	1.6 km	MPC · JPL

== 807101–807200 ==
back to top

Designation			Discovery			Properties		Ref
Permanent	Provisional	Named after	Date	Site	Discoverer(s)	Category	Diam.	Ref
807101	2017 FO_{80}	—	November 1, 2015	Mount Lemmon	Mount Lemmon Survey	EUN	730 m	MPC · JPL
807102	2017 FN_{86}	—	March 21, 2017	Haleakala	Pan-STARRS 1	·	790 m	MPC · JPL
807103	2017 FT_{86}	—	March 21, 2017	Haleakala	Pan-STARRS 1	·	1.5 km	MPC · JPL
807104	2017 FO_{88}	—	April 12, 2013	Haleakala	Pan-STARRS 1	·	840 m	MPC · JPL
807105	2017 FB_{90}	—	March 23, 2017	Haleakala	Pan-STARRS 1	·	900 m	MPC · JPL
807106	2017 FB_{91}	—	March 21, 2017	Haleakala	Pan-STARRS 1	·	760 m	MPC · JPL
807107	2017 FH_{92}	—	April 5, 2013	Palomar Mountain	Palomar Transient Factory	·	1.1 km	MPC · JPL
807108	2017 FR_{93}	—	July 19, 2015	Haleakala	Pan-STARRS 1	·	790 m	MPC · JPL
807109	2017 FL_{95}	—	March 10, 2017	Mount Lemmon	Mount Lemmon Survey	H	410 m	MPC · JPL
807110	2017 FE_{102}	—	February 19, 2009	Mount Lemmon	Mount Lemmon Survey	H	410 m	MPC · JPL
807111	2017 FG_{102}	—	March 25, 2017	Mount Lemmon	Mount Lemmon Survey	H	370 m	MPC · JPL
807112	2017 FD_{103}	—	May 3, 2006	Mount Lemmon	Mount Lemmon Survey	H	450 m	MPC · JPL
807113	2017 FN_{110}	—	October 8, 2015	Haleakala	Pan-STARRS 1	·	780 m	MPC · JPL
807114	2017 FL_{116}	—	August 28, 2014	Haleakala	Pan-STARRS 1	·	1.2 km	MPC · JPL
807115	2017 FN_{116}	—	September 20, 2014	Haleakala	Pan-STARRS 1	KOR	990 m	MPC · JPL
807116	2017 FD_{118}	—	March 19, 2017	Haleakala	Pan-STARRS 1	·	810 m	MPC · JPL
807117	2017 FS_{118}	—	March 11, 2008	Mount Lemmon	Mount Lemmon Survey	·	1.1 km	MPC · JPL
807118	2017 FV_{119}	—	January 29, 2012	Mount Lemmon	Mount Lemmon Survey	·	1.3 km	MPC · JPL
807119	2017 FA_{122}	—	September 9, 2007	Mount Lemmon	Mount Lemmon Survey	·	1 km	MPC · JPL
807120	2017 FF_{123}	—	February 9, 2003	Palomar Mountain	NEAT	AEO	920 m	MPC · JPL
807121	2017 FY_{127}	—	February 1, 2017	Haleakala	Pan-STARRS 1	H	490 m	MPC · JPL
807122	2017 FX_{133}	—	March 19, 2017	Haleakala	Pan-STARRS 1	3:2	4.3 km	MPC · JPL
807123	2017 FD_{135}	—	March 26, 2017	Mount Lemmon	Mount Lemmon Survey	·	780 m	MPC · JPL
807124	2017 FO_{135}	—	March 26, 2017	Mount Lemmon	Mount Lemmon Survey	·	2.4 km	MPC · JPL
807125	2017 FM_{137}	—	January 3, 2016	Haleakala	Pan-STARRS 1	3:2 · SHU	3.7 km	MPC · JPL
807126	2017 FE_{144}	—	February 4, 2017	Haleakala	Pan-STARRS 1	·	900 m	MPC · JPL
807127	2017 FA_{145}	—	January 27, 2012	Mount Lemmon	Mount Lemmon Survey	AEO	710 m	MPC · JPL
807128	2017 FJ_{145}	—	March 27, 2017	Haleakala	Pan-STARRS 1	·	1.5 km	MPC · JPL
807129	2017 FU_{146}	—	January 26, 2017	Haleakala	Pan-STARRS 1	H	430 m	MPC · JPL
807130	2017 FG_{147}	—	February 22, 2017	Mount Lemmon	Mount Lemmon Survey	·	1.3 km	MPC · JPL
807131	2017 FN_{148}	—	October 4, 1994	Kitt Peak	Spacewatch	MAR	840 m	MPC · JPL
807132	2017 FP_{150}	—	September 18, 2014	Haleakala	Pan-STARRS 1	·	820 m	MPC · JPL
807133	2017 FY_{150}	—	October 1, 2014	Haleakala	Pan-STARRS 1	·	890 m	MPC · JPL
807134	2017 FZ_{153}	—	January 26, 2017	Haleakala	Pan-STARRS 1	·	790 m	MPC · JPL
807135	2017 FY_{157}	—	October 23, 2011	Haleakala	Pan-STARRS 1	RAF	570 m	MPC · JPL
807136	2017 FL_{158}	—	March 5, 2006	Kitt Peak	Spacewatch	·	1.8 km	MPC · JPL
807137	2017 FH_{160}	—	January 31, 2016	Haleakala	Pan-STARRS 1	·	1.3 km	MPC · JPL
807138	2017 FL_{164}	—	March 31, 2013	Mount Lemmon	Mount Lemmon Survey	·	800 m	MPC · JPL
807139	2017 FS_{164}	—	March 24, 2017	Haleakala	Pan-STARRS 1	·	1.4 km	MPC · JPL
807140	2017 FY_{165}	—	March 19, 2017	Mount Lemmon	Mount Lemmon Survey	·	930 m	MPC · JPL
807141	2017 FH_{167}	—	March 19, 2017	Haleakala	Pan-STARRS 1	·	1.4 km	MPC · JPL
807142	2017 FA_{169}	—	January 1, 2016	Mount Lemmon	Mount Lemmon Survey	EUN	860 m	MPC · JPL
807143	2017 FT_{169}	—	March 20, 2017	Mount Lemmon	Mount Lemmon Survey	HNS	720 m	MPC · JPL
807144	2017 FB_{170}	—	March 19, 2017	Mount Lemmon	Mount Lemmon Survey	·	970 m	MPC · JPL
807145	2017 FC_{170}	—	March 19, 2017	Mount Lemmon	Mount Lemmon Survey	H	320 m	MPC · JPL
807146	2017 FT_{170}	—	March 27, 2017	Haleakala	Pan-STARRS 1	·	1.1 km	MPC · JPL
807147	2017 FA_{171}	—	March 21, 2017	Haleakala	Pan-STARRS 1	·	850 m	MPC · JPL
807148	2017 FH_{173}	—	March 19, 2017	Haleakala	Pan-STARRS 1	EOS	1.1 km	MPC · JPL
807149	2017 FM_{173}	—	March 29, 2017	Haleakala	Pan-STARRS 1	·	1.1 km	MPC · JPL
807150	2017 FT_{175}	—	March 27, 2017	Mount Lemmon	Mount Lemmon Survey	·	1.7 km	MPC · JPL
807151	2017 FO_{176}	—	March 29, 2017	Haleakala	Pan-STARRS 1	·	870 m	MPC · JPL
807152	2017 FA_{177}	—	March 20, 2017	Haleakala	Pan-STARRS 1	PHO	800 m	MPC · JPL
807153	2017 FL_{177}	—	April 21, 2009	Mount Lemmon	Mount Lemmon Survey	3:2	3.4 km	MPC · JPL
807154	2017 FK_{178}	—	March 20, 2017	Mount Lemmon	Mount Lemmon Survey	(1118)	2.3 km	MPC · JPL
807155	2017 FQ_{178}	—	March 17, 2017	Mount Lemmon	Mount Lemmon Survey	·	1.2 km	MPC · JPL
807156	2017 FS_{178}	—	March 20, 2017	Mount Lemmon	Mount Lemmon Survey	·	990 m	MPC · JPL
807157	2017 FV_{178}	—	March 21, 2017	Haleakala	Pan-STARRS 1	·	1.8 km	MPC · JPL
807158	2017 FT_{180}	—	March 27, 2017	Haleakala	Pan-STARRS 1	(5)	690 m	MPC · JPL
807159	2017 FR_{181}	—	March 19, 2017	Haleakala	Pan-STARRS 1	·	1.7 km	MPC · JPL
807160	2017 FN_{183}	—	March 20, 2017	Haleakala	Pan-STARRS 1	·	1.2 km	MPC · JPL
807161	2017 FO_{183}	—	March 21, 2017	Haleakala	Pan-STARRS 1	·	2.2 km	MPC · JPL
807162	2017 FY_{186}	—	February 9, 2008	Kitt Peak	Spacewatch	·	1.0 km	MPC · JPL
807163	2017 FG_{188}	—	March 21, 2017	Haleakala	Pan-STARRS 1	·	980 m	MPC · JPL
807164	2017 FT_{188}	—	March 25, 2017	Mount Lemmon	Mount Lemmon Survey	·	860 m	MPC · JPL
807165	2017 FV_{188}	—	March 20, 2017	Haleakala	Pan-STARRS 1	·	870 m	MPC · JPL
807166	2017 FD_{189}	—	March 19, 2017	Mount Lemmon	Mount Lemmon Survey	·	800 m	MPC · JPL
807167	2017 FL_{190}	—	March 20, 2017	Haleakala	Pan-STARRS 1	·	760 m	MPC · JPL
807168	2017 FW_{191}	—	March 19, 2017	Haleakala	Pan-STARRS 1	MAR	610 m	MPC · JPL
807169	2017 FL_{193}	—	March 19, 2017	Haleakala	Pan-STARRS 1	EUN	810 m	MPC · JPL
807170	2017 FS_{194}	—	March 18, 2017	Mount Lemmon	Mount Lemmon Survey	·	1.2 km	MPC · JPL
807171	2017 FT_{194}	—	March 19, 2017	Mount Lemmon	Mount Lemmon Survey	·	2.0 km	MPC · JPL
807172	2017 FU_{195}	—	March 27, 2017	Mount Lemmon	Mount Lemmon Survey	MAR	740 m	MPC · JPL
807173	2017 FX_{195}	—	March 19, 2017	Haleakala	Pan-STARRS 1	THM	1.6 km	MPC · JPL
807174	2017 FD_{196}	—	March 29, 2017	Haleakala	Pan-STARRS 1	·	1.1 km	MPC · JPL
807175	2017 FY_{196}	—	March 24, 2017	Haleakala	Pan-STARRS 1	·	1.5 km	MPC · JPL
807176	2017 FL_{197}	—	March 25, 2017	Mount Lemmon	Mount Lemmon Survey	·	830 m	MPC · JPL
807177	2017 FP_{199}	—	March 26, 2017	Mount Lemmon	Mount Lemmon Survey	·	2.0 km	MPC · JPL
807178	2017 FB_{201}	—	March 19, 2017	Mount Lemmon	Mount Lemmon Survey	(5)	670 m	MPC · JPL
807179	2017 FM_{201}	—	March 21, 2017	Haleakala	Pan-STARRS 1	·	840 m	MPC · JPL
807180	2017 FK_{203}	—	March 25, 2017	Haleakala	Pan-STARRS 1	·	1.5 km	MPC · JPL
807181	2017 FV_{205}	—	March 29, 2017	Haleakala	Pan-STARRS 1	MAR	620 m	MPC · JPL
807182	2017 FP_{207}	—	March 18, 2017	Haleakala	Pan-STARRS 1	·	1.4 km	MPC · JPL
807183	2017 FW_{207}	—	March 20, 2017	Haleakala	Pan-STARRS 1	EOS	1.3 km	MPC · JPL
807184	2017 FO_{209}	—	March 21, 2017	Haleakala	Pan-STARRS 1	·	1.7 km	MPC · JPL
807185	2017 FH_{210}	—	March 20, 2017	Haleakala	Pan-STARRS 1	·	1.6 km	MPC · JPL
807186	2017 FN_{214}	—	March 19, 2017	Haleakala	Pan-STARRS 1	·	980 m	MPC · JPL
807187	2017 FM_{216}	—	March 18, 2017	Haleakala	Pan-STARRS 1	EUN	710 m	MPC · JPL
807188	2017 FU_{218}	—	March 20, 2017	Haleakala	Pan-STARRS 1	·	2.1 km	MPC · JPL
807189	2017 FN_{220}	—	October 28, 2014	Mount Lemmon	Mount Lemmon Survey	EOS	1.5 km	MPC · JPL
807190	2017 FF_{224}	—	March 25, 2017	Cerro Paranal	Gaia Ground Based Optical Tracking	·	1.3 km	MPC · JPL
807191	2017 FV_{224}	—	March 27, 2017	Haleakala	Pan-STARRS 1	GEF	880 m	MPC · JPL
807192	2017 FX_{249}	—	February 11, 2011	Mount Lemmon	Mount Lemmon Survey	·	1.7 km	MPC · JPL
807193	2017 FX_{253}	—	March 21, 2017	Haleakala	Pan-STARRS 1	·	1.1 km	MPC · JPL
807194	2017 GP	—	March 5, 2017	Mount Lemmon	Mount Lemmon Survey	H	460 m	MPC · JPL
807195	2017 GB_{3}	—	March 16, 2013	Mount Lemmon	Mount Lemmon Survey	·	880 m	MPC · JPL
807196	2017 GE_{3}	—	December 1, 2005	Kitt Peak	L. H. Wasserman, R. L. Millis	·	1.2 km	MPC · JPL
807197	2017 GY_{5}	—	August 5, 2012	Haleakala	Pan-STARRS 1	H	570 m	MPC · JPL
807198	2017 GD_{7}	—	April 2, 2006	Catalina	CSS	H	620 m	MPC · JPL
807199	2017 GW_{7}	—	December 9, 2010	Mount Lemmon	Mount Lemmon Survey	H	620 m	MPC · JPL
807200	2017 GA_{10}	—	August 15, 2013	Haleakala	Pan-STARRS 1	·	1.8 km	MPC · JPL

== 807201–807300 ==
back to top

Designation			Discovery			Properties		Ref
Permanent	Provisional	Named after	Date	Site	Discoverer(s)	Category	Diam.	Ref
807201	2017 GS_{10}	—	December 1, 2015	Haleakala	Pan-STARRS 1	·	990 m	MPC · JPL
807202	2017 GF_{11}	—	April 6, 2017	Haleakala	Pan-STARRS 1	·	1.1 km	MPC · JPL
807203	2017 GN_{11}	—	February 25, 2017	Mount Lemmon	Mount Lemmon Survey	·	1.4 km	MPC · JPL
807204	2017 GU_{11}	—	April 3, 2017	Mount Lemmon	Mount Lemmon Survey	EUN	810 m	MPC · JPL
807205	2017 GE_{12}	—	April 6, 2017	Mount Lemmon	Mount Lemmon Survey	·	1.2 km	MPC · JPL
807206	2017 GX_{14}	—	April 1, 2017	Haleakala	Pan-STARRS 1	·	1.0 km	MPC · JPL
807207	2017 GY_{15}	—	April 3, 2017	Haleakala	Pan-STARRS 1	·	700 m	MPC · JPL
807208	2017 GZ_{15}	—	April 1, 2017	Haleakala	Pan-STARRS 1	·	1.1 km	MPC · JPL
807209	2017 GO_{16}	—	April 3, 2017	Haleakala	Pan-STARRS 1	EOS	1.3 km	MPC · JPL
807210	2017 GV_{16}	—	April 6, 2017	Haleakala	Pan-STARRS 1	·	780 m	MPC · JPL
807211	2017 GY_{16}	—	April 4, 2017	Haleakala	Pan-STARRS 1	·	1.1 km	MPC · JPL
807212	2017 GA_{17}	—	March 29, 2017	Haleakala	Pan-STARRS 1	·	1.9 km	MPC · JPL
807213	2017 GJ_{18}	—	April 3, 2017	Haleakala	Pan-STARRS 1	EOS	1.2 km	MPC · JPL
807214	2017 GV_{19}	—	April 6, 2017	Mount Lemmon	Mount Lemmon Survey	·	2.2 km	MPC · JPL
807215	2017 GW_{19}	—	April 1, 2017	Haleakala	Pan-STARRS 1	·	850 m	MPC · JPL
807216	2017 GM_{20}	—	February 28, 2008	Mount Lemmon	Mount Lemmon Survey	·	970 m	MPC · JPL
807217	2017 GP_{20}	—	April 1, 2017	Haleakala	Pan-STARRS 1	EUN	710 m	MPC · JPL
807218	2017 GQ_{20}	—	April 4, 2017	Haleakala	Pan-STARRS 1	JUN	910 m	MPC · JPL
807219	2017 GU_{20}	—	April 6, 2017	Mount Lemmon	Mount Lemmon Survey	·	810 m	MPC · JPL
807220	2017 GZ_{20}	—	April 7, 2017	Haleakala	Pan-STARRS 1	MAR	780 m	MPC · JPL
807221	2017 GB_{21}	—	April 3, 2017	Mount Lemmon	Mount Lemmon Survey	EUN	690 m	MPC · JPL
807222	2017 GL_{21}	—	April 1, 2017	Haleakala	Pan-STARRS 1	·	1.4 km	MPC · JPL
807223	2017 GP_{21}	—	April 1, 2017	Haleakala	Pan-STARRS 1	·	900 m	MPC · JPL
807224	2017 GC_{22}	—	April 5, 2017	Haleakala	Pan-STARRS 1	AGN	850 m	MPC · JPL
807225	2017 GA_{23}	—	April 1, 2017	Haleakala	Pan-STARRS 1	·	900 m	MPC · JPL
807226	2017 GL_{23}	—	April 6, 2017	Haleakala	Pan-STARRS 1	·	2.1 km	MPC · JPL
807227	2017 GV_{23}	—	April 3, 2017	Haleakala	Pan-STARRS 1	(260)	2.4 km	MPC · JPL
807228	2017 GO_{25}	—	April 2, 2017	Haleakala	Pan-STARRS 1	MRX	630 m	MPC · JPL
807229	2017 GA_{31}	—	April 6, 2017	Haleakala	Pan-STARRS 1	·	1.2 km	MPC · JPL
807230	2017 GQ_{31}	—	October 28, 2014	Haleakala	Pan-STARRS 1	·	1.5 km	MPC · JPL
807231	2017 HM_{1}	—	September 10, 2015	Haleakala	Pan-STARRS 1	H	370 m	MPC · JPL
807232	2017 HY_{1}	—	February 25, 2017	Mount Lemmon	Mount Lemmon Survey	·	1.1 km	MPC · JPL
807233	2017 HL_{2}	—	December 24, 2005	Kitt Peak	Spacewatch	H	440 m	MPC · JPL
807234	2017 HR_{2}	—	March 21, 2017	Mount Lemmon	Mount Lemmon Survey	H	470 m	MPC · JPL
807235	2017 HS_{2}	—	April 6, 2017	Haleakala	Pan-STARRS 1	H	540 m	MPC · JPL
807236	2017 HO_{8}	—	August 25, 2014	Haleakala	Pan-STARRS 1	·	1.5 km	MPC · JPL
807237	2017 HG_{11}	—	April 6, 2017	Mount Lemmon	Mount Lemmon Survey	·	690 m	MPC · JPL
807238	2017 HA_{21}	—	April 6, 2017	Mount Lemmon	Mount Lemmon Survey	·	1.1 km	MPC · JPL
807239	2017 HC_{22}	—	February 1, 2016	Haleakala	Pan-STARRS 1	·	1.9 km	MPC · JPL
807240	2017 HF_{22}	—	September 18, 2015	Catalina	CSS	H	530 m	MPC · JPL
807241	2017 HA_{24}	—	February 2, 2017	Haleakala	Pan-STARRS 1	·	920 m	MPC · JPL
807242	2017 HY_{25}	—	October 22, 2014	Mount Lemmon	Mount Lemmon Survey	HOF	1.9 km	MPC · JPL
807243	2017 HF_{28}	—	January 2, 2011	Mount Lemmon	Mount Lemmon Survey	·	940 m	MPC · JPL
807244	2017 HN_{28}	—	April 25, 2017	Haleakala	Pan-STARRS 1	·	900 m	MPC · JPL
807245	2017 HP_{30}	—	April 25, 2017	Haleakala	Pan-STARRS 1	·	1.5 km	MPC · JPL
807246	2017 HP_{37}	—	April 26, 2017	Haleakala	Pan-STARRS 1	·	1.1 km	MPC · JPL
807247	2017 HC_{38}	—	April 26, 2017	Haleakala	Pan-STARRS 1	(5)	750 m	MPC · JPL
807248	2017 HS_{39}	—	March 24, 2006	Mount Lemmon	Mount Lemmon Survey	THM	1.7 km	MPC · JPL
807249	2017 HR_{44}	—	April 27, 2017	Haleakala	Pan-STARRS 1	·	730 m	MPC · JPL
807250	2017 HG_{45}	—	March 6, 2011	Mount Lemmon	Mount Lemmon Survey	·	1.9 km	MPC · JPL
807251	2017 HA_{47}	—	March 23, 2017	Haleakala	Pan-STARRS 1	·	860 m	MPC · JPL
807252	2017 HV_{50}	—	April 7, 2017	Mount Lemmon	Mount Lemmon Survey	·	1.0 km	MPC · JPL
807253	2017 HY_{51}	—	April 27, 2017	Haleakala	Pan-STARRS 1	·	750 m	MPC · JPL
807254	2017 HA_{64}	—	April 19, 2017	Mount Lemmon	Mount Lemmon Survey	·	690 m	MPC · JPL
807255	2017 HN_{64}	—	April 18, 2017	Mount Lemmon	Mount Lemmon Survey	H	530 m	MPC · JPL
807256	2017 HR_{64}	—	April 26, 2017	Haleakala	Pan-STARRS 1	JUN	860 m	MPC · JPL
807257	2017 HN_{66}	—	April 27, 2017	Haleakala	Pan-STARRS 1	·	1.2 km	MPC · JPL
807258	2017 HV_{66}	—	April 27, 2017	Haleakala	Pan-STARRS 1	EUN	790 m	MPC · JPL
807259	2017 HF_{67}	—	April 26, 2017	Haleakala	Pan-STARRS 1	RAF	660 m	MPC · JPL
807260	2017 HH_{69}	—	April 26, 2017	Haleakala	Pan-STARRS 1	EOS	1.3 km	MPC · JPL
807261	2017 HQ_{69}	—	April 20, 2017	Haleakala	Pan-STARRS 1	·	1.1 km	MPC · JPL
807262	2017 HU_{69}	—	April 26, 2017	Haleakala	Pan-STARRS 1	·	870 m	MPC · JPL
807263	2017 HW_{69}	—	April 18, 2017	Mount Lemmon	Mount Lemmon Survey	H	420 m	MPC · JPL
807264	2017 HK_{70}	—	April 26, 2017	Haleakala	Pan-STARRS 1	·	1.0 km	MPC · JPL
807265	2017 HU_{70}	—	April 25, 2017	Haleakala	Pan-STARRS 1	·	970 m	MPC · JPL
807266	2017 HV_{70}	—	April 16, 2017	Mount Lemmon	Mount Lemmon Survey	KON	1.8 km	MPC · JPL
807267	2017 HD_{72}	—	April 20, 2017	Haleakala	Pan-STARRS 1	·	1.9 km	MPC · JPL
807268	2017 HA_{73}	—	April 26, 2017	Haleakala	Pan-STARRS 1	L4	6.3 km	MPC · JPL
807269	2017 HQ_{73}	—	April 25, 2017	Haleakala	Pan-STARRS 1	·	1.4 km	MPC · JPL
807270	2017 HU_{73}	—	April 19, 2017	Mount Lemmon	Mount Lemmon Survey	·	700 m	MPC · JPL
807271	2017 HW_{73}	—	April 19, 2017	Mount Lemmon	Mount Lemmon Survey	HYG	1.9 km	MPC · JPL
807272	2017 HU_{74}	—	April 22, 2017	Mount Lemmon	Mount Lemmon Survey	EUN	770 m	MPC · JPL
807273	2017 HX_{74}	—	April 23, 2017	Mount Lemmon	Mount Lemmon Survey	BAR	620 m	MPC · JPL
807274	2017 HA_{75}	—	April 23, 2017	Kitt Peak	Spacewatch	·	910 m	MPC · JPL
807275	2017 HJ_{75}	—	April 26, 2017	Haleakala	Pan-STARRS 1	(194)	1.0 km	MPC · JPL
807276	2017 HN_{75}	—	April 26, 2017	Haleakala	Pan-STARRS 1	·	750 m	MPC · JPL
807277	2017 HP_{75}	—	April 26, 2017	Haleakala	Pan-STARRS 1	·	880 m	MPC · JPL
807278	2017 HH_{76}	—	April 27, 2017	Haleakala	Pan-STARRS 1	EUN	880 m	MPC · JPL
807279	2017 HC_{77}	—	April 25, 2017	Haleakala	Pan-STARRS 1	·	1.1 km	MPC · JPL
807280	2017 HE_{77}	—	April 26, 2017	Haleakala	Pan-STARRS 1	·	1.1 km	MPC · JPL
807281	2017 HL_{77}	—	December 6, 2015	Haleakala	Pan-STARRS 1	·	680 m	MPC · JPL
807282	2017 HM_{77}	—	April 20, 2017	Haleakala	Pan-STARRS 1	·	1.6 km	MPC · JPL
807283	2017 HR_{77}	—	April 28, 2017	Haleakala	Pan-STARRS 1	·	860 m	MPC · JPL
807284	2017 HT_{77}	—	April 27, 2017	Haleakala	Pan-STARRS 1	EUN	690 m	MPC · JPL
807285	2017 HD_{78}	—	April 27, 2017	Haleakala	Pan-STARRS 1	HNS	740 m	MPC · JPL
807286	2017 HO_{78}	—	April 27, 2017	Haleakala	Pan-STARRS 1	·	740 m	MPC · JPL
807287	2017 HX_{78}	—	April 20, 2017	Mount Lemmon	Mount Lemmon Survey	·	800 m	MPC · JPL
807288	2017 HY_{78}	—	April 27, 2017	Haleakala	Pan-STARRS 1	·	1.1 km	MPC · JPL
807289	2017 HL_{79}	—	April 26, 2017	Haleakala	Pan-STARRS 1	·	1.2 km	MPC · JPL
807290	2017 HV_{79}	—	April 27, 2017	Haleakala	Pan-STARRS 1	KRM	1.3 km	MPC · JPL
807291	2017 HD_{82}	—	April 26, 2017	Haleakala	Pan-STARRS 1	·	1.6 km	MPC · JPL
807292	2017 HE_{83}	—	April 27, 2017	Haleakala	Pan-STARRS 1	·	940 m	MPC · JPL
807293	2017 HH_{83}	—	April 28, 2017	Haleakala	Pan-STARRS 1	·	1.2 km	MPC · JPL
807294	2017 HJ_{83}	—	April 25, 2017	Haleakala	Pan-STARRS 1	·	2.3 km	MPC · JPL
807295	2017 HO_{83}	—	April 20, 2017	Haleakala	Pan-STARRS 1	·	1.3 km	MPC · JPL
807296	2017 HB_{84}	—	April 20, 2017	Haleakala	Pan-STARRS 1	·	1.5 km	MPC · JPL
807297	2017 HO_{86}	—	April 27, 2017	Haleakala	Pan-STARRS 1	·	900 m	MPC · JPL
807298	2017 HP_{86}	—	April 20, 2017	Haleakala	Pan-STARRS 1	·	1.1 km	MPC · JPL
807299	2017 HY_{86}	—	April 26, 2017	Haleakala	Pan-STARRS 1	EUN	670 m	MPC · JPL
807300	2017 HC_{87}	—	April 25, 2017	Haleakala	Pan-STARRS 1	EUN	880 m	MPC · JPL

== 807301–807400 ==
back to top

Designation			Discovery			Properties		Ref
Permanent	Provisional	Named after	Date	Site	Discoverer(s)	Category	Diam.	Ref
807301	2017 HT_{88}	—	April 26, 2017	Haleakala	Pan-STARRS 1	·	2.2 km	MPC · JPL
807302	2017 HW_{88}	—	April 26, 2017	Haleakala	Pan-STARRS 1	·	2.4 km	MPC · JPL
807303	2017 HC_{91}	—	March 27, 2017	Haleakala	Pan-STARRS 1	·	1.3 km	MPC · JPL
807304	2017 HR_{93}	—	April 26, 2017	Haleakala	Pan-STARRS 1	·	1.3 km	MPC · JPL
807305	2017 HF_{95}	—	April 20, 2017	Haleakala	Pan-STARRS 1	·	1.7 km	MPC · JPL
807306	2017 HB_{96}	—	April 27, 2017	Haleakala	Pan-STARRS 1	·	990 m	MPC · JPL
807307	2017 HH_{98}	—	April 27, 2017	Haleakala	Pan-STARRS 1	(5)	860 m	MPC · JPL
807308	2017 HL_{98}	—	April 25, 2017	Haleakala	Pan-STARRS 1	·	950 m	MPC · JPL
807309	2017 HP_{99}	—	April 27, 2012	Haleakala	Pan-STARRS 1	·	1.4 km	MPC · JPL
807310	2017 HQ_{100}	—	April 20, 2017	Haleakala	Pan-STARRS 1	·	2.3 km	MPC · JPL
807311	2017 HO_{102}	—	April 25, 2017	Haleakala	Pan-STARRS 1	·	2.1 km	MPC · JPL
807312	2017 HT_{102}	—	April 20, 2017	Haleakala	Pan-STARRS 1	·	1.5 km	MPC · JPL
807313	2017 HY_{102}	—	April 20, 2017	Haleakala	Pan-STARRS 1	·	1.2 km	MPC · JPL
807314	2017 HO_{103}	—	October 10, 2004	Kitt Peak	Deep Ecliptic Survey	·	1.2 km	MPC · JPL
807315	2017 HT_{103}	—	November 17, 2014	Mount Lemmon	Mount Lemmon Survey	·	1.3 km	MPC · JPL
807316	2017 HR_{104}	—	April 30, 2017	Mount Lemmon	Mount Lemmon Survey	·	1.6 km	MPC · JPL
807317	2017 HX_{104}	—	April 20, 2017	Haleakala	Pan-STARRS 1	·	920 m	MPC · JPL
807318	2017 HF_{105}	—	September 20, 2014	Haleakala	Pan-STARRS 1	·	850 m	MPC · JPL
807319	2017 HK_{105}	—	April 20, 2017	Haleakala	Pan-STARRS 1	·	750 m	MPC · JPL
807320	2017 HS_{105}	—	April 27, 2017	Haleakala	Pan-STARRS 1	·	1.2 km	MPC · JPL
807321	2017 HJ_{106}	—	April 26, 2017	Haleakala	Pan-STARRS 1	·	1.2 km	MPC · JPL
807322	2017 HL_{115}	—	April 25, 2017	Haleakala	Pan-STARRS 1	·	1.9 km	MPC · JPL
807323	2017 HO_{115}	—	January 13, 2015	Haleakala	Pan-STARRS 1	·	2.3 km	MPC · JPL
807324	2017 JP	—	April 27, 2017	Haleakala	Pan-STARRS 1	·	1.1 km	MPC · JPL
807325	2017 JX_{2}	—	May 15, 2004	Socorro	LINEAR	·	1.3 km	MPC · JPL
807326	2017 JW_{5}	—	January 2, 2016	Haleakala	Pan-STARRS 1	·	2.4 km	MPC · JPL
807327	2017 JQ_{6}	—	May 4, 2017	Haleakala	Pan-STARRS 1	·	990 m	MPC · JPL
807328	2017 JA_{7}	—	May 6, 2017	Haleakala	Pan-STARRS 1	·	1.1 km	MPC · JPL
807329	2017 JE_{8}	—	May 6, 2017	Haleakala	Pan-STARRS 1	·	850 m	MPC · JPL
807330	2017 JQ_{8}	—	May 4, 2017	Haleakala	Pan-STARRS 1	·	1.3 km	MPC · JPL
807331	2017 JA_{9}	—	May 4, 2017	Haleakala	Pan-STARRS 1	·	760 m	MPC · JPL
807332	2017 JC_{9}	—	May 4, 2017	Haleakala	Pan-STARRS 1	EUN	760 m	MPC · JPL
807333	2017 JT_{9}	—	May 5, 2017	Mount Lemmon	Mount Lemmon Survey	·	970 m	MPC · JPL
807334	2017 JB_{11}	—	September 20, 2014	Haleakala	Pan-STARRS 1	·	840 m	MPC · JPL
807335	2017 JV_{11}	—	March 17, 2012	Mount Lemmon	Mount Lemmon Survey	·	1.5 km	MPC · JPL
807336	2017 JQ_{13}	—	January 20, 2015	Haleakala	Pan-STARRS 1	·	2.1 km	MPC · JPL
807337	2017 KR_{1}	—	May 16, 2013	Haleakala	Pan-STARRS 1	·	1.1 km	MPC · JPL
807338	2017 KW_{1}	—	May 16, 2013	Haleakala	Pan-STARRS 1	·	950 m	MPC · JPL
807339	2017 KN_{6}	—	April 16, 2013	Haleakala	Pan-STARRS 1	·	850 m	MPC · JPL
807340	2017 KU_{6}	—	March 24, 2017	Haleakala	Pan-STARRS 1	·	930 m	MPC · JPL
807341	2017 KJ_{8}	—	April 26, 2017	Haleakala	Pan-STARRS 1	EUN	940 m	MPC · JPL
807342	2017 KU_{8}	—	June 1, 2013	Nogales	M. Schwartz, P. R. Holvorcem	·	720 m	MPC · JPL
807343	2017 KD_{12}	—	May 4, 2017	Haleakala	Pan-STARRS 1	EUN	780 m	MPC · JPL
807344	2017 KP_{12}	—	January 14, 2016	Haleakala	Pan-STARRS 1	JUN	840 m	MPC · JPL
807345	2017 KP_{14}	—	April 25, 2017	Haleakala	Pan-STARRS 1	EOS	1.3 km	MPC · JPL
807346	2017 KR_{14}	—	November 14, 2015	Mount Lemmon	Mount Lemmon Survey	(5)	920 m	MPC · JPL
807347	2017 KM_{15}	—	April 4, 2017	Haleakala	Pan-STARRS 1	·	870 m	MPC · JPL
807348	2017 KR_{15}	—	May 4, 2017	Mount Lemmon	Mount Lemmon Survey	·	1.1 km	MPC · JPL
807349	2017 KO_{16}	—	November 17, 2014	Haleakala	Pan-STARRS 1	(5)	910 m	MPC · JPL
807350	2017 KO_{20}	—	May 18, 2017	Haleakala	Pan-STARRS 1	·	1.2 km	MPC · JPL
807351	2017 KW_{21}	—	February 5, 2016	Haleakala	Pan-STARRS 1	·	1.0 km	MPC · JPL
807352	2017 KN_{23}	—	May 19, 2017	Haleakala	Pan-STARRS 1	·	1.1 km	MPC · JPL
807353	2017 KO_{26}	—	February 6, 2016	Haleakala	Pan-STARRS 1	VER	2.0 km	MPC · JPL
807354	2017 KJ_{28}	—	February 4, 2016	Haleakala	Pan-STARRS 1	·	2.4 km	MPC · JPL
807355	2017 KK_{28}	—	May 19, 2017	Mount Lemmon	Mount Lemmon Survey	·	1.3 km	MPC · JPL
807356	2017 KL_{28}	—	May 19, 2017	Mount Lemmon	Mount Lemmon Survey	(1547)	1.2 km	MPC · JPL
807357	2017 KW_{28}	—	January 29, 2015	Haleakala	Pan-STARRS 1	·	2.9 km	MPC · JPL
807358	2017 KB_{30}	—	April 25, 2017	Haleakala	Pan-STARRS 1	·	990 m	MPC · JPL
807359	2017 KF_{32}	—	September 23, 2015	Haleakala	Pan-STARRS 1	H	460 m	MPC · JPL
807360	2017 KR_{36}	—	October 7, 2005	Mount Lemmon	Mount Lemmon Survey	·	1 km	MPC · JPL
807361	2017 KY_{36}	—	April 2, 2006	Kitt Peak	Spacewatch	·	1.6 km	MPC · JPL
807362	2017 KX_{37}	—	May 17, 2017	Mount Lemmon	Mount Lemmon Survey	·	1.0 km	MPC · JPL
807363	2017 KJ_{38}	—	August 14, 2013	Haleakala	Pan-STARRS 1	·	1.5 km	MPC · JPL
807364	2017 KL_{38}	—	May 26, 2017	Haleakala	Pan-STARRS 1	·	2.1 km	MPC · JPL
807365	2017 KU_{38}	—	May 26, 2017	Haleakala	Pan-STARRS 1	·	2.4 km	MPC · JPL
807366	2017 KP_{40}	—	May 19, 2017	Mount Lemmon	Mount Lemmon Survey	·	910 m	MPC · JPL
807367	2017 KU_{40}	—	May 22, 2017	Haleakala	Pan-STARRS 1	·	870 m	MPC · JPL
807368	2017 KV_{40}	—	May 18, 2017	Haleakala	Pan-STARRS 1	·	930 m	MPC · JPL
807369	2017 KZ_{40}	—	May 17, 2017	Haleakala	Pan-STARRS 1	MAR	710 m	MPC · JPL
807370	2017 KK_{41}	—	May 24, 2017	Haleakala	Pan-STARRS 1	KON	1.8 km	MPC · JPL
807371	2017 KL_{41}	—	May 24, 2017	ESA OGS	ESA OGS	·	1.1 km	MPC · JPL
807372	2017 KO_{41}	—	May 21, 2017	Haleakala	Pan-STARRS 1	·	710 m	MPC · JPL
807373	2017 KP_{41}	—	May 27, 2017	Haleakala	Pan-STARRS 1	BRG	1.0 km	MPC · JPL
807374	2017 KS_{41}	—	May 21, 2017	Haleakala	Pan-STARRS 1	·	820 m	MPC · JPL
807375	2017 KU_{41}	—	May 26, 2017	Haleakala	Pan-STARRS 1	·	860 m	MPC · JPL
807376	2017 KX_{41}	—	May 26, 2017	ESA OGS	ESA OGS	KRM	1.4 km	MPC · JPL
807377	2017 KA_{42}	—	May 22, 2017	Mount Lemmon	Mount Lemmon Survey	·	1.1 km	MPC · JPL
807378	2017 KB_{42}	—	May 29, 2017	Mount Lemmon	Mount Lemmon Survey	·	900 m	MPC · JPL
807379	2017 KG_{42}	—	May 27, 2017	Haleakala	Pan-STARRS 1	BAR	730 m	MPC · JPL
807380	2017 KH_{42}	—	May 21, 2017	Haleakala	Pan-STARRS 1	·	1.0 km	MPC · JPL
807381	2017 KA_{47}	—	May 26, 2017	Haleakala	Pan-STARRS 1	·	2.6 km	MPC · JPL
807382	2017 KU_{48}	—	May 22, 2017	Mount Lemmon	Mount Lemmon Survey	EUN	860 m	MPC · JPL
807383	2017 KN_{50}	—	May 24, 2017	Mount Lemmon	Mount Lemmon Survey	·	2.2 km	MPC · JPL
807384	2017 KC_{53}	—	May 18, 2017	Haleakala	Pan-STARRS 1	·	1.8 km	MPC · JPL
807385	2017 LH_{2}	—	June 4, 2017	Mount Lemmon	Mount Lemmon Survey	·	1.2 km	MPC · JPL
807386	2017 LA_{3}	—	June 15, 2017	Mount Lemmon	Mount Lemmon Survey	·	820 m	MPC · JPL
807387	2017 LK_{3}	—	March 28, 2016	Cerro Tololo	DECam	·	1.2 km	MPC · JPL
807388	2017 LN_{4}	—	June 2, 2017	Cerro Tololo	M. Micheli, F. Valdes	·	1.2 km	MPC · JPL
807389	2017 MK_{1}	—	March 1, 2004	Nogales	P. R. Holvorcem, M. Schwartz	·	870 m	MPC · JPL
807390	2017 MP_{1}	—	September 15, 2013	Haleakala	Pan-STARRS 1	·	1.0 km	MPC · JPL
807391	2017 MV_{1}	—	March 27, 2008	Mount Lemmon	Mount Lemmon Survey	EUN	730 m	MPC · JPL
807392	2017 MB_{2}	—	February 29, 2016	Haleakala	Pan-STARRS 1	·	2.1 km	MPC · JPL
807393	2017 MX_{4}	—	June 23, 2017	Haleakala	Pan-STARRS 1	AMO	240 m	MPC · JPL
807394	2017 MH_{8}	—	May 29, 2000	Kitt Peak	Spacewatch	·	990 m	MPC · JPL
807395	2017 MG_{9}	—	September 22, 2009	Kitt Peak	Spacewatch	BAR	860 m	MPC · JPL
807396	2017 MW_{9}	—	June 17, 2004	Kitt Peak	Spacewatch	·	930 m	MPC · JPL
807397	2017 MB_{12}	—	June 27, 2017	Mount Lemmon	Mount Lemmon Survey	·	1.5 km	MPC · JPL
807398	2017 MD_{12}	—	June 25, 2017	Haleakala	Pan-STARRS 1	·	1.2 km	MPC · JPL
807399	2017 MN_{12}	—	June 25, 2017	Haleakala	Pan-STARRS 1	·	1.1 km	MPC · JPL
807400	2017 MA_{14}	—	June 25, 2017	Haleakala	Pan-STARRS 1	·	730 m	MPC · JPL

== 807401–807500 ==
back to top

Designation			Discovery			Properties		Ref
Permanent	Provisional	Named after	Date	Site	Discoverer(s)	Category	Diam.	Ref
807401	2017 MB_{14}	—	June 24, 2017	Haleakala	Pan-STARRS 1	·	2.4 km	MPC · JPL
807402	2017 MX_{14}	—	June 23, 2017	Haleakala	Pan-STARRS 1	·	1.5 km	MPC · JPL
807403	2017 MS_{15}	—	June 25, 2017	Haleakala	Pan-STARRS 1	AGN	810 m	MPC · JPL
807404	2017 MQ_{16}	—	May 1, 2016	Cerro Tololo	DECam	EOS	1.3 km	MPC · JPL
807405	2017 MB_{18}	—	June 21, 2017	Haleakala	Pan-STARRS 1	·	930 m	MPC · JPL
807406	2017 MN_{18}	—	April 2, 2016	Haleakala	Pan-STARRS 1	·	1.5 km	MPC · JPL
807407	2017 MQ_{18}	—	June 24, 2017	Haleakala	Pan-STARRS 1	·	770 m	MPC · JPL
807408	2017 MT_{18}	—	June 21, 2017	Haleakala	Pan-STARRS 1	·	930 m	MPC · JPL
807409	2017 MF_{19}	—	June 22, 2017	Haleakala	Pan-STARRS 1	JUN	590 m	MPC · JPL
807410	2017 MH_{19}	—	June 21, 2017	Haleakala	Pan-STARRS 1	·	1.2 km	MPC · JPL
807411	2017 MK_{19}	—	June 20, 2017	Haleakala	Pan-STARRS 1	·	1.1 km	MPC · JPL
807412	2017 ML_{19}	—	June 24, 2017	Haleakala	Pan-STARRS 1	·	1.0 km	MPC · JPL
807413	2017 MP_{19}	—	June 23, 2017	Haleakala	Pan-STARRS 1	·	1.2 km	MPC · JPL
807414	2017 MV_{19}	—	June 21, 2017	Haleakala	Pan-STARRS 1	·	1.1 km	MPC · JPL
807415	2017 MC_{20}	—	June 24, 2017	Haleakala	Pan-STARRS 1	·	1 km	MPC · JPL
807416	2017 MH_{20}	—	June 20, 2017	Haleakala	Pan-STARRS 1	·	1.2 km	MPC · JPL
807417	2017 MK_{20}	—	June 19, 2017	Mount Lemmon	Mount Lemmon Survey	·	960 m	MPC · JPL
807418	2017 MR_{20}	—	June 26, 2017	Mount Lemmon	Mount Lemmon Survey	·	1.2 km	MPC · JPL
807419	2017 MZ_{20}	—	June 25, 2017	Haleakala	Pan-STARRS 1	·	2.1 km	MPC · JPL
807420	2017 MR_{22}	—	January 25, 2015	Haleakala	Pan-STARRS 1	·	2.5 km	MPC · JPL
807421	2017 MF_{24}	—	March 7, 2016	Haleakala	Pan-STARRS 1	·	1.3 km	MPC · JPL
807422	2017 MH_{25}	—	June 25, 2017	Haleakala	Pan-STARRS 1	·	1.1 km	MPC · JPL
807423	2017 MU_{25}	—	June 29, 2017	Mount Lemmon	Mount Lemmon Survey	·	1.8 km	MPC · JPL
807424	2017 MJ_{26}	—	May 23, 2012	Mount Lemmon	Mount Lemmon Survey	·	1.2 km	MPC · JPL
807425	2017 ML_{26}	—	June 23, 2017	Haleakala	Pan-STARRS 1	·	1.3 km	MPC · JPL
807426	2017 MO_{26}	—	June 24, 2017	Haleakala	Pan-STARRS 1	MAR	800 m	MPC · JPL
807427	2017 MF_{30}	—	June 24, 2017	Haleakala	Pan-STARRS 1	·	1.3 km	MPC · JPL
807428	2017 MN_{31}	—	June 24, 2017	Haleakala	Pan-STARRS 1	·	1.1 km	MPC · JPL
807429	2017 MB_{32}	—	January 19, 2015	Haleakala	Pan-STARRS 1	·	1.6 km	MPC · JPL
807430	2017 MF_{32}	—	June 22, 2017	Haleakala	Pan-STARRS 1	·	1.2 km	MPC · JPL
807431	2017 MH_{32}	—	October 18, 2009	Mount Lemmon	Mount Lemmon Survey	(7744)	990 m	MPC · JPL
807432	2017 MD_{34}	—	June 24, 2017	Haleakala	Pan-STARRS 1	·	2.2 km	MPC · JPL
807433	2017 MJ_{35}	—	June 25, 2017	Haleakala	Pan-STARRS 1	(1118)	2.1 km	MPC · JPL
807434	2017 MJ_{36}	—	June 24, 2017	Haleakala	Pan-STARRS 1	·	1.9 km	MPC · JPL
807435	2017 MT_{41}	—	January 20, 2015	Haleakala	Pan-STARRS 1	·	2.2 km	MPC · JPL
807436	2017 NT_{1}	—	June 26, 2017	Mount Lemmon	Mount Lemmon Survey	·	1.6 km	MPC · JPL
807437	2017 NO_{7}	—	July 15, 2017	Haleakala	Pan-STARRS 1	·	2.6 km	MPC · JPL
807438	2017 NM_{8}	—	July 3, 2017	Kitt Peak	Spacewatch	EUN	880 m	MPC · JPL
807439	2017 NZ_{11}	—	July 5, 2017	Haleakala	Pan-STARRS 1	·	2.1 km	MPC · JPL
807440	2017 NN_{12}	—	January 21, 2015	Mount Lemmon	Mount Lemmon Survey	·	2.4 km	MPC · JPL
807441	2017 NJ_{13}	—	July 15, 2017	Haleakala	Pan-STARRS 1	·	1.6 km	MPC · JPL
807442	2017 NL_{13}	—	July 4, 2017	Haleakala	Pan-STARRS 1	EOS	1.2 km	MPC · JPL
807443	2017 NG_{14}	—	July 5, 2017	Haleakala	Pan-STARRS 1	·	1.2 km	MPC · JPL
807444	2017 NC_{16}	—	July 4, 2017	Haleakala	Pan-STARRS 1	·	2.1 km	MPC · JPL
807445	2017 NJ_{16}	—	July 4, 2017	Haleakala	Pan-STARRS 1	·	1.0 km	MPC · JPL
807446	2017 NY_{17}	—	July 2, 2017	Cerro Tololo-DECam	DECam	·	1.2 km	MPC · JPL
807447	2017 NH_{18}	—	March 27, 2016	Mount Lemmon	Mount Lemmon Survey	·	940 m	MPC · JPL
807448	2017 NV_{18}	—	July 4, 2017	Haleakala	Pan-STARRS 1	·	1.1 km	MPC · JPL
807449	2017 NS_{19}	—	April 5, 2016	Haleakala	Pan-STARRS 1	AGN	820 m	MPC · JPL
807450	2017 NS_{26}	—	July 5, 2017	Haleakala	Pan-STARRS 1	·	1.8 km	MPC · JPL
807451	2017 NH_{27}	—	July 5, 2017	Haleakala	Pan-STARRS 1	·	1.2 km	MPC · JPL
807452	2017 OJ	—	September 3, 2013	Mount Lemmon	Mount Lemmon Survey	·	920 m	MPC · JPL
807453	2017 OJ_{4}	—	October 2, 2013	Haleakala	Pan-STARRS 1	·	1.2 km	MPC · JPL
807454	2017 OR_{5}	—	July 24, 2017	Haleakala	Pan-STARRS 1	KON	1.7 km	MPC · JPL
807455	2017 OZ_{10}	—	August 14, 2013	Haleakala	Pan-STARRS 1	·	1.2 km	MPC · JPL
807456	2017 OD_{12}	—	October 26, 2009	Mount Lemmon	Mount Lemmon Survey	·	1.1 km	MPC · JPL
807457	2017 OF_{17}	—	July 25, 2017	Haleakala	Pan-STARRS 1	·	1.3 km	MPC · JPL
807458	2017 OU_{19}	—	November 28, 2013	Haleakala	Pan-STARRS 1	·	1.3 km	MPC · JPL
807459	2017 OE_{23}	—	October 5, 2013	Haleakala	Pan-STARRS 1	·	1.4 km	MPC · JPL
807460	2017 OX_{25}	—	October 25, 2013	Mount Lemmon	Mount Lemmon Survey	·	1.3 km	MPC · JPL
807461	2017 OS_{27}	—	March 10, 2016	Haleakala	Pan-STARRS 1	·	1.3 km	MPC · JPL
807462	2017 OH_{28}	—	September 6, 2013	Mount Lemmon	Mount Lemmon Survey	·	1.5 km	MPC · JPL
807463	2017 OU_{29}	—	April 3, 2016	Haleakala	Pan-STARRS 1	·	1.4 km	MPC · JPL
807464	2017 OP_{30}	—	July 26, 2017	Haleakala	Pan-STARRS 1	·	1.2 km	MPC · JPL
807465	2017 OQ_{37}	—	July 27, 2017	Haleakala	Pan-STARRS 1	·	1.3 km	MPC · JPL
807466	2017 OK_{39}	—	September 7, 2008	Mount Lemmon	Mount Lemmon Survey	·	1.2 km	MPC · JPL
807467	2017 OA_{40}	—	July 27, 2017	Haleakala	Pan-STARRS 1	·	1.9 km	MPC · JPL
807468	2017 OD_{47}	—	October 3, 2013	Haleakala	Pan-STARRS 1	EUN	920 m	MPC · JPL
807469	2017 OU_{48}	—	September 7, 2008	Mount Lemmon	Mount Lemmon Survey	·	1.3 km	MPC · JPL
807470	2017 OZ_{48}	—	March 3, 2011	Mount Lemmon	Mount Lemmon Survey	·	1.2 km	MPC · JPL
807471	2017 OE_{49}	—	July 19, 2017	XuYi	PMO NEO Survey Program	·	1.5 km	MPC · JPL
807472	2017 OY_{50}	—	July 29, 2017	Haleakala	Pan-STARRS 1	·	1.6 km	MPC · JPL
807473	2017 OF_{55}	—	November 4, 2013	Mount Lemmon	Mount Lemmon Survey	AGN	800 m	MPC · JPL
807474	2017 OC_{58}	—	November 9, 2013	Haleakala	Pan-STARRS 1	·	1.3 km	MPC · JPL
807475	2017 OM_{58}	—	December 29, 2013	Haleakala	Pan-STARRS 1	·	1.7 km	MPC · JPL
807476	2017 OT_{59}	—	November 1, 2008	Mount Lemmon	Mount Lemmon Survey	KOR	1.1 km	MPC · JPL
807477	2017 OY_{60}	—	September 10, 2004	Kitt Peak	Spacewatch	·	1.2 km	MPC · JPL
807478	2017 OD_{61}	—	August 30, 2000	La Silla	Barbieri, C.	·	980 m	MPC · JPL
807479	2017 OM_{62}	—	July 30, 2017	Haleakala	Pan-STARRS 1	·	1.4 km	MPC · JPL
807480	2017 OB_{63}	—	July 22, 2017	Haleakala	Pan-STARRS 1	·	2.5 km	MPC · JPL
807481	2017 OP_{65}	—	June 11, 2016	Mount Lemmon	Mount Lemmon Survey	·	2.1 km	MPC · JPL
807482	2017 OW_{69}	—	April 18, 2015	Cerro Tololo	DECam	·	2.1 km	MPC · JPL
807483	2017 OL_{73}	—	July 30, 2017	Haleakala	Pan-STARRS 1	·	1.6 km	MPC · JPL
807484	2017 ON_{76}	—	July 30, 2017	Haleakala	Pan-STARRS 1	·	1.1 km	MPC · JPL
807485	2017 OT_{76}	—	July 30, 2017	Haleakala	Pan-STARRS 1	·	1.5 km	MPC · JPL
807486	2017 OA_{77}	—	February 8, 2002	Kitt Peak	Spacewatch	·	980 m	MPC · JPL
807487	2017 OP_{78}	—	May 1, 2016	Cerro Tololo	DECam	KOR	990 m	MPC · JPL
807488	2017 OB_{79}	—	January 26, 2015	Haleakala	Pan-STARRS 1	·	1.2 km	MPC · JPL
807489	2017 OO_{80}	—	April 18, 2015	Cerro Tololo	DECam	·	2.3 km	MPC · JPL
807490	2017 OQ_{80}	—	July 24, 2017	Haleakala	Pan-STARRS 1	·	1.5 km	MPC · JPL
807491	2017 ON_{82}	—	July 29, 2017	Haleakala	Pan-STARRS 1	·	2.3 km	MPC · JPL
807492	2017 OR_{85}	—	July 25, 2017	Haleakala	Pan-STARRS 1	·	2.3 km	MPC · JPL
807493	2017 OG_{87}	—	July 26, 2017	Haleakala	Pan-STARRS 1	AGN	860 m	MPC · JPL
807494	2017 OS_{87}	—	July 26, 2017	Haleakala	Pan-STARRS 1	·	2.0 km	MPC · JPL
807495	2017 ON_{88}	—	July 29, 2017	Haleakala	Pan-STARRS 1	KOR	960 m	MPC · JPL
807496	2017 OS_{88}	—	July 25, 2017	Haleakala	Pan-STARRS 1	·	1.4 km	MPC · JPL
807497	2017 OA_{90}	—	May 2, 2016	Mount Lemmon	Mount Lemmon Survey	AGN	820 m	MPC · JPL
807498	2017 OC_{90}	—	April 18, 2015	Cerro Tololo	DECam	·	1.2 km	MPC · JPL
807499	2017 OF_{90}	—	July 26, 2017	Haleakala	Pan-STARRS 1	·	1.4 km	MPC · JPL
807500	2017 OP_{90}	—	July 29, 2017	Haleakala	Pan-STARRS 1	EOS	1.2 km	MPC · JPL

== 807501–807600 ==
back to top

Designation			Discovery			Properties		Ref
Permanent	Provisional	Named after	Date	Site	Discoverer(s)	Category	Diam.	Ref
807501	2017 OT_{90}	—	July 25, 2017	Haleakala	Pan-STARRS 1	·	1.7 km	MPC · JPL
807502	2017 OX_{90}	—	July 30, 2017	Haleakala	Pan-STARRS 1	·	2.4 km	MPC · JPL
807503	2017 OC_{91}	—	July 30, 2017	Haleakala	Pan-STARRS 1	·	1.4 km	MPC · JPL
807504	2017 OC_{92}	—	July 30, 2017	Haleakala	Pan-STARRS 1	(31811)	1.9 km	MPC · JPL
807505	2017 OO_{92}	—	April 1, 2016	Haleakala	Pan-STARRS 1	·	1.1 km	MPC · JPL
807506	2017 OZ_{94}	—	July 30, 2017	Haleakala	Pan-STARRS 1	·	2.3 km	MPC · JPL
807507	2017 OA_{96}	—	July 26, 2017	Haleakala	Pan-STARRS 1	·	1.8 km	MPC · JPL
807508	2017 OJ_{96}	—	May 1, 2016	Cerro Tololo	DECam	·	980 m	MPC · JPL
807509	2017 OK_{96}	—	July 22, 2017	ESA OGS	ESA OGS	·	1.7 km	MPC · JPL
807510	2017 OP_{99}	—	July 26, 2017	Haleakala	Pan-STARRS 1	MRX	660 m	MPC · JPL
807511	2017 OW_{99}	—	July 27, 2017	Haleakala	Pan-STARRS 1	·	1.3 km	MPC · JPL
807512	2017 OC_{101}	—	July 29, 2017	Haleakala	Pan-STARRS 1	EOS	1.3 km	MPC · JPL
807513	2017 OG_{101}	—	July 26, 2017	Haleakala	Pan-STARRS 1	·	1.2 km	MPC · JPL
807514	2017 OA_{102}	—	July 30, 2017	Haleakala	Pan-STARRS 1	·	1.7 km	MPC · JPL
807515	2017 OV_{104}	—	November 11, 2007	Anderson Mesa	Wasserman, L. H.	·	590 m	MPC · JPL
807516	2017 ON_{106}	—	July 25, 2017	Haleakala	Pan-STARRS 1	·	1.1 km	MPC · JPL
807517	2017 OT_{106}	—	January 22, 2015	Haleakala	Pan-STARRS 1	·	2.1 km	MPC · JPL
807518	2017 OJ_{107}	—	July 26, 2017	Haleakala	Pan-STARRS 1	·	1.3 km	MPC · JPL
807519	2017 OY_{107}	—	July 25, 2017	Haleakala	Pan-STARRS 1	HOF	1.7 km	MPC · JPL
807520	2017 OA_{113}	—	November 6, 2008	Kitt Peak	Spacewatch	·	1.4 km	MPC · JPL
807521	2017 OR_{113}	—	October 22, 2003	Kitt Peak	Spacewatch	·	1.4 km	MPC · JPL
807522	2017 OU_{113}	—	July 29, 2017	Haleakala	Pan-STARRS 1	NAE	1.5 km	MPC · JPL
807523	2017 OX_{113}	—	July 26, 2017	Haleakala	Pan-STARRS 1	·	1.3 km	MPC · JPL
807524	2017 OJ_{114}	—	July 30, 2017	Haleakala	Pan-STARRS 1	·	1.3 km	MPC · JPL
807525	2017 OB_{115}	—	July 25, 2017	Haleakala	Pan-STARRS 1	·	1.7 km	MPC · JPL
807526	2017 OK_{115}	—	November 10, 2013	Mount Lemmon	Mount Lemmon Survey	·	1.3 km	MPC · JPL
807527	2017 OW_{116}	—	April 30, 2016	Haleakala	Pan-STARRS 1	HOF	1.7 km	MPC · JPL
807528	2017 OS_{117}	—	July 25, 2017	Haleakala	Pan-STARRS 1	VER	2.2 km	MPC · JPL
807529	2017 OU_{117}	—	July 25, 2017	Haleakala	Pan-STARRS 1	·	1.2 km	MPC · JPL
807530	2017 OA_{118}	—	July 27, 2017	Haleakala	Pan-STARRS 1	·	1.5 km	MPC · JPL
807531	2017 OM_{118}	—	July 29, 2017	Haleakala	Pan-STARRS 1	KOR	890 m	MPC · JPL
807532	2017 ON_{119}	—	July 30, 2017	Haleakala	Pan-STARRS 1	·	1.7 km	MPC · JPL
807533	2017 OF_{120}	—	July 27, 2017	Haleakala	Pan-STARRS 1	·	970 m	MPC · JPL
807534	2017 ON_{120}	—	July 26, 2017	Haleakala	Pan-STARRS 1	·	1.2 km	MPC · JPL
807535	2017 OQ_{120}	—	July 30, 2017	Haleakala	Pan-STARRS 1	·	1.1 km	MPC · JPL
807536	2017 OW_{120}	—	July 30, 2017	Haleakala	Pan-STARRS 1	·	1.4 km	MPC · JPL
807537	2017 OH_{121}	—	February 16, 2015	Haleakala	Pan-STARRS 1	VER	2.0 km	MPC · JPL
807538	2017 OP_{121}	—	July 26, 2017	Haleakala	Pan-STARRS 1	·	1.5 km	MPC · JPL
807539	2017 OQ_{121}	—	July 30, 2017	Haleakala	Pan-STARRS 1	DOR	1.9 km	MPC · JPL
807540	2017 OB_{122}	—	July 27, 2017	Haleakala	Pan-STARRS 1	·	1.2 km	MPC · JPL
807541	2017 OD_{122}	—	July 27, 2017	Haleakala	Pan-STARRS 1	·	1.2 km	MPC · JPL
807542	2017 OO_{122}	—	November 8, 2009	Mount Lemmon	Mount Lemmon Survey	·	920 m	MPC · JPL
807543	2017 OQ_{122}	—	December 21, 2014	Haleakala	Pan-STARRS 1	·	1.2 km	MPC · JPL
807544	2017 OS_{122}	—	July 29, 2017	Haleakala	Pan-STARRS 1	·	720 m	MPC · JPL
807545	2017 OA_{123}	—	July 25, 2017	Haleakala	Pan-STARRS 1	·	1.1 km	MPC · JPL
807546	2017 OS_{124}	—	January 18, 2015	Haleakala	Pan-STARRS 1	·	770 m	MPC · JPL
807547	2017 OY_{129}	—	July 25, 2017	Haleakala	Pan-STARRS 1	·	1.3 km	MPC · JPL
807548	2017 OV_{132}	—	July 25, 2017	Haleakala	Pan-STARRS 1	·	1.4 km	MPC · JPL
807549	2017 OE_{138}	—	February 10, 2015	Mount Lemmon	Mount Lemmon Survey	EOS	1.2 km	MPC · JPL
807550	2017 OY_{139}	—	August 16, 2009	Kitt Peak	Spacewatch	·	680 m	MPC · JPL
807551	2017 ON_{140}	—	July 26, 2017	Haleakala	Pan-STARRS 1	·	1.7 km	MPC · JPL
807552	2017 OP_{141}	—	July 5, 2017	Haleakala	Pan-STARRS 1	AGN	750 m	MPC · JPL
807553	2017 OQ_{141}	—	July 25, 2017	Haleakala	Pan-STARRS 1	·	1.3 km	MPC · JPL
807554	2017 OR_{141}	—	July 30, 2017	Haleakala	Pan-STARRS 1	·	1.0 km	MPC · JPL
807555	2017 OA_{142}	—	July 25, 2017	Haleakala	Pan-STARRS 1	·	1.2 km	MPC · JPL
807556	2017 OB_{143}	—	July 30, 2017	Haleakala	Pan-STARRS 1	·	1.5 km	MPC · JPL
807557	2017 OH_{144}	—	July 26, 2017	Haleakala	Pan-STARRS 1	·	1.4 km	MPC · JPL
807558	2017 OF_{146}	—	July 26, 2017	Haleakala	Pan-STARRS 1	·	1.3 km	MPC · JPL
807559	2017 OF_{147}	—	July 26, 2017	Haleakala	Pan-STARRS 1	·	2.4 km	MPC · JPL
807560	2017 OL_{148}	—	December 29, 2014	Mount Lemmon	Mount Lemmon Survey	HOF	1.7 km	MPC · JPL
807561	2017 OJ_{149}	—	July 26, 2017	Haleakala	Pan-STARRS 1	·	1.4 km	MPC · JPL
807562	2017 OC_{150}	—	July 26, 2017	Haleakala	Pan-STARRS 1	·	1.2 km	MPC · JPL
807563	2017 OG_{150}	—	July 25, 2017	Haleakala	Pan-STARRS 1	·	1.4 km	MPC · JPL
807564	2017 OB_{151}	—	April 2, 2016	Mount Lemmon	Mount Lemmon Survey	·	1.2 km	MPC · JPL
807565	2017 OD_{151}	—	July 26, 2017	Haleakala	Pan-STARRS 1	·	1.3 km	MPC · JPL
807566	2017 OB_{152}	—	July 25, 2017	Haleakala	Pan-STARRS 1	KOR	920 m	MPC · JPL
807567	2017 OJ_{152}	—	July 25, 2017	Haleakala	Pan-STARRS 1	·	1.1 km	MPC · JPL
807568	2017 OK_{152}	—	July 24, 2017	Haleakala	Pan-STARRS 1	·	1.3 km	MPC · JPL
807569	2017 OW_{152}	—	October 23, 2009	Mount Lemmon	Mount Lemmon Survey	·	1.2 km	MPC · JPL
807570	2017 OJ_{153}	—	July 25, 2017	Haleakala	Pan-STARRS 1	·	1.3 km	MPC · JPL
807571	2017 OS_{156}	—	October 15, 2009	Mount Lemmon	Mount Lemmon Survey	·	990 m	MPC · JPL
807572	2017 OU_{166}	—	July 29, 2017	Haleakala	Pan-STARRS 1	BRA	1.1 km	MPC · JPL
807573	2017 OM_{169}	—	July 25, 2017	Haleakala	Pan-STARRS 1	·	2.1 km	MPC · JPL
807574	2017 OO_{169}	—	January 21, 2015	Haleakala	Pan-STARRS 1	·	1.4 km	MPC · JPL
807575	2017 OY_{179}	—	July 25, 2017	Haleakala	Pan-STARRS 1	·	2.2 km	MPC · JPL
807576	2017 OZ_{180}	—	July 25, 2017	Haleakala	Pan-STARRS 1	·	1.9 km	MPC · JPL
807577	2017 OP_{181}	—	July 25, 2017	Haleakala	Pan-STARRS 1	·	1.8 km	MPC · JPL
807578	2017 OF_{182}	—	July 25, 2017	Haleakala	Pan-STARRS 1	·	1.9 km	MPC · JPL
807579 Yasuhiroyasuko	2017 OV_{199}	Yasuhiroyasuko	September 27, 2017	Mauna Kea	COIAS	·	1.1 km	MPC · JPL
807580	2017 PU_{1}	—	January 20, 2015	Haleakala	Pan-STARRS 1	·	1.3 km	MPC · JPL
807581	2017 PK_{4}	—	August 1, 2017	Haleakala	Pan-STARRS 1	·	1.2 km	MPC · JPL
807582	2017 PQ_{5}	—	August 1, 2017	Haleakala	Pan-STARRS 1	·	1.1 km	MPC · JPL
807583	2017 PY_{7}	—	October 26, 2013	Mount Lemmon	Mount Lemmon Survey	·	1.2 km	MPC · JPL
807584	2017 PL_{10}	—	October 28, 2008	Kitt Peak	Spacewatch	KOR	890 m	MPC · JPL
807585	2017 PB_{11}	—	January 20, 2009	Mount Lemmon	Mount Lemmon Survey	·	2.3 km	MPC · JPL
807586	2017 PK_{11}	—	August 1, 2017	Haleakala	Pan-STARRS 1	AGN	850 m	MPC · JPL
807587	2017 PO_{11}	—	August 1, 2017	Haleakala	Pan-STARRS 1	KOR	1.0 km	MPC · JPL
807588	2017 PM_{16}	—	August 1, 2017	Haleakala	Pan-STARRS 1	·	1.2 km	MPC · JPL
807589	2017 PV_{17}	—	August 1, 2017	Haleakala	Pan-STARRS 1	·	1.3 km	MPC · JPL
807590	2017 PE_{22}	—	August 1, 2017	Haleakala	Pan-STARRS 1	EOS	1.1 km	MPC · JPL
807591	2017 PK_{28}	—	February 5, 2011	Kitt Peak	Spacewatch	·	1.2 km	MPC · JPL
807592	2017 PC_{30}	—	April 30, 2016	Haleakala	Pan-STARRS 1	·	1.3 km	MPC · JPL
807593	2017 PJ_{36}	—	September 4, 2008	Kitt Peak	Spacewatch	AGN	730 m	MPC · JPL
807594	2017 PP_{39}	—	August 7, 2008	Kitt Peak	Spacewatch	AEO	760 m	MPC · JPL
807595	2017 PV_{39}	—	January 14, 2016	Haleakala	Pan-STARRS 1	·	1.1 km	MPC · JPL
807596	2017 PO_{40}	—	August 15, 2017	Haleakala	Pan-STARRS 1	·	1.4 km	MPC · JPL
807597	2017 PO_{41}	—	July 30, 1995	Kitt Peak	Spacewatch	·	1.4 km	MPC · JPL
807598	2017 PW_{41}	—	August 1, 2017	Haleakala	Pan-STARRS 1	·	2.3 km	MPC · JPL
807599	2017 PX_{41}	—	August 1, 2017	Haleakala	Pan-STARRS 1	·	2.6 km	MPC · JPL
807600	2017 PD_{42}	—	August 1, 2017	Haleakala	Pan-STARRS 1	EUP	1.7 km	MPC · JPL

== 807601–807700 ==
back to top

Designation			Discovery			Properties		Ref
Permanent	Provisional	Named after	Date	Site	Discoverer(s)	Category	Diam.	Ref
807601	2017 PA_{43}	—	August 1, 2017	Haleakala	Pan-STARRS 1	·	1.9 km	MPC · JPL
807602	2017 PQ_{46}	—	May 20, 2015	Cerro Tololo	DECam	EUP	2.2 km	MPC · JPL
807603	2017 PR_{46}	—	August 1, 2017	Haleakala	Pan-STARRS 1	·	2.2 km	MPC · JPL
807604	2017 PA_{50}	—	April 1, 2016	Haleakala	Pan-STARRS 1	·	1.0 km	MPC · JPL
807605	2017 PN_{51}	—	August 3, 2017	Haleakala	Pan-STARRS 1	·	1.0 km	MPC · JPL
807606	2017 PM_{52}	—	August 1, 2017	Haleakala	Pan-STARRS 1	·	2.0 km	MPC · JPL
807607	2017 PB_{53}	—	August 1, 2017	Haleakala	Pan-STARRS 1	EOS	1.3 km	MPC · JPL
807608	2017 PH_{55}	—	August 1, 2017	Haleakala	Pan-STARRS 1	·	1.3 km	MPC · JPL
807609	2017 PK_{59}	—	August 1, 2017	Haleakala	Pan-STARRS 1	VER	1.7 km	MPC · JPL
807610	2017 PM_{59}	—	August 6, 2017	Haleakala	Pan-STARRS 1	·	1.4 km	MPC · JPL
807611	2017 PJ_{61}	—	March 10, 2016	Haleakala	Pan-STARRS 1	EUN	770 m	MPC · JPL
807612	2017 PQ_{61}	—	August 1, 2017	Haleakala	Pan-STARRS 1	·	1.1 km	MPC · JPL
807613	2017 PX_{61}	—	December 31, 2013	Mount Lemmon	Mount Lemmon Survey	·	2.1 km	MPC · JPL
807614	2017 PY_{61}	—	August 1, 2017	Haleakala	Pan-STARRS 1	·	1.2 km	MPC · JPL
807615	2017 PG_{64}	—	August 1, 2017	Haleakala	Pan-STARRS 1	·	1.2 km	MPC · JPL
807616	2017 PP_{64}	—	August 15, 2017	Haleakala	Pan-STARRS 1	·	750 m	MPC · JPL
807617	2017 PD_{72}	—	August 1, 2017	Haleakala	Pan-STARRS 1	VER	1.8 km	MPC · JPL
807618	2017 PK_{75}	—	August 1, 2017	Haleakala	Pan-STARRS 1	·	1.4 km	MPC · JPL
807619	2017 PF_{79}	—	August 3, 2017	Haleakala	Pan-STARRS 1	·	1.3 km	MPC · JPL
807620	2017 PB_{86}	—	August 3, 2017	Haleakala	Pan-STARRS 1	·	1.6 km	MPC · JPL
807621	2017 QM_{3}	—	October 24, 2014	Kitt Peak	Spacewatch	·	530 m	MPC · JPL
807622	2017 QJ_{7}	—	May 1, 2016	Cerro Tololo	DECam	·	1.5 km	MPC · JPL
807623	2017 QT_{7}	—	October 7, 2008	Kitt Peak	Spacewatch	·	1.3 km	MPC · JPL
807624	2017 QM_{12}	—	February 16, 2015	Haleakala	Pan-STARRS 1	EOS	1.2 km	MPC · JPL
807625	2017 QG_{15}	—	July 26, 2017	Haleakala	Pan-STARRS 1	·	1.5 km	MPC · JPL
807626	2017 QQ_{18}	—	October 8, 2007	Mount Lemmon	Mount Lemmon Survey	·	1.4 km	MPC · JPL
807627	2017 QV_{18}	—	August 9, 2013	Haleakala	Pan-STARRS 1	·	990 m	MPC · JPL
807628	2017 QH_{22}	—	September 10, 2004	Kitt Peak	Spacewatch	·	970 m	MPC · JPL
807629	2017 QB_{23}	—	July 27, 2017	Haleakala	Pan-STARRS 1	JUN	670 m	MPC · JPL
807630	2017 QK_{25}	—	September 15, 2003	Palomar Mountain	NEAT	·	1.5 km	MPC · JPL
807631	2017 QR_{29}	—	November 9, 2008	Kitt Peak	Spacewatch	·	1.4 km	MPC · JPL
807632	2017 QE_{30}	—	September 18, 2012	Mount Lemmon	Mount Lemmon Survey	·	1.5 km	MPC · JPL
807633	2017 QL_{30}	—	December 10, 2013	Mount Lemmon	Mount Lemmon Survey	·	1.6 km	MPC · JPL
807634	2017 QT_{31}	—	October 20, 2012	Kitt Peak	Spacewatch	·	2.3 km	MPC · JPL
807635	2017 QS_{36}	—	June 25, 2017	Haleakala	Pan-STARRS 1	·	1.1 km	MPC · JPL
807636	2017 QQ_{38}	—	July 14, 2013	Haleakala	Pan-STARRS 1	·	740 m	MPC · JPL
807637	2017 QN_{40}	—	December 21, 2014	Haleakala	Pan-STARRS 1	·	1.1 km	MPC · JPL
807638	2017 QL_{45}	—	September 22, 2008	Mount Lemmon	Mount Lemmon Survey	HOF	1.8 km	MPC · JPL
807639	2017 QV_{48}	—	October 11, 2012	Mount Lemmon	Mount Lemmon Survey	·	2.1 km	MPC · JPL
807640	2017 QP_{51}	—	November 9, 2013	Mount Lemmon	Mount Lemmon Survey	·	1.4 km	MPC · JPL
807641	2017 QU_{52}	—	February 20, 2014	Mount Lemmon	Mount Lemmon Survey	·	2.2 km	MPC · JPL
807642	2017 QV_{55}	—	August 18, 2017	Haleakala	Pan-STARRS 1	·	1.7 km	MPC · JPL
807643	2017 QQ_{56}	—	August 10, 2004	Socorro	LINEAR	·	1.3 km	MPC · JPL
807644	2017 QK_{57}	—	October 5, 2013	Haleakala	Pan-STARRS 1	·	1.2 km	MPC · JPL
807645	2017 QC_{59}	—	April 18, 2015	Cerro Tololo	DECam	·	2.2 km	MPC · JPL
807646	2017 QX_{60}	—	May 3, 2008	Mount Lemmon	Mount Lemmon Survey	·	1.1 km	MPC · JPL
807647	2017 QY_{64}	—	September 28, 2008	Catalina	CSS	CLO	1.4 km	MPC · JPL
807648	2017 QU_{66}	—	October 1, 2013	Kitt Peak	Spacewatch	·	1.2 km	MPC · JPL
807649	2017 QH_{68}	—	August 31, 2017	Haleakala	Pan-STARRS 1	·	2.0 km	MPC · JPL
807650	2017 QV_{71}	—	August 24, 2017	Haleakala	Pan-STARRS 1	KOR	980 m	MPC · JPL
807651	2017 QX_{72}	—	August 23, 2017	Haleakala	Pan-STARRS 1	·	1.4 km	MPC · JPL
807652	2017 QK_{77}	—	October 9, 2008	Kitt Peak	Spacewatch	·	1.3 km	MPC · JPL
807653	2017 QQ_{78}	—	August 31, 2017	Haleakala	Pan-STARRS 1	·	1.8 km	MPC · JPL
807654	2017 QA_{79}	—	August 31, 2017	Haleakala	Pan-STARRS 1	AGN	900 m	MPC · JPL
807655	2017 QM_{83}	—	August 8, 2004	Palomar Mountain	NEAT	·	950 m	MPC · JPL
807656	2017 QS_{83}	—	August 23, 2017	XuYi	PMO NEO Survey Program	·	1.3 km	MPC · JPL
807657	2017 QO_{87}	—	August 24, 2017	Haleakala	Pan-STARRS 1	·	2.8 km	MPC · JPL
807658	2017 QX_{87}	—	August 24, 2017	Haleakala	Pan-STARRS 1	·	2.1 km	MPC · JPL
807659	2017 QK_{88}	—	August 18, 2017	Haleakala	Pan-STARRS 1	·	1.6 km	MPC · JPL
807660	2017 QB_{90}	—	August 31, 2017	Haleakala	Pan-STARRS 1	KOR	1.0 km	MPC · JPL
807661	2017 QH_{90}	—	August 24, 2017	Haleakala	Pan-STARRS 1	·	1.4 km	MPC · JPL
807662	2017 QS_{90}	—	August 30, 2017	Mount Lemmon	Mount Lemmon Survey	·	1.8 km	MPC · JPL
807663	2017 QL_{93}	—	August 31, 2017	Haleakala	Pan-STARRS 1	·	1.7 km	MPC · JPL
807664	2017 QN_{93}	—	August 24, 2017	Haleakala	Pan-STARRS 1	·	1.4 km	MPC · JPL
807665	2017 QM_{96}	—	September 30, 2006	Mount Lemmon	Mount Lemmon Survey	·	1.9 km	MPC · JPL
807666	2017 QU_{97}	—	August 16, 2017	Haleakala	Pan-STARRS 1	·	1.6 km	MPC · JPL
807667	2017 QJ_{98}	—	August 24, 2017	Haleakala	Pan-STARRS 1	·	2.3 km	MPC · JPL
807668	2017 QN_{98}	—	August 16, 2017	Haleakala	Pan-STARRS 1	·	1.1 km	MPC · JPL
807669	2017 QX_{99}	—	August 31, 2017	Haleakala	Pan-STARRS 1	·	1.7 km	MPC · JPL
807670	2017 QN_{100}	—	August 24, 2017	Haleakala	Pan-STARRS 1	·	1.9 km	MPC · JPL
807671	2017 QW_{102}	—	August 24, 2017	Haleakala	Pan-STARRS 1	NAE	1.7 km	MPC · JPL
807672	2017 QQ_{104}	—	August 24, 2017	Haleakala	Pan-STARRS 1	·	1.6 km	MPC · JPL
807673	2017 QY_{104}	—	August 31, 2017	Haleakala	Pan-STARRS 1	·	1.7 km	MPC · JPL
807674	2017 QA_{107}	—	August 17, 2017	Haleakala	Pan-STARRS 1	EOS	1.2 km	MPC · JPL
807675	2017 QQ_{108}	—	August 16, 2017	Haleakala	Pan-STARRS 1	EOS	1.3 km	MPC · JPL
807676	2017 QB_{109}	—	August 16, 2017	Haleakala	Pan-STARRS 1	·	1.0 km	MPC · JPL
807677	2017 QK_{109}	—	August 16, 2017	Haleakala	Pan-STARRS 1	EOS	1.2 km	MPC · JPL
807678	2017 QJ_{111}	—	August 31, 2017	Haleakala	Pan-STARRS 1	·	1.7 km	MPC · JPL
807679	2017 QH_{113}	—	July 30, 2017	Haleakala	Pan-STARRS 1	·	960 m	MPC · JPL
807680	2017 QP_{113}	—	August 24, 2017	Haleakala	Pan-STARRS 1	KOR	920 m	MPC · JPL
807681	2017 QQ_{113}	—	August 24, 2017	Haleakala	Pan-STARRS 1	KOR	990 m	MPC · JPL
807682	2017 QQ_{115}	—	August 24, 2017	Haleakala	Pan-STARRS 1	·	2.1 km	MPC · JPL
807683	2017 QS_{115}	—	September 7, 2008	Mount Lemmon	Mount Lemmon Survey	·	1.3 km	MPC · JPL
807684	2017 QK_{116}	—	August 17, 2017	Haleakala	Pan-STARRS 1	AGN	730 m	MPC · JPL
807685	2017 QM_{116}	—	August 17, 2017	Haleakala	Pan-STARRS 1	GEF	730 m	MPC · JPL
807686	2017 QX_{116}	—	August 31, 2017	Haleakala	Pan-STARRS 1	EOS	1.1 km	MPC · JPL
807687	2017 QL_{117}	—	August 16, 2017	Haleakala	Pan-STARRS 1	·	1.2 km	MPC · JPL
807688	2017 QY_{117}	—	January 20, 2015	Haleakala	Pan-STARRS 1	·	1.4 km	MPC · JPL
807689	2017 QZ_{118}	—	August 28, 2017	Cerro Paranal	Gaia Ground Based Optical Tracking	·	1.4 km	MPC · JPL
807690	2017 QK_{119}	—	August 16, 2017	Haleakala	Pan-STARRS 1	·	1.7 km	MPC · JPL
807691	2017 QO_{119}	—	November 4, 2013	Haleakala	Pan-STARRS 1	·	1.4 km	MPC · JPL
807692	2017 QL_{120}	—	October 4, 2013	Calar Alto	S. Hellmich, G. Hahn	·	1.5 km	MPC · JPL
807693	2017 QE_{121}	—	August 24, 2017	Haleakala	Pan-STARRS 1	·	1.5 km	MPC · JPL
807694	2017 QG_{121}	—	April 21, 2015	Cerro Tololo	DECam	·	1.4 km	MPC · JPL
807695	2017 QQ_{121}	—	August 31, 2017	Haleakala	Pan-STARRS 1	·	2.5 km	MPC · JPL
807696	2017 QX_{121}	—	August 28, 2017	Mount Lemmon	Mount Lemmon Survey	·	1.6 km	MPC · JPL
807697	2017 QS_{122}	—	August 31, 2017	Haleakala	Pan-STARRS 1	·	1.2 km	MPC · JPL
807698	2017 QD_{123}	—	August 28, 2017	Mount Lemmon	Mount Lemmon Survey	THM	1.5 km	MPC · JPL
807699	2017 QT_{124}	—	August 16, 2017	Haleakala	Pan-STARRS 1	·	1.6 km	MPC · JPL
807700	2017 QW_{126}	—	August 24, 2017	Haleakala	Pan-STARRS 1	·	2.0 km	MPC · JPL

== 807701–807800 ==
back to top

Designation			Discovery			Properties		Ref
Permanent	Provisional	Named after	Date	Site	Discoverer(s)	Category	Diam.	Ref
807701	2017 QP_{141}	—	August 24, 2017	Haleakala	Pan-STARRS 1	·	1.2 km	MPC · JPL
807702	2017 QU_{141}	—	May 1, 2016	Cerro Tololo	DECam	·	760 m	MPC · JPL
807703	2017 QV_{141}	—	August 29, 2017	Mount Lemmon	Mount Lemmon Survey	LUT	3.6 km	MPC · JPL
807704	2017 QW_{145}	—	August 31, 2017	Haleakala	Pan-STARRS 1	·	1.5 km	MPC · JPL
807705	2017 QO_{147}	—	August 18, 2017	Haleakala	Pan-STARRS 1	EOS	1.2 km	MPC · JPL
807706	2017 QE_{149}	—	August 16, 2017	Haleakala	Pan-STARRS 1	EOS	1.3 km	MPC · JPL
807707	2017 QP_{149}	—	August 23, 2017	Haleakala	Pan-STARRS 1	·	1.3 km	MPC · JPL
807708	2017 QU_{149}	—	August 24, 2017	Haleakala	Pan-STARRS 1	·	1.5 km	MPC · JPL
807709	2017 QB_{152}	—	August 31, 2017	Haleakala	Pan-STARRS 1	·	1.3 km	MPC · JPL
807710	2017 QJ_{152}	—	August 17, 2017	Haleakala	Pan-STARRS 1	·	1.5 km	MPC · JPL
807711	2017 QP_{153}	—	August 28, 2017	Mount Lemmon	Mount Lemmon Survey	·	1.8 km	MPC · JPL
807712	2017 QC_{154}	—	January 23, 2015	Haleakala	Pan-STARRS 1	·	1.6 km	MPC · JPL
807713	2017 QQ_{154}	—	August 16, 2017	Haleakala	Pan-STARRS 1	·	1.4 km	MPC · JPL
807714	2017 QX_{154}	—	January 22, 2015	Haleakala	Pan-STARRS 1	·	1.4 km	MPC · JPL
807715	2017 QQ_{155}	—	August 31, 2017	Haleakala	Pan-STARRS 1	·	1.6 km	MPC · JPL
807716	2017 QT_{155}	—	February 16, 2015	Haleakala	Pan-STARRS 1	·	1.4 km	MPC · JPL
807717	2017 QF_{158}	—	August 17, 2017	Haleakala	Pan-STARRS 1	·	1.5 km	MPC · JPL
807718	2017 QP_{158}	—	August 17, 2017	Haleakala	Pan-STARRS 1	·	1.3 km	MPC · JPL
807719	2017 QV_{158}	—	August 23, 2017	Haleakala	Pan-STARRS 1	·	1.1 km	MPC · JPL
807720	2017 QG_{159}	—	November 1, 2013	Mount Lemmon	Mount Lemmon Survey	·	1.4 km	MPC · JPL
807721	2017 QJ_{159}	—	August 28, 2017	Mount Lemmon	Mount Lemmon Survey	·	1.4 km	MPC · JPL
807722	2017 QH_{160}	—	January 23, 2015	Haleakala	Pan-STARRS 1	·	1.5 km	MPC · JPL
807723	2017 QS_{160}	—	August 16, 2017	Haleakala	Pan-STARRS 1	·	1.5 km	MPC · JPL
807724	2017 QO_{161}	—	October 8, 2008	Mount Lemmon	Mount Lemmon Survey	·	1.6 km	MPC · JPL
807725	2017 QW_{161}	—	August 31, 2017	Haleakala	Pan-STARRS 1	·	1.6 km	MPC · JPL
807726	2017 QH_{162}	—	August 16, 2017	Haleakala	Pan-STARRS 1	WIT	630 m	MPC · JPL
807727	2017 QG_{164}	—	August 16, 2017	Haleakala	Pan-STARRS 1	·	1.2 km	MPC · JPL
807728	2017 QR_{164}	—	August 24, 2017	Haleakala	Pan-STARRS 1	EOS	1.2 km	MPC · JPL
807729	2017 QO_{165}	—	August 24, 2017	Haleakala	Pan-STARRS 1	·	1.8 km	MPC · JPL
807730	2017 QP_{171}	—	August 23, 2017	Haleakala	Pan-STARRS 1	·	1.6 km	MPC · JPL
807731	2017 QY_{179}	—	August 16, 2017	Haleakala	Pan-STARRS 1	EOS	1.2 km	MPC · JPL
807732	2017 QO_{181}	—	August 16, 2017	Haleakala	Pan-STARRS 1	·	2.2 km	MPC · JPL
807733	2017 QK_{182}	—	August 17, 2017	Haleakala	Pan-STARRS 1	·	1.5 km	MPC · JPL
807734	2017 QT_{184}	—	August 23, 2017	Haleakala	Pan-STARRS 1	·	2.1 km	MPC · JPL
807735	2017 QQ_{185}	—	August 23, 2017	Haleakala	Pan-STARRS 1	·	1.8 km	MPC · JPL
807736	2017 QV_{186}	—	August 23, 2017	Haleakala	Pan-STARRS 1	EOS	1.2 km	MPC · JPL
807737	2017 QO_{187}	—	August 18, 2017	Haleakala	Pan-STARRS 1	EOS	1.2 km	MPC · JPL
807738	2017 QJ_{188}	—	August 31, 2017	Haleakala	Pan-STARRS 1	HYG	1.7 km	MPC · JPL
807739	2017 QR_{217}	—	January 20, 2015	Haleakala	Pan-STARRS 1	·	1.4 km	MPC · JPL
807740	2017 QZ_{217}	—	August 31, 2017	Haleakala	Pan-STARRS 1	·	1.3 km	MPC · JPL
807741	2017 QA_{218}	—	August 31, 2017	Haleakala	Pan-STARRS 1	·	1.8 km	MPC · JPL
807742	2017 RM	—	May 14, 2004	Kitt Peak	Spacewatch	·	1.3 km	MPC · JPL
807743	2017 RR_{8}	—	January 18, 2015	Haleakala	Pan-STARRS 1	·	400 m	MPC · JPL
807744	2017 RQ_{11}	—	January 17, 2015	Haleakala	Pan-STARRS 1	·	1.3 km	MPC · JPL
807745	2017 RB_{17}	—	October 11, 2012	Haleakala	Pan-STARRS 1	·	1.6 km	MPC · JPL
807746	2017 RC_{19}	—	July 29, 2017	Haleakala	Pan-STARRS 1	·	1.8 km	MPC · JPL
807747	2017 RK_{19}	—	April 11, 2016	Haleakala	Pan-STARRS 1	EUN	1.1 km	MPC · JPL
807748	2017 RP_{23}	—	April 1, 2016	Haleakala	Pan-STARRS 1	GEF	750 m	MPC · JPL
807749	2017 RD_{27}	—	August 23, 2017	Haleakala	Pan-STARRS 1	·	2.2 km	MPC · JPL
807750	2017 RW_{29}	—	January 22, 2015	Haleakala	Pan-STARRS 1	·	1.6 km	MPC · JPL
807751	2017 RW_{31}	—	September 14, 2017	Haleakala	Pan-STARRS 1	KOR	940 m	MPC · JPL
807752	2017 RO_{32}	—	September 14, 2017	Haleakala	Pan-STARRS 1	·	1.4 km	MPC · JPL
807753	2017 RS_{33}	—	July 29, 2017	Haleakala	Pan-STARRS 1	·	1.2 km	MPC · JPL
807754	2017 RJ_{35}	—	August 1, 2017	Haleakala	Pan-STARRS 1	·	1.2 km	MPC · JPL
807755	2017 RE_{36}	—	February 19, 2015	Haleakala	Pan-STARRS 1	·	1.3 km	MPC · JPL
807756	2017 RG_{36}	—	November 1, 2013	Kitt Peak	Spacewatch	·	1.2 km	MPC · JPL
807757	2017 RD_{37}	—	November 19, 2008	Mount Lemmon	Mount Lemmon Survey	·	1.3 km	MPC · JPL
807758	2017 RE_{37}	—	September 14, 2017	Haleakala	Pan-STARRS 1	KOR	990 m	MPC · JPL
807759	2017 RT_{38}	—	February 24, 2015	Haleakala	Pan-STARRS 1	·	1.2 km	MPC · JPL
807760	2017 RF_{40}	—	August 17, 2012	Haleakala	Pan-STARRS 1	·	1.4 km	MPC · JPL
807761	2017 RR_{40}	—	August 16, 2017	Haleakala	Pan-STARRS 1	·	1.4 km	MPC · JPL
807762	2017 RS_{41}	—	August 16, 2017	Haleakala	Pan-STARRS 1	EOS	1.1 km	MPC · JPL
807763	2017 RV_{42}	—	May 1, 2016	Cerro Tololo	DECam	·	1.2 km	MPC · JPL
807764	2017 RJ_{43}	—	October 31, 2013	Kitt Peak	Spacewatch	·	840 m	MPC · JPL
807765	2017 RX_{43}	—	September 14, 2017	Haleakala	Pan-STARRS 1	KOR	890 m	MPC · JPL
807766	2017 RA_{46}	—	January 31, 2006	Mount Lemmon	Mount Lemmon Survey	·	990 m	MPC · JPL
807767	2017 RP_{47}	—	September 14, 2017	Haleakala	Pan-STARRS 1	EOS	1.2 km	MPC · JPL
807768	2017 RA_{53}	—	February 10, 2014	Haleakala	Pan-STARRS 1	·	1.9 km	MPC · JPL
807769	2017 RQ_{53}	—	September 14, 2017	Haleakala	Pan-STARRS 1	HOF	1.7 km	MPC · JPL
807770	2017 RR_{54}	—	September 21, 2008	Kitt Peak	Spacewatch	HOF	1.8 km	MPC · JPL
807771	2017 RU_{54}	—	April 18, 2015	Cerro Tololo	DECam	EOS	1.1 km	MPC · JPL
807772	2017 RJ_{59}	—	September 14, 2017	Haleakala	Pan-STARRS 1	VER	1.9 km	MPC · JPL
807773	2017 RO_{59}	—	May 21, 2012	Haleakala	Pan-STARRS 1	·	990 m	MPC · JPL
807774	2017 RC_{62}	—	April 13, 2015	Haleakala	Pan-STARRS 1	·	2.0 km	MPC · JPL
807775	2017 RX_{63}	—	September 14, 2017	Haleakala	Pan-STARRS 1	EOS	1.1 km	MPC · JPL
807776	2017 RB_{65}	—	October 17, 2012	Haleakala	Pan-STARRS 1	·	1.4 km	MPC · JPL
807777	2017 RH_{66}	—	January 22, 2015	Haleakala	Pan-STARRS 1	HOF	1.7 km	MPC · JPL
807778	2017 RC_{67}	—	September 15, 2007	Kitt Peak	Spacewatch	·	1.4 km	MPC · JPL
807779	2017 RN_{71}	—	September 14, 2017	Haleakala	Pan-STARRS 1	(12739)	1.1 km	MPC · JPL
807780	2017 RE_{72}	—	March 15, 2010	Mount Lemmon	Mount Lemmon Survey	·	1.5 km	MPC · JPL
807781	2017 RA_{74}	—	August 1, 2017	Haleakala	Pan-STARRS 1	·	1.4 km	MPC · JPL
807782	2017 RK_{82}	—	September 13, 2007	Mount Lemmon	Mount Lemmon Survey	KOR	1.1 km	MPC · JPL
807783	2017 RL_{87}	—	August 24, 2017	Haleakala	Pan-STARRS 1	·	1.4 km	MPC · JPL
807784	2017 RR_{91}	—	October 6, 2008	Kitt Peak	Spacewatch	·	1.5 km	MPC · JPL
807785	2017 RG_{92}	—	November 4, 2013	Mount Lemmon	Mount Lemmon Survey	·	980 m	MPC · JPL
807786	2017 RC_{94}	—	February 27, 2015	Haleakala	Pan-STARRS 1	·	1.4 km	MPC · JPL
807787	2017 RM_{94}	—	September 15, 2017	Haleakala	Pan-STARRS 1	·	1.3 km	MPC · JPL
807788	2017 RR_{94}	—	September 15, 2006	Kitt Peak	Spacewatch	·	1.3 km	MPC · JPL
807789	2017 RX_{98}	—	September 15, 2017	Haleakala	Pan-STARRS 1	·	1.2 km	MPC · JPL
807790	2017 RR_{100}	—	January 2, 2009	Kitt Peak	Spacewatch	·	1.2 km	MPC · JPL
807791	2017 RW_{101}	—	September 23, 2008	Kitt Peak	Spacewatch	·	1.5 km	MPC · JPL
807792	2017 RT_{102}	—	October 8, 2012	Mount Lemmon	Mount Lemmon Survey	·	1.2 km	MPC · JPL
807793	2017 RK_{106}	—	August 31, 2017	Mount Lemmon	Mount Lemmon Survey	·	1.6 km	MPC · JPL
807794	2017 RP_{106}	—	April 11, 2016	Haleakala	Pan-STARRS 1	DOR	1.9 km	MPC · JPL
807795	2017 RZ_{106}	—	August 31, 2017	Mount Lemmon	Mount Lemmon Survey	·	1.6 km	MPC · JPL
807796	2017 RB_{108}	—	January 19, 2015	Mount Lemmon	Mount Lemmon Survey	·	1.7 km	MPC · JPL
807797	2017 RR_{108}	—	August 31, 2017	Mount Lemmon	Mount Lemmon Survey	·	2.1 km	MPC · JPL
807798	2017 RE_{117}	—	September 14, 2017	Haleakala	Pan-STARRS 1	·	1.3 km	MPC · JPL
807799	2017 RQ_{118}	—	September 15, 2017	Haleakala	Pan-STARRS 1	·	2.2 km	MPC · JPL
807800	2017 RW_{118}	—	September 15, 2017	Haleakala	Pan-STARRS 1	T_{j} (2.98)	2.2 km	MPC · JPL

== 807801–807900 ==
back to top

Designation			Discovery			Properties		Ref
Permanent	Provisional	Named after	Date	Site	Discoverer(s)	Category	Diam.	Ref
807801	2017 RW_{119}	—	November 10, 2013	Mount Lemmon	Mount Lemmon Survey	·	1.6 km	MPC · JPL
807802	2017 RO_{120}	—	September 3, 2017	Haleakala	Pan-STARRS 1	·	1.8 km	MPC · JPL
807803	2017 RX_{120}	—	September 15, 2017	Haleakala	Pan-STARRS 1	·	520 m	MPC · JPL
807804	2017 RZ_{120}	—	March 31, 2016	Haleakala	Pan-STARRS 1	·	590 m	MPC · JPL
807805	2017 RM_{121}	—	September 12, 2017	Haleakala	Pan-STARRS 1	·	1.6 km	MPC · JPL
807806	2017 RK_{124}	—	April 18, 2015	Cerro Tololo	DECam	·	2.0 km	MPC · JPL
807807	2017 RE_{128}	—	September 15, 2017	Haleakala	Pan-STARRS 1	PAD	1.1 km	MPC · JPL
807808	2017 RJ_{129}	—	September 14, 2017	Haleakala	Pan-STARRS 1	·	1.1 km	MPC · JPL
807809	2017 RX_{130}	—	April 19, 2015	Cerro Tololo	DECam	·	1.5 km	MPC · JPL
807810	2017 RX_{131}	—	June 2, 2021	Haleakala	Pan-STARRS 1	·	1.7 km	MPC · JPL
807811	2017 RP_{132}	—	September 14, 2017	Haleakala	Pan-STARRS 1	EOS	1.3 km	MPC · JPL
807812	2017 RM_{133}	—	September 15, 2017	Haleakala	Pan-STARRS 1	KOR	1.2 km	MPC · JPL
807813	2017 RN_{135}	—	September 5, 2008	Kitt Peak	Spacewatch	·	1.3 km	MPC · JPL
807814	2017 RP_{142}	—	September 14, 2017	Haleakala	Pan-STARRS 1	·	2.1 km	MPC · JPL
807815	2017 RH_{143}	—	September 8, 2017	Haleakala	Pan-STARRS 1	·	990 m	MPC · JPL
807816	2017 RM_{151}	—	September 13, 2017	Haleakala	Pan-STARRS 1	·	1.3 km	MPC · JPL
807817	2017 RR_{151}	—	September 15, 2017	Haleakala	Pan-STARRS 1	·	1.2 km	MPC · JPL
807818	2017 RW_{151}	—	September 14, 2017	Haleakala	Pan-STARRS 1	·	1.7 km	MPC · JPL
807819	2017 RX_{151}	—	September 13, 2017	Haleakala	Pan-STARRS 1	EOS	1.1 km	MPC · JPL
807820	2017 RZ_{151}	—	September 2, 2017	Haleakala	Pan-STARRS 1	·	1.9 km	MPC · JPL
807821	2017 RU_{152}	—	September 15, 2017	Haleakala	Pan-STARRS 1	·	1.1 km	MPC · JPL
807822	2017 RD_{154}	—	January 25, 2015	Haleakala	Pan-STARRS 1	·	1.4 km	MPC · JPL
807823	2017 RQ_{154}	—	September 15, 2017	Haleakala	Pan-STARRS 1	·	1.4 km	MPC · JPL
807824	2017 RT_{154}	—	September 15, 2017	Haleakala	Pan-STARRS 1	KOR	990 m	MPC · JPL
807825	2017 RE_{155}	—	November 9, 2013	Haleakala	Pan-STARRS 1	·	1.3 km	MPC · JPL
807826	2017 RH_{156}	—	September 15, 2017	Haleakala	Pan-STARRS 1	·	1.4 km	MPC · JPL
807827	2017 RD_{157}	—	October 28, 2013	Mount Lemmon	Mount Lemmon Survey	HOF	1.9 km	MPC · JPL
807828	2017 RW_{157}	—	September 15, 2017	Haleakala	Pan-STARRS 1	KOR	820 m	MPC · JPL
807829	2017 RS_{164}	—	September 14, 2017	Haleakala	Pan-STARRS 1	·	1.6 km	MPC · JPL
807830	2017 SL_{4}	—	September 16, 2017	Haleakala	Pan-STARRS 1	·	1.9 km	MPC · JPL
807831	2017 SD_{5}	—	August 19, 2001	Cerro Tololo	Deep Ecliptic Survey	EOS	1.3 km	MPC · JPL
807832	2017 SP_{6}	—	October 6, 2012	Haleakala	Pan-STARRS 1	·	1.5 km	MPC · JPL
807833	2017 SJ_{7}	—	July 30, 2017	Haleakala	Pan-STARRS 1	·	1.8 km	MPC · JPL
807834	2017 SW_{10}	—	March 12, 2003	Palomar Mountain	NEAT	·	1.9 km	MPC · JPL
807835	2017 SA_{17}	—	May 26, 2012	Mount Lemmon	Mount Lemmon Survey	·	1.4 km	MPC · JPL
807836	2017 SL_{27}	—	August 26, 2003	Cerro Tololo	Deep Ecliptic Survey	AGN	870 m	MPC · JPL
807837	2017 SH_{28}	—	February 16, 2015	Haleakala	Pan-STARRS 1	·	1.5 km	MPC · JPL
807838	2017 SU_{28}	—	April 24, 2014	Cerro Tololo	DECam	·	2.1 km	MPC · JPL
807839	2017 SV_{28}	—	August 8, 2016	Haleakala	Pan-STARRS 1	·	1.5 km	MPC · JPL
807840	2017 ST_{34}	—	August 1, 2017	Haleakala	Pan-STARRS 1	·	1.3 km	MPC · JPL
807841	2017 SS_{35}	—	January 23, 2014	Mount Lemmon	Mount Lemmon Survey	·	1.4 km	MPC · JPL
807842	2017 SP_{36}	—	November 5, 2004	Palomar Mountain	NEAT	·	1.6 km	MPC · JPL
807843	2017 SV_{41}	—	August 1, 2017	Haleakala	Pan-STARRS 1	·	1.5 km	MPC · JPL
807844	2017 SJ_{42}	—	September 29, 2017	Haleakala	Pan-STARRS 1	·	1.9 km	MPC · JPL
807845	2017 SY_{42}	—	March 22, 2015	Haleakala	Pan-STARRS 1	·	1.8 km	MPC · JPL
807846	2017 ST_{44}	—	September 10, 2004	Socorro	LINEAR	ADE	1.5 km	MPC · JPL
807847	2017 SB_{49}	—	September 25, 2008	Mount Lemmon	Mount Lemmon Survey	NEM	1.8 km	MPC · JPL
807848	2017 SN_{49}	—	August 11, 2008	Puebla de Don Fadrique	OAM	·	1.1 km	MPC · JPL
807849	2017 SG_{52}	—	October 13, 1998	Kitt Peak	Spacewatch	KOR	1.0 km	MPC · JPL
807850	2017 SX_{52}	—	December 29, 2013	Haleakala	Pan-STARRS 1	·	1.2 km	MPC · JPL
807851	2017 SZ_{52}	—	April 18, 2015	Cerro Tololo	DECam	·	1.1 km	MPC · JPL
807852	2017 SA_{53}	—	July 30, 2017	Haleakala	Pan-STARRS 1	·	1.8 km	MPC · JPL
807853	2017 SK_{54}	—	April 5, 2016	Haleakala	Pan-STARRS 1	·	1.1 km	MPC · JPL
807854	2017 SA_{56}	—	March 14, 2016	Mount Lemmon	Mount Lemmon Survey	·	1.6 km	MPC · JPL
807855	2017 SP_{56}	—	November 5, 1999	Kitt Peak	Spacewatch	·	1.5 km	MPC · JPL
807856	2017 SA_{59}	—	October 27, 2008	Kitt Peak	Spacewatch	·	1.5 km	MPC · JPL
807857	2017 SO_{63}	—	October 4, 2004	Kitt Peak	Spacewatch	·	1.2 km	MPC · JPL
807858	2017 SV_{63}	—	November 1, 2013	Mount Lemmon	Mount Lemmon Survey	HOF	1.9 km	MPC · JPL
807859	2017 SU_{67}	—	April 21, 2015	Cerro Tololo	DECam	·	1.3 km	MPC · JPL
807860	2017 SZ_{67}	—	August 14, 2012	Haleakala	Pan-STARRS 1	KOR	1.1 km	MPC · JPL
807861	2017 SQ_{69}	—	October 11, 2012	Haleakala	Pan-STARRS 1	EOS	1.1 km	MPC · JPL
807862	2017 SX_{69}	—	August 31, 2017	Haleakala	Pan-STARRS 1	·	2.2 km	MPC · JPL
807863	2017 SK_{71}	—	March 21, 2015	Haleakala	Pan-STARRS 1	·	1.7 km	MPC · JPL
807864	2017 SL_{71}	—	January 11, 2008	Kitt Peak	Spacewatch	·	1.7 km	MPC · JPL
807865	2017 SM_{72}	—	September 17, 2017	Haleakala	Pan-STARRS 1	EOS	1.3 km	MPC · JPL
807866	2017 SE_{75}	—	September 22, 1995	Kitt Peak	Spacewatch	·	1.9 km	MPC · JPL
807867	2017 SB_{78}	—	October 11, 2012	Haleakala	Pan-STARRS 1	·	1.3 km	MPC · JPL
807868	2017 SX_{78}	—	September 17, 2017	Haleakala	Pan-STARRS 1	EOS	1.2 km	MPC · JPL
807869	2017 SG_{79}	—	August 31, 2017	Haleakala	Pan-STARRS 1	EOS	1.1 km	MPC · JPL
807870	2017 SN_{79}	—	October 18, 2004	Kitt Peak	Deep Ecliptic Survey	·	1.2 km	MPC · JPL
807871	2017 SE_{83}	—	September 17, 2017	Haleakala	Pan-STARRS 1	·	1.3 km	MPC · JPL
807872	2017 SM_{84}	—	May 30, 2016	Haleakala	Pan-STARRS 1	·	1.3 km	MPC · JPL
807873	2017 SA_{85}	—	October 8, 2008	Catalina	CSS	·	1.6 km	MPC · JPL
807874	2017 SZ_{88}	—	August 28, 2017	Mount Lemmon	Mount Lemmon Survey	·	1.1 km	MPC · JPL
807875	2017 SM_{92}	—	November 20, 2008	Kitt Peak	Spacewatch	KOR	990 m	MPC · JPL
807876	2017 SO_{92}	—	September 18, 2017	Haleakala	Pan-STARRS 1	·	1.9 km	MPC · JPL
807877	2017 SB_{93}	—	August 22, 2017	Haleakala	Pan-STARRS 1	·	1.5 km	MPC · JPL
807878	2017 SR_{96}	—	February 16, 2015	Haleakala	Pan-STARRS 1	·	1.5 km	MPC · JPL
807879	2017 SV_{102}	—	August 16, 2017	Haleakala	Pan-STARRS 1	·	1.2 km	MPC · JPL
807880	2017 SV_{103}	—	September 2, 2008	Kitt Peak	Spacewatch	·	1.2 km	MPC · JPL
807881	2017 SZ_{103}	—	December 11, 2013	Haleakala	Pan-STARRS 1	·	1.0 km	MPC · JPL
807882	2017 SG_{110}	—	October 7, 2013	Kitt Peak	Spacewatch	·	890 m	MPC · JPL
807883	2017 SP_{110}	—	April 18, 2015	Cerro Tololo	DECam	·	1.9 km	MPC · JPL
807884	2017 SJ_{116}	—	September 24, 2000	Socorro	LINEAR	·	550 m	MPC · JPL
807885	2017 ST_{118}	—	March 23, 2015	Haleakala	Pan-STARRS 1	EOS	1.1 km	MPC · JPL
807886	2017 SM_{125}	—	September 26, 2017	Haleakala	Pan-STARRS 1	·	1.7 km	MPC · JPL
807887	2017 SG_{127}	—	September 26, 2017	Haleakala	Pan-STARRS 1	·	2.0 km	MPC · JPL
807888	2017 SV_{127}	—	November 5, 2007	Kitt Peak	Spacewatch	·	630 m	MPC · JPL
807889	2017 SL_{130}	—	July 30, 2017	Haleakala	Pan-STARRS 1	·	1.9 km	MPC · JPL
807890	2017 SR_{132}	—	September 24, 2017	Haleakala	Pan-STARRS 1	·	2.0 km	MPC · JPL
807891	2017 SY_{133}	—	September 16, 2017	Haleakala	Pan-STARRS 1	·	2.1 km	MPC · JPL
807892	2017 ST_{134}	—	April 19, 2015	Cerro Tololo	DECam	·	1.7 km	MPC · JPL
807893	2017 SZ_{134}	—	April 19, 2015	Cerro Tololo	DECam	GEF	890 m	MPC · JPL
807894	2017 SB_{135}	—	September 26, 2017	Haleakala	Pan-STARRS 1	EOS	1.2 km	MPC · JPL
807895	2017 SE_{135}	—	September 19, 2017	Haleakala	Pan-STARRS 1	·	2.1 km	MPC · JPL
807896	2017 SN_{137}	—	September 30, 2017	Haleakala	Pan-STARRS 1	·	1.7 km	MPC · JPL
807897	2017 SX_{143}	—	October 19, 2006	Catalina	CSS	·	2.5 km	MPC · JPL
807898	2017 SF_{144}	—	September 18, 2017	Haleakala	Pan-STARRS 1	·	2.2 km	MPC · JPL
807899	2017 SX_{144}	—	September 30, 2017	Haleakala	Pan-STARRS 1	·	2.1 km	MPC · JPL
807900	2017 SJ_{145}	—	September 19, 2017	Haleakala	Pan-STARRS 1	EOS	1.2 km	MPC · JPL

== 807901–808000 ==
back to top

Designation			Discovery			Properties		Ref
Permanent	Provisional	Named after	Date	Site	Discoverer(s)	Category	Diam.	Ref
807901	2017 SF_{146}	—	September 24, 2017	Haleakala	Pan-STARRS 1	·	1.5 km	MPC · JPL
807902	2017 SP_{151}	—	September 19, 2017	Haleakala	Pan-STARRS 1	·	2.1 km	MPC · JPL
807903	2017 SY_{151}	—	September 30, 2017	Haleakala	Pan-STARRS 1	·	1.5 km	MPC · JPL
807904	2017 SK_{152}	—	September 26, 2017	Haleakala	Pan-STARRS 1	EOS	1.2 km	MPC · JPL
807905	2017 SV_{154}	—	May 19, 2015	Haleakala	Pan-STARRS 1	EOS	1.4 km	MPC · JPL
807906	2017 SV_{163}	—	September 22, 2017	Haleakala	Pan-STARRS 1	·	2.4 km	MPC · JPL
807907	2017 SP_{168}	—	May 21, 2015	Cerro Tololo	DECam	·	2.0 km	MPC · JPL
807908	2017 SZ_{172}	—	September 30, 2017	Haleakala	Pan-STARRS 1	EOS	1.2 km	MPC · JPL
807909	2017 SB_{180}	—	September 17, 2017	Haleakala	Pan-STARRS 1	·	1.6 km	MPC · JPL
807910	2017 SM_{181}	—	September 24, 2017	Haleakala	Pan-STARRS 1	·	2.1 km	MPC · JPL
807911	2017 SB_{188}	—	January 16, 2015	Haleakala	Pan-STARRS 1	·	1.5 km	MPC · JPL
807912	2017 SN_{188}	—	September 22, 2017	Haleakala	Pan-STARRS 1	·	3.2 km	MPC · JPL
807913	2017 SW_{188}	—	September 21, 2017	Haleakala	Pan-STARRS 1	·	1.9 km	MPC · JPL
807914	2017 SZ_{188}	—	May 20, 2015	Cerro Tololo	DECam	·	2.0 km	MPC · JPL
807915	2017 SB_{189}	—	September 16, 2017	Haleakala	Pan-STARRS 1	·	1.3 km	MPC · JPL
807916	2017 SC_{189}	—	September 26, 2017	Haleakala	Pan-STARRS 1	EOS	1.3 km	MPC · JPL
807917	2017 SG_{189}	—	September 17, 2017	Haleakala	Pan-STARRS 1	·	2.2 km	MPC · JPL
807918	2017 SL_{189}	—	September 21, 2017	Haleakala	Pan-STARRS 1	EOS	1.4 km	MPC · JPL
807919	2017 SM_{189}	—	September 30, 2017	Haleakala	Pan-STARRS 1	·	1.6 km	MPC · JPL
807920	2017 SR_{189}	—	September 24, 2017	Haleakala	Pan-STARRS 1	·	1.7 km	MPC · JPL
807921	2017 SW_{189}	—	September 24, 2017	Haleakala	Pan-STARRS 1	EOS	1.2 km	MPC · JPL
807922	2017 SX_{189}	—	April 23, 2014	Cerro Tololo	DECam	·	1.7 km	MPC · JPL
807923	2017 SL_{190}	—	September 21, 2017	Haleakala	Pan-STARRS 1	·	1.7 km	MPC · JPL
807924	2017 SO_{191}	—	September 19, 2017	Haleakala	Pan-STARRS 1	(1118)	2.3 km	MPC · JPL
807925	2017 SZ_{193}	—	February 17, 2015	Haleakala	Pan-STARRS 1	·	1.4 km	MPC · JPL
807926	2017 SM_{196}	—	September 29, 2017	Haleakala	Pan-STARRS 1	·	2.1 km	MPC · JPL
807927	2017 SA_{197}	—	October 16, 2012	Mount Lemmon	Mount Lemmon Survey	·	1.5 km	MPC · JPL
807928	2017 SC_{197}	—	September 17, 2017	Haleakala	Pan-STARRS 1	·	1.4 km	MPC · JPL
807929	2017 SK_{197}	—	September 25, 2017	Haleakala	Pan-STARRS 1	·	1.7 km	MPC · JPL
807930	2017 SJ_{199}	—	September 23, 2017	Haleakala	Pan-STARRS 1	·	1.6 km	MPC · JPL
807931	2017 SS_{199}	—	September 24, 2017	Haleakala	Pan-STARRS 1	·	2.1 km	MPC · JPL
807932	2017 SE_{200}	—	September 23, 2017	Haleakala	Pan-STARRS 1	·	1.4 km	MPC · JPL
807933	2017 SN_{200}	—	September 24, 2017	Haleakala	Pan-STARRS 1	·	1.3 km	MPC · JPL
807934	2017 SR_{200}	—	September 16, 2017	Haleakala	Pan-STARRS 1	WIT	730 m	MPC · JPL
807935	2017 SX_{200}	—	September 23, 2017	Haleakala	Pan-STARRS 1	·	2.1 km	MPC · JPL
807936	2017 SA_{201}	—	September 24, 2017	Haleakala	Pan-STARRS 1	·	520 m	MPC · JPL
807937	2017 SL_{201}	—	September 17, 2017	Haleakala	Pan-STARRS 1	HOF	1.9 km	MPC · JPL
807938	2017 ST_{201}	—	April 18, 2015	Cerro Tololo	DECam	·	1.6 km	MPC · JPL
807939	2017 SX_{201}	—	September 30, 2017	Haleakala	Pan-STARRS 1	·	1.6 km	MPC · JPL
807940	2017 SB_{202}	—	September 24, 2017	Mount Lemmon	Mount Lemmon Survey	·	2.2 km	MPC · JPL
807941	2017 SD_{202}	—	September 29, 2017	Kitt Peak	Spacewatch	·	1.8 km	MPC · JPL
807942	2017 SO_{202}	—	April 18, 2015	Cerro Tololo	DECam	·	1.7 km	MPC · JPL
807943	2017 SU_{202}	—	September 29, 2017	Haleakala	Pan-STARRS 1	EOS	1.3 km	MPC · JPL
807944	2017 SA_{203}	—	September 23, 2017	Haleakala	Pan-STARRS 1	·	1.7 km	MPC · JPL
807945	2017 SX_{203}	—	September 23, 2017	Haleakala	Pan-STARRS 1	EOS	1.4 km	MPC · JPL
807946	2017 SC_{204}	—	September 21, 2017	Haleakala	Pan-STARRS 1	·	2.2 km	MPC · JPL
807947	2017 SE_{204}	—	September 23, 2017	Haleakala	Pan-STARRS 1	·	1.6 km	MPC · JPL
807948	2017 ST_{204}	—	September 22, 2017	Haleakala	Pan-STARRS 1	·	1.2 km	MPC · JPL
807949	2017 SY_{205}	—	September 30, 2017	Haleakala	Pan-STARRS 1	·	1.4 km	MPC · JPL
807950	2017 SQ_{206}	—	September 29, 2017	Haleakala	Pan-STARRS 1	·	1.2 km	MPC · JPL
807951	2017 SQ_{207}	—	September 23, 2017	Haleakala	Pan-STARRS 1	KOR	1.0 km	MPC · JPL
807952	2017 SU_{207}	—	September 30, 2017	Haleakala	Pan-STARRS 1	·	2.5 km	MPC · JPL
807953	2017 SH_{208}	—	September 22, 2017	Haleakala	Pan-STARRS 1	·	1.5 km	MPC · JPL
807954	2017 SM_{208}	—	September 30, 2017	Haleakala	Pan-STARRS 1	VER	2.0 km	MPC · JPL
807955	2017 SN_{208}	—	June 18, 2015	Haleakala	Pan-STARRS 1	·	1.9 km	MPC · JPL
807956	2017 SY_{208}	—	September 25, 2017	Haleakala	Pan-STARRS 1	·	1.6 km	MPC · JPL
807957	2017 SM_{209}	—	September 24, 2017	Haleakala	Pan-STARRS 1	·	2.4 km	MPC · JPL
807958	2017 SN_{209}	—	September 30, 2017	Haleakala	Pan-STARRS 1	·	1.9 km	MPC · JPL
807959	2017 SY_{209}	—	March 29, 2015	Haleakala	Pan-STARRS 1	·	1.4 km	MPC · JPL
807960	2017 SG_{210}	—	September 23, 2017	Haleakala	Pan-STARRS 1	·	1.7 km	MPC · JPL
807961	2017 SK_{210}	—	September 23, 2017	Haleakala	Pan-STARRS 1	KOR	990 m	MPC · JPL
807962	2017 SH_{212}	—	September 23, 2017	Haleakala	Pan-STARRS 1	·	1.7 km	MPC · JPL
807963	2017 SG_{213}	—	September 25, 2017	Haleakala	Pan-STARRS 1	AGN	840 m	MPC · JPL
807964	2017 SD_{215}	—	September 26, 2017	Haleakala	Pan-STARRS 1	·	1.7 km	MPC · JPL
807965	2017 SP_{218}	—	September 19, 2017	Haleakala	Pan-STARRS 1	KOR	900 m	MPC · JPL
807966	2017 SU_{218}	—	September 24, 2017	Haleakala	Pan-STARRS 1	·	1.8 km	MPC · JPL
807967	2017 SV_{218}	—	September 26, 2017	Haleakala	Pan-STARRS 1	HOF	1.9 km	MPC · JPL
807968	2017 SQ_{219}	—	December 25, 2013	Mount Lemmon	Mount Lemmon Survey	·	1.3 km	MPC · JPL
807969	2017 SF_{220}	—	September 26, 2017	Haleakala	Pan-STARRS 1	·	1.5 km	MPC · JPL
807970	2017 SO_{220}	—	September 26, 2017	Haleakala	Pan-STARRS 1	EOS	1.2 km	MPC · JPL
807971	2017 SG_{221}	—	May 20, 2015	Cerro Tololo	DECam	·	1.9 km	MPC · JPL
807972	2017 SM_{221}	—	April 18, 2015	Cerro Tololo	DECam	EOS	1.2 km	MPC · JPL
807973	2017 SU_{221}	—	August 3, 2016	Haleakala	Pan-STARRS 1	·	2.1 km	MPC · JPL
807974	2017 SP_{223}	—	April 14, 2015	Mount Lemmon	Mount Lemmon Survey	KOR	980 m	MPC · JPL
807975	2017 SE_{224}	—	September 26, 2017	Haleakala	Pan-STARRS 1	KOR	850 m	MPC · JPL
807976	2017 SL_{224}	—	September 19, 2017	Haleakala	Pan-STARRS 1	·	1.4 km	MPC · JPL
807977	2017 SY_{225}	—	September 25, 2017	Haleakala	Pan-STARRS 1	EOS	1.1 km	MPC · JPL
807978	2017 SM_{226}	—	September 24, 2017	Mount Lemmon	Mount Lemmon Survey	·	770 m	MPC · JPL
807979	2017 SV_{226}	—	September 25, 2017	Haleakala	Pan-STARRS 1	·	1.8 km	MPC · JPL
807980	2017 SW_{228}	—	May 19, 2015	Cerro Tololo	DECam	EMA	1.8 km	MPC · JPL
807981	2017 SM_{234}	—	September 16, 2017	Haleakala	Pan-STARRS 1	·	1.5 km	MPC · JPL
807982	2017 SE_{237}	—	September 21, 2017	Haleakala	Pan-STARRS 1	EUP	2.1 km	MPC · JPL
807983	2017 SG_{238}	—	September 24, 2017	Mount Lemmon	Mount Lemmon Survey	·	1.7 km	MPC · JPL
807984	2017 SP_{239}	—	September 17, 2017	Haleakala	Pan-STARRS 1	·	960 m	MPC · JPL
807985	2017 SW_{239}	—	September 21, 2017	Haleakala	Pan-STARRS 1	·	1.7 km	MPC · JPL
807986	2017 SN_{242}	—	September 26, 2017	Haleakala	Pan-STARRS 1	·	1.9 km	MPC · JPL
807987	2017 SQ_{242}	—	September 17, 2017	Haleakala	Pan-STARRS 1	·	940 m	MPC · JPL
807988	2017 SJ_{243}	—	May 22, 2015	Cerro Tololo	DECam	·	1.8 km	MPC · JPL
807989	2017 SL_{243}	—	September 25, 2017	Haleakala	Pan-STARRS 1	·	2.3 km	MPC · JPL
807990	2017 ST_{243}	—	September 25, 2017	Haleakala	Pan-STARRS 1	·	2.0 km	MPC · JPL
807991	2017 SB_{245}	—	September 26, 2017	Haleakala	Pan-STARRS 1	·	2.2 km	MPC · JPL
807992	2017 SK_{249}	—	February 28, 2014	Haleakala	Pan-STARRS 1	EOS	1.3 km	MPC · JPL
807993	2017 SL_{249}	—	September 26, 2017	Haleakala	Pan-STARRS 1	KOR	850 m	MPC · JPL
807994	2017 SU_{249}	—	September 19, 2017	Haleakala	Pan-STARRS 1	·	1.4 km	MPC · JPL
807995	2017 SW_{249}	—	September 26, 2017	Haleakala	Pan-STARRS 1	EOS	1.3 km	MPC · JPL
807996	2017 SK_{251}	—	September 25, 2017	Haleakala	Pan-STARRS 1	·	2.1 km	MPC · JPL
807997	2017 SO_{252}	—	September 25, 2017	Haleakala	Pan-STARRS 1	EOS	1.2 km	MPC · JPL
807998	2017 SA_{253}	—	September 18, 2017	Haleakala	Pan-STARRS 1	·	1.1 km	MPC · JPL
807999	2017 ST_{253}	—	September 27, 2017	Haleakala	Pan-STARRS 1	·	1.9 km	MPC · JPL
808000	2017 SK_{254}	—	September 19, 2017	Haleakala	Pan-STARRS 1	JUN	490 m	MPC · JPL

back to top

== Meaning of names ==
As minor planet discoveries are confirmed, they are given a permanent number by the IAU's Minor Planet Center (MPC), and the discoverers can then submit names for them, following the IAU's naming conventions. The list below concerns those minor planets in the specified number-range that have received names, and explains the meanings of those names.

Official naming citations of newly named small Solar System bodies are approved and published in a bulletin by IAU's Working Group for Small Bodies Nomenclature (WGSBN). Before May 2021, citations were published in MPC's Minor Planet Circulars for many decades. Recent citations can also be found on the JPL Small-Body Database (SBDB). Until his death in 2016, German astronomer Lutz D. Schmadel compiled these citations into the Dictionary of Minor Planet Names (DMP) and regularly updated the collection.

Based on Paul Herget's The Names of the Minor Planets, Schmadel also researched the unclear origin of numerous asteroids, most of which had been named prior to World War II. This article incorporates text from this source, which is in the public domain: SBDB New namings may only be added to this list below after official publication as the preannouncement of names is condemned. The WGSBN publishes a comprehensive guideline for the naming rules of non-cometary small Solar System bodies.

Named minor planet	Provisional	This minor planet was named for...	Ref · Catalog
807057 Georgescutavi	2017 EY_{32}	Octavian (Tavi) Georgescu, a Romanian physics and astronomy teacher at Carol I National College in Craiova.	IAU · 807057
807098 Chensong	2017 FJ_{70}	Chen Song, Chinese amateur astronomer from Hangzhou, Zhejiang.	IAU · 807098
807579 Yasuhiroyasuko	2017 OV_{199}	Yasuhiro Sasaki, Japanese amateur astronomer who has been engaged in astronomy outreach, organizing stargazing events and similar activities for local citizens.	IAU · 807579
