= List of minor planets: 808001–809000 =

The following is a partial list of minor planets, running from minor-planet number 808001 through 809000, inclusive. The primary data for this and other partial lists is based on JPL's "Small-Body Orbital Elements" and data available from the Minor Planet Center. Critical list information is also provided by the MPC, unless otherwise specified from Lowell Observatory. A detailed description of the table's columns and additional sources are given on the main page including a complete list of every page in this series, and a statistical break-up on the dynamical classification of minor planets.

Also see the summary list of all named bodies in numerical and alphabetical order, and the corresponding naming citations for the number range of this particular list. New namings may only be added to this list after official publication, as the preannouncement of names is condemned by the Working Group for Small Bodies Nomenclature of the International Astronomical Union.

Near-Earth obj.	MBA (inner)	MBA (outer)	Centaur
Mars-crosser	MBA (middle)	Jupiter trojan	Trans-Neptunian obj.
Unclassified

== 808001–808100 ==
Designation			Discovery			Properties		Ref
Permanent	Provisional	Named after	Date	Site	Discoverer(s)	Category	Diam.	Ref
808001	2017 ST_{254}	—	September 29, 2017	Haleakala	Pan-STARRS 1	·	1.2 km	MPC · JPL
808002	2017 SU_{254}	—	September 17, 2017	Haleakala	Pan-STARRS 1	·	1.4 km	MPC · JPL
808003	2017 SC_{255}	—	September 23, 2017	Haleakala	Pan-STARRS 1	THM	1.9 km	MPC · JPL
808004	2017 SX_{255}	—	September 21, 2017	Haleakala	Pan-STARRS 1	·	1.9 km	MPC · JPL
808005	2017 SZ_{255}	—	September 19, 2017	Haleakala	Pan-STARRS 1	·	1.2 km	MPC · JPL
808006	2017 SB_{256}	—	September 19, 2017	Haleakala	Pan-STARRS 1	·	1.4 km	MPC · JPL
808007	2017 SR_{256}	—	September 17, 2017	Haleakala	Pan-STARRS 1	·	1.3 km	MPC · JPL
808008	2017 SU_{256}	—	September 22, 2017	Haleakala	Pan-STARRS 1	·	1.0 km	MPC · JPL
808009	2017 SX_{257}	—	September 17, 2017	Haleakala	Pan-STARRS 1	·	1.2 km	MPC · JPL
808010	2017 SZ_{258}	—	September 19, 2017	Haleakala	Pan-STARRS 1	·	590 m	MPC · JPL
808011	2017 SE_{259}	—	September 19, 2017	Haleakala	Pan-STARRS 1	EOS	1.2 km	MPC · JPL
808012	2017 SJ_{259}	—	September 26, 2017	Haleakala	Pan-STARRS 1	·	2.0 km	MPC · JPL
808013	2017 SX_{259}	—	April 18, 2015	Cerro Tololo	DECam	·	1.3 km	MPC · JPL
808014	2017 SD_{260}	—	September 24, 2017	Haleakala	Pan-STARRS 1	·	1.7 km	MPC · JPL
808015	2017 SP_{260}	—	September 16, 2017	Haleakala	Pan-STARRS 1	·	2.0 km	MPC · JPL
808016	2017 SQ_{261}	—	May 20, 2015	Cerro Tololo	DECam	·	1.7 km	MPC · JPL
808017	2017 SX_{261}	—	September 26, 2017	Haleakala	Pan-STARRS 1	·	2.1 km	MPC · JPL
808018	2017 SC_{262}	—	February 23, 1998	Kitt Peak	Spacewatch	·	660 m	MPC · JPL
808019	2017 SP_{263}	—	September 26, 2017	Haleakala	Pan-STARRS 1	·	1.3 km	MPC · JPL
808020	2017 SU_{263}	—	September 25, 2017	Haleakala	Pan-STARRS 1	·	1.4 km	MPC · JPL
808021	2017 SV_{264}	—	September 21, 2017	Haleakala	Pan-STARRS 1	·	1.7 km	MPC · JPL
808022	2017 SC_{265}	—	September 26, 2017	Haleakala	Pan-STARRS 1	·	990 m	MPC · JPL
808023	2017 SU_{275}	—	September 26, 2017	Haleakala	Pan-STARRS 1	AGN	820 m	MPC · JPL
808024	2017 SQ_{276}	—	September 29, 2017	Haleakala	Pan-STARRS 1	·	740 m	MPC · JPL
808025	2017 SJ_{278}	—	September 25, 2017	Haleakala	Pan-STARRS 1	AGN	840 m	MPC · JPL
808026	2017 SX_{280}	—	September 23, 2017	Haleakala	Pan-STARRS 1	AGN	760 m	MPC · JPL
808027	2017 SH_{288}	—	September 30, 2017	Haleakala	Pan-STARRS 1	·	2.0 km	MPC · JPL
808028	2017 SP_{292}	—	September 19, 2017	Haleakala	Pan-STARRS 1	·	1.9 km	MPC · JPL
808029	2017 SG_{294}	—	September 16, 2017	Haleakala	Pan-STARRS 1	·	1.7 km	MPC · JPL
808030	2017 SD_{295}	—	September 26, 2017	Haleakala	Pan-STARRS 1	·	2.0 km	MPC · JPL
808031	2017 SE_{295}	—	April 19, 2015	Cerro Tololo	DECam	·	1.9 km	MPC · JPL
808032	2017 SG_{295}	—	September 21, 2017	Haleakala	Pan-STARRS 1	·	1.9 km	MPC · JPL
808033	2017 SU_{298}	—	September 19, 2017	Haleakala	Pan-STARRS 1	·	1.2 km	MPC · JPL
808034	2017 SV_{298}	—	September 17, 2017	Haleakala	Pan-STARRS 1	·	1.3 km	MPC · JPL
808035	2017 SX_{304}	—	September 17, 2017	Haleakala	Pan-STARRS 1	HNS	700 m	MPC · JPL
808036	2017 SV_{306}	—	September 30, 2017	Mount Lemmon	Mount Lemmon Survey	·	1.9 km	MPC · JPL
808037	2017 SZ_{306}	—	September 16, 2017	Haleakala	Pan-STARRS 1	·	2.2 km	MPC · JPL
808038	2017 ST_{308}	—	September 17, 2017	Haleakala	Pan-STARRS 1	KOR	1.1 km	MPC · JPL
808039	2017 SF_{312}	—	April 20, 2009	Kitt Peak	Spacewatch	·	2.1 km	MPC · JPL
808040	2017 SA_{320}	—	January 28, 2014	Mount Lemmon	Mount Lemmon Survey	·	2.3 km	MPC · JPL
808041	2017 SX_{324}	—	September 16, 2017	Haleakala	Pan-STARRS 1	TRE	1.9 km	MPC · JPL
808042	2017 SB_{326}	—	September 21, 2017	Haleakala	Pan-STARRS 1	·	1.7 km	MPC · JPL
808043	2017 SP_{326}	—	September 30, 2017	Haleakala	Pan-STARRS 1	·	2.0 km	MPC · JPL
808044	2017 SJ_{328}	—	September 22, 2017	Haleakala	Pan-STARRS 1	·	1.7 km	MPC · JPL
808045	2017 SP_{328}	—	September 26, 2017	Haleakala	Pan-STARRS 1	EOS	1.3 km	MPC · JPL
808046	2017 SL_{329}	—	September 21, 2017	Haleakala	Pan-STARRS 1	·	1.4 km	MPC · JPL
808047	2017 SR_{330}	—	September 25, 2017	Haleakala	Pan-STARRS 1	EOS	1.2 km	MPC · JPL
808048	2017 SB_{331}	—	September 16, 2017	Haleakala	Pan-STARRS 1	EOS	1.3 km	MPC · JPL
808049	2017 SN_{332}	—	September 25, 2017	Haleakala	Pan-STARRS 1	·	1.6 km	MPC · JPL
808050	2017 SP_{334}	—	September 17, 2017	Haleakala	Pan-STARRS 1	·	2.3 km	MPC · JPL
808051	2017 SX_{334}	—	September 22, 2017	Haleakala	Pan-STARRS 1	·	1.8 km	MPC · JPL
808052	2017 SY_{334}	—	September 30, 2017	Haleakala	Pan-STARRS 1	·	1.9 km	MPC · JPL
808053	2017 SL_{336}	—	September 21, 2017	Haleakala	Pan-STARRS 1	·	1.6 km	MPC · JPL
808054	2017 SN_{337}	—	September 17, 2017	Haleakala	Pan-STARRS 1	·	1.3 km	MPC · JPL
808055	2017 SD_{338}	—	September 28, 2017	Mount Lemmon	Mount Lemmon Survey	·	1.5 km	MPC · JPL
808056	2017 SK_{339}	—	April 29, 2011	Mount Lemmon	Mount Lemmon Survey	·	1.4 km	MPC · JPL
808057	2017 SL_{340}	—	September 24, 2017	Haleakala	Pan-STARRS 1	·	2.3 km	MPC · JPL
808058	2017 SG_{342}	—	September 25, 2017	Haleakala	Pan-STARRS 1	·	1.4 km	MPC · JPL
808059	2017 SU_{342}	—	September 24, 2017	Haleakala	Pan-STARRS 1	KOR	910 m	MPC · JPL
808060	2017 SQ_{345}	—	September 16, 2017	Haleakala	Pan-STARRS 1	·	1.3 km	MPC · JPL
808061	2017 SV_{345}	—	September 23, 2017	Haleakala	Pan-STARRS 1	·	1.4 km	MPC · JPL
808062	2017 SA_{347}	—	September 16, 2017	Haleakala	Pan-STARRS 1	·	1.4 km	MPC · JPL
808063	2017 SD_{347}	—	September 29, 2017	Kitt Peak	Spacewatch	·	1.9 km	MPC · JPL
808064	2017 SG_{352}	—	September 19, 2017	Haleakala	Pan-STARRS 1	EOS	1.0 km	MPC · JPL
808065	2017 SE_{353}	—	September 17, 2017	Haleakala	Pan-STARRS 1	·	1.4 km	MPC · JPL
808066	2017 SE_{354}	—	September 26, 2017	Haleakala	Pan-STARRS 1	·	1.3 km	MPC · JPL
808067	2017 SA_{360}	—	October 11, 2012	Haleakala	Pan-STARRS 1	EOS	1.0 km	MPC · JPL
808068	2017 SP_{363}	—	September 16, 2017	Haleakala	Pan-STARRS 1	EOS	1.3 km	MPC · JPL
808069	2017 SJ_{364}	—	September 25, 2017	Haleakala	Pan-STARRS 1	·	1.7 km	MPC · JPL
808070	2017 SN_{364}	—	September 17, 2017	Haleakala	Pan-STARRS 1	TIR	1.7 km	MPC · JPL
808071	2017 SL_{365}	—	September 23, 2017	Haleakala	Pan-STARRS 1	·	1.8 km	MPC · JPL
808072	2017 SA_{366}	—	December 11, 2012	Mount Lemmon	Mount Lemmon Survey	LIX	2.2 km	MPC · JPL
808073	2017 SF_{367}	—	September 17, 2017	Haleakala	Pan-STARRS 1	·	1.6 km	MPC · JPL
808074	2017 SA_{373}	—	September 26, 2017	Haleakala	Pan-STARRS 1	·	1.7 km	MPC · JPL
808075	2017 SH_{373}	—	September 25, 2017	Haleakala	Pan-STARRS 1	·	1.6 km	MPC · JPL
808076	2017 SL_{373}	—	September 25, 2017	Haleakala	Pan-STARRS 1	·	1.3 km	MPC · JPL
808077	2017 SM_{381}	—	January 28, 2015	Haleakala	Pan-STARRS 1	·	810 m	MPC · JPL
808078	2017 SQ_{400}	—	September 23, 2017	Haleakala	Pan-STARRS 1	·	2.0 km	MPC · JPL
808079	2017 ST_{400}	—	September 16, 2017	Haleakala	Pan-STARRS 1	·	1.9 km	MPC · JPL
808080	2017 SW_{400}	—	September 16, 2017	Haleakala	Pan-STARRS 1	·	2.2 km	MPC · JPL
808081	2017 SA_{401}	—	September 22, 2017	Haleakala	Pan-STARRS 1	·	2.1 km	MPC · JPL
808082	2017 TF_{7}	—	February 18, 2015	Haleakala	Pan-STARRS 1	TEL	1.5 km	MPC · JPL
808083	2017 TP_{8}	—	October 15, 2003	Anderson Mesa	LONEOS	·	570 m	MPC · JPL
808084	2017 TV_{8}	—	September 24, 2008	Mount Lemmon	Mount Lemmon Survey	·	1.2 km	MPC · JPL
808085	2017 TQ_{11}	—	October 6, 2008	Mount Lemmon	Mount Lemmon Survey	·	1.5 km	MPC · JPL
808086	2017 TO_{14}	—	September 14, 2017	Haleakala	Pan-STARRS 1	·	2.3 km	MPC · JPL
808087	2017 TF_{16}	—	October 11, 2017	Mount Lemmon	Mount Lemmon Survey	·	1.9 km	MPC · JPL
808088	2017 TQ_{23}	—	October 15, 2017	Mount Lemmon	Mount Lemmon Survey	·	2.0 km	MPC · JPL
808089	2017 TS_{23}	—	October 14, 2017	Mount Lemmon	Mount Lemmon Survey	THB	2.1 km	MPC · JPL
808090	2017 TT_{23}	—	October 10, 2017	Haleakala	Pan-STARRS 1	·	2.5 km	MPC · JPL
808091	2017 TY_{24}	—	October 14, 2017	Mount Lemmon	Mount Lemmon Survey	·	1.4 km	MPC · JPL
808092	2017 TH_{25}	—	April 14, 2015	Mount Lemmon	Mount Lemmon Survey	·	1.5 km	MPC · JPL
808093	2017 TP_{25}	—	October 12, 2017	Mount Lemmon	Mount Lemmon Survey	·	1.7 km	MPC · JPL
808094	2017 TY_{26}	—	October 1, 2017	Mount Lemmon	Mount Lemmon Survey	·	2.1 km	MPC · JPL
808095	2017 TC_{27}	—	October 15, 2012	Haleakala	Pan-STARRS 1	·	1.6 km	MPC · JPL
808096	2017 TP_{27}	—	October 15, 2017	Mount Lemmon	Mount Lemmon Survey	·	2.2 km	MPC · JPL
808097	2017 TL_{29}	—	October 1, 2017	Haleakala	Pan-STARRS 1	·	1.5 km	MPC · JPL
808098	2017 TP_{30}	—	May 20, 2015	Cerro Tololo	DECam	·	1.8 km	MPC · JPL
808099	2017 TS_{30}	—	October 12, 2017	Mount Lemmon	Mount Lemmon Survey	·	1.7 km	MPC · JPL
808100	2017 TD_{31}	—	May 20, 2015	Cerro Tololo	DECam	·	1.4 km	MPC · JPL

== 808101–808200 ==
back to top

Designation			Discovery			Properties		Ref
Permanent	Provisional	Named after	Date	Site	Discoverer(s)	Category	Diam.	Ref
808101	2017 TL_{32}	—	October 15, 2017	Mount Lemmon	Mount Lemmon Survey	EOS	1.1 km	MPC · JPL
808102	2017 TA_{35}	—	October 1, 2017	Haleakala	Pan-STARRS 1	EOS	1.2 km	MPC · JPL
808103	2017 TY_{35}	—	October 10, 2017	Haleakala	Pan-STARRS 1	·	2.4 km	MPC · JPL
808104	2017 TC_{36}	—	October 14, 2017	Mount Lemmon	Mount Lemmon Survey	·	2.7 km	MPC · JPL
808105	2017 TV_{36}	—	October 1, 2017	Mount Lemmon	Mount Lemmon Survey	·	2.3 km	MPC · JPL
808106	2017 TF_{37}	—	April 19, 2015	Cerro Tololo	DECam	EOS	1.3 km	MPC · JPL
808107	2017 TJ_{41}	—	October 15, 2017	Mount Lemmon	Mount Lemmon Survey	·	1.1 km	MPC · JPL
808108	2017 TG_{46}	—	October 15, 2017	Mount Lemmon	Mount Lemmon Survey	·	2.0 km	MPC · JPL
808109	2017 TF_{48}	—	October 14, 2017	Mount Lemmon	Mount Lemmon Survey	·	2.2 km	MPC · JPL
808110	2017 TG_{50}	—	October 13, 2017	Mount Lemmon	Mount Lemmon Survey	·	1.7 km	MPC · JPL
808111	2017 UN_{4}	—	January 11, 2011	Mount Lemmon	Mount Lemmon Survey	·	580 m	MPC · JPL
808112	2017 UQ_{16}	—	February 27, 2015	Haleakala	Pan-STARRS 1	KOR	1.2 km	MPC · JPL
808113	2017 UN_{17}	—	March 23, 2015	Kitt Peak	L. H. Wasserman, M. W. Buie	·	1.2 km	MPC · JPL
808114	2017 UE_{21}	—	November 25, 2011	Haleakala	Pan-STARRS 1	·	560 m	MPC · JPL
808115	2017 UW_{22}	—	September 20, 2008	Kitt Peak	Spacewatch	·	1.5 km	MPC · JPL
808116	2017 UL_{25}	—	October 1, 2006	Kitt Peak	Spacewatch	·	1.8 km	MPC · JPL
808117	2017 UC_{35}	—	April 11, 2015	Mount Lemmon	Mount Lemmon Survey	·	3.2 km	MPC · JPL
808118	2017 UQ_{37}	—	August 27, 2012	Haleakala	Pan-STARRS 1	·	1.5 km	MPC · JPL
808119	2017 US_{38}	—	April 24, 2012	Haleakala	Pan-STARRS 1	·	1.3 km	MPC · JPL
808120	2017 UX_{40}	—	May 18, 2015	Haleakala	Pan-STARRS 1	·	2.3 km	MPC · JPL
808121	2017 UY_{40}	—	May 21, 2015	Cerro Tololo	DECam	·	1.9 km	MPC · JPL
808122	2017 UJ_{45}	—	October 1, 2017	Haleakala	Pan-STARRS 1	EUN	820 m	MPC · JPL
808123	2017 UT_{47}	—	September 24, 2017	Haleakala	Pan-STARRS 1	·	1.3 km	MPC · JPL
808124	2017 UQ_{49}	—	August 7, 2016	Haleakala	Pan-STARRS 1	·	1.9 km	MPC · JPL
808125	2017 UW_{49}	—	July 5, 2016	Haleakala	Pan-STARRS 1	·	2.4 km	MPC · JPL
808126	2017 UX_{52}	—	October 17, 2017	Mount Lemmon	Mount Lemmon Survey	T_{j} (2.93)	2.5 km	MPC · JPL
808127	2017 UL_{54}	—	October 22, 2017	Mount Lemmon	Mount Lemmon Survey	TIR	2.1 km	MPC · JPL
808128	2017 UQ_{54}	—	October 26, 2017	Mount Lemmon	Mount Lemmon Survey	·	2.3 km	MPC · JPL
808129	2017 UT_{54}	—	November 16, 2000	Kitt Peak	Spacewatch	·	2.0 km	MPC · JPL
808130	2017 UZ_{55}	—	October 16, 2017	Mount Lemmon	Mount Lemmon Survey	·	2.1 km	MPC · JPL
808131	2017 UC_{57}	—	April 23, 2014	Cerro Tololo	DECam	T_{j} (2.99)	2.5 km	MPC · JPL
808132	2017 UK_{58}	—	October 27, 2017	Mount Lemmon	Mount Lemmon Survey	·	2.0 km	MPC · JPL
808133	2017 UT_{62}	—	October 20, 2017	Mount Lemmon	Mount Lemmon Survey	·	1.9 km	MPC · JPL
808134	2017 UF_{63}	—	April 18, 2015	Cerro Tololo	DECam	EOS	1.5 km	MPC · JPL
808135	2017 UE_{66}	—	October 28, 2017	Haleakala	Pan-STARRS 1	·	2.1 km	MPC · JPL
808136	2017 UH_{66}	—	October 18, 2017	Haleakala	Pan-STARRS 1	GEF	920 m	MPC · JPL
808137	2017 UA_{67}	—	September 23, 2001	Kitt Peak	Spacewatch	·	1.3 km	MPC · JPL
808138	2017 UR_{67}	—	October 28, 2017	Haleakala	Pan-STARRS 1	·	1.6 km	MPC · JPL
808139	2017 UG_{74}	—	October 23, 2006	Mount Lemmon	Mount Lemmon Survey	LIX	2.4 km	MPC · JPL
808140	2017 UT_{75}	—	October 23, 2017	Mount Lemmon	Mount Lemmon Survey	·	1.9 km	MPC · JPL
808141	2017 UT_{78}	—	November 14, 2006	Kitt Peak	Spacewatch	·	2.0 km	MPC · JPL
808142	2017 UP_{83}	—	October 27, 2017	Mount Lemmon	Mount Lemmon Survey	EOS	1.1 km	MPC · JPL
808143	2017 UN_{86}	—	October 19, 2006	Kitt Peak	Spacewatch	EUP	2.0 km	MPC · JPL
808144	2017 UL_{87}	—	October 22, 2017	Kitt Peak	Spacewatch	·	2.5 km	MPC · JPL
808145	2017 UV_{87}	—	October 21, 2017	Mount Lemmon	Mount Lemmon Survey	·	2.1 km	MPC · JPL
808146	2017 UY_{87}	—	April 18, 2015	Cerro Tololo	DECam	EOS	1.5 km	MPC · JPL
808147	2017 UL_{88}	—	October 22, 2017	Mount Lemmon	Mount Lemmon Survey	·	2.1 km	MPC · JPL
808148	2017 UM_{88}	—	April 28, 2014	Cerro Tololo	DECam	·	1.7 km	MPC · JPL
808149	2017 UP_{90}	—	April 23, 2014	Cerro Tololo	DECam	·	2.4 km	MPC · JPL
808150	2017 UD_{91}	—	October 28, 2017	Haleakala	Pan-STARRS 1	EOS	1.3 km	MPC · JPL
808151	2017 UG_{91}	—	September 14, 2017	Haleakala	Pan-STARRS 1	·	2.0 km	MPC · JPL
808152	2017 UL_{91}	—	October 23, 2017	Mount Lemmon	Mount Lemmon Survey	·	1.8 km	MPC · JPL
808153	2017 UN_{91}	—	August 30, 2016	Haleakala	Pan-STARRS 1	EOS	1.3 km	MPC · JPL
808154	2017 UD_{92}	—	October 21, 2017	Mount Lemmon	Mount Lemmon Survey	·	2.0 km	MPC · JPL
808155	2017 UF_{92}	—	October 28, 2017	Haleakala	Pan-STARRS 1	·	1.3 km	MPC · JPL
808156	2017 UQ_{92}	—	October 28, 2017	Haleakala	Pan-STARRS 1	·	2.1 km	MPC · JPL
808157	2017 UZ_{92}	—	October 23, 2017	Mount Lemmon	Mount Lemmon Survey	·	2.2 km	MPC · JPL
808158	2017 UV_{94}	—	October 22, 2017	Mount Lemmon	Mount Lemmon Survey	·	1.3 km	MPC · JPL
808159	2017 UX_{94}	—	October 23, 2017	Mount Lemmon	Mount Lemmon Survey	·	1.4 km	MPC · JPL
808160	2017 UL_{95}	—	October 22, 2017	Mount Lemmon	Mount Lemmon Survey	·	1.9 km	MPC · JPL
808161	2017 US_{95}	—	October 16, 2017	Mount Lemmon	Mount Lemmon Survey	EMA	2.0 km	MPC · JPL
808162 Andrejsērglis	2017 UX_{95}	Andrejsērglis	October 23, 2017	Baldone	K. Černis, I. Eglītis	·	2.5 km	MPC · JPL
808163	2017 UD_{96}	—	October 17, 2017	Mount Lemmon	Mount Lemmon Survey	·	1.6 km	MPC · JPL
808164	2017 UT_{96}	—	October 30, 2017	Haleakala	Pan-STARRS 1	·	1.6 km	MPC · JPL
808165	2017 UX_{96}	—	October 18, 2017	Mount Lemmon	Mount Lemmon Survey	·	1.8 km	MPC · JPL
808166	2017 UY_{96}	—	October 28, 2017	Haleakala	Pan-STARRS 1	·	1.1 km	MPC · JPL
808167	2017 UA_{97}	—	October 21, 2017	Mount Lemmon	Mount Lemmon Survey	·	1.3 km	MPC · JPL
808168	2017 UH_{97}	—	October 28, 2017	Haleakala	Pan-STARRS 1	·	1.2 km	MPC · JPL
808169	2017 UK_{97}	—	May 20, 2015	Cerro Tololo	DECam	·	1.9 km	MPC · JPL
808170	2017 UX_{97}	—	October 28, 2017	Haleakala	Pan-STARRS 1	·	1.3 km	MPC · JPL
808171	2017 UZ_{97}	—	October 19, 2017	Mount Lemmon	Mount Lemmon Survey	·	2.2 km	MPC · JPL
808172	2017 UH_{98}	—	October 19, 2017	Haleakala	Pan-STARRS 1	·	1.3 km	MPC · JPL
808173	2017 UZ_{99}	—	May 23, 2014	Haleakala	Pan-STARRS 1	·	2.0 km	MPC · JPL
808174	2017 UC_{100}	—	October 27, 2017	Haleakala	Pan-STARRS 1	·	2.0 km	MPC · JPL
808175	2017 UF_{100}	—	September 26, 2017	Haleakala	Pan-STARRS 1	·	1.4 km	MPC · JPL
808176	2017 UL_{100}	—	October 16, 2017	Mount Lemmon	Mount Lemmon Survey	·	1.4 km	MPC · JPL
808177	2017 UF_{101}	—	April 19, 2015	Cerro Tololo	DECam	·	1.4 km	MPC · JPL
808178	2017 UX_{101}	—	October 20, 2017	Mount Lemmon	Mount Lemmon Survey	PHO	770 m	MPC · JPL
808179	2017 UB_{102}	—	October 27, 2017	Mount Lemmon	Mount Lemmon Survey	NEM	1.6 km	MPC · JPL
808180	2017 UD_{103}	—	October 28, 2017	Haleakala	Pan-STARRS 1	·	1.8 km	MPC · JPL
808181	2017 UG_{103}	—	April 15, 2015	Kitt Peak	Research and Education Collaborative Occultation Network	·	1.8 km	MPC · JPL
808182	2017 UH_{103}	—	October 24, 2017	Mount Lemmon	Mount Lemmon Survey	·	2.0 km	MPC · JPL
808183	2017 US_{103}	—	May 20, 2015	Cerro Tololo	DECam	VER	1.8 km	MPC · JPL
808184	2017 UU_{103}	—	October 18, 2017	Mount Lemmon	Mount Lemmon Survey	·	1.8 km	MPC · JPL
808185	2017 UZ_{103}	—	October 27, 2017	Haleakala	Pan-STARRS 1	EOS	1.2 km	MPC · JPL
808186	2017 UC_{104}	—	October 28, 2017	Haleakala	Pan-STARRS 1	·	2.1 km	MPC · JPL
808187	2017 UT_{104}	—	October 27, 2017	Haleakala	Pan-STARRS 1	EOS	1.1 km	MPC · JPL
808188	2017 UF_{105}	—	October 30, 2017	Haleakala	Pan-STARRS 1	·	820 m	MPC · JPL
808189	2017 UK_{105}	—	September 21, 2011	Mount Lemmon	Mount Lemmon Survey	·	1.5 km	MPC · JPL
808190	2017 UM_{105}	—	October 29, 2017	Haleakala	Pan-STARRS 1	·	2.1 km	MPC · JPL
808191	2017 UJ_{106}	—	September 22, 2017	Haleakala	Pan-STARRS 1	·	1.5 km	MPC · JPL
808192	2017 UL_{106}	—	September 26, 2017	Haleakala	Pan-STARRS 1	·	1.4 km	MPC · JPL
808193	2017 UQ_{106}	—	October 27, 2017	Haleakala	Pan-STARRS 1	EOS	1.2 km	MPC · JPL
808194	2017 UT_{106}	—	October 27, 2017	Haleakala	Pan-STARRS 1	EOS	1.3 km	MPC · JPL
808195	2017 UB_{107}	—	October 27, 2017	Haleakala	Pan-STARRS 1	·	1.4 km	MPC · JPL
808196	2017 UE_{107}	—	May 20, 2015	Cerro Tololo	DECam	EOS	1.3 km	MPC · JPL
808197	2017 UF_{107}	—	October 30, 2017	Haleakala	Pan-STARRS 1	·	2.2 km	MPC · JPL
808198	2017 UP_{107}	—	April 23, 2014	Cerro Tololo	DECam	·	2.6 km	MPC · JPL
808199	2017 UQ_{107}	—	October 20, 2017	Mount Lemmon	Mount Lemmon Survey	·	2.3 km	MPC · JPL
808200	2017 UR_{107}	—	October 28, 2017	Haleakala	Pan-STARRS 1	EOS	1.2 km	MPC · JPL

== 808201–808300 ==
back to top

Designation			Discovery			Properties		Ref
Permanent	Provisional	Named after	Date	Site	Discoverer(s)	Category	Diam.	Ref
808201	2017 UJ_{109}	—	October 27, 2017	Mount Lemmon	Mount Lemmon Survey	EOS	1.4 km	MPC · JPL
808202	2017 UY_{109}	—	October 28, 2017	Mount Lemmon	Mount Lemmon Survey	·	1.7 km	MPC · JPL
808203	2017 UB_{110}	—	April 18, 2015	Cerro Tololo	DECam	EOS	1.4 km	MPC · JPL
808204	2017 UP_{110}	—	September 26, 2017	Haleakala	Pan-STARRS 1	·	1.4 km	MPC · JPL
808205	2017 UU_{111}	—	October 28, 2017	Haleakala	Pan-STARRS 1	·	1.1 km	MPC · JPL
808206	2017 UZ_{113}	—	October 27, 2017	Haleakala	Pan-STARRS 1	MAR	730 m	MPC · JPL
808207	2017 UC_{114}	—	October 19, 2017	Haleakala	Pan-STARRS 1	·	1.4 km	MPC · JPL
808208	2017 UP_{114}	—	October 28, 2017	Haleakala	Pan-STARRS 1	·	1.7 km	MPC · JPL
808209	2017 UW_{114}	—	October 21, 2017	Mount Lemmon	Mount Lemmon Survey	EOS	1.3 km	MPC · JPL
808210	2017 UA_{118}	—	October 28, 2017	Haleakala	Pan-STARRS 1	EOS	1.2 km	MPC · JPL
808211	2017 UJ_{118}	—	October 23, 2017	Mount Lemmon	Mount Lemmon Survey	·	1.7 km	MPC · JPL
808212	2017 UL_{118}	—	October 28, 2017	Mount Lemmon	Mount Lemmon Survey	·	1.2 km	MPC · JPL
808213	2017 UY_{118}	—	October 18, 2017	Mount Lemmon	Mount Lemmon Survey	·	1.9 km	MPC · JPL
808214	2017 UV_{119}	—	April 25, 2015	Haleakala	Pan-STARRS 1	·	1.3 km	MPC · JPL
808215	2017 UE_{122}	—	October 30, 2017	Haleakala	Pan-STARRS 1	·	2.2 km	MPC · JPL
808216	2017 UN_{122}	—	October 30, 2017	Haleakala	Pan-STARRS 1	·	2.2 km	MPC · JPL
808217	2017 UT_{122}	—	October 27, 2017	Mount Lemmon	Mount Lemmon Survey	·	1.7 km	MPC · JPL
808218	2017 UV_{123}	—	April 18, 2015	Cerro Tololo	DECam	KOR	880 m	MPC · JPL
808219	2017 UX_{125}	—	October 17, 2017	Kitt Peak	Spacewatch	·	1.2 km	MPC · JPL
808220	2017 UH_{127}	—	May 21, 2015	Cerro Tololo	DECam	·	1.2 km	MPC · JPL
808221	2017 UX_{132}	—	October 21, 2017	Mount Lemmon	Mount Lemmon Survey	·	1.3 km	MPC · JPL
808222	2017 UZ_{135}	—	April 9, 2015	Mount Lemmon	Mount Lemmon Survey	·	1.3 km	MPC · JPL
808223	2017 UE_{137}	—	October 22, 2017	Haleakala	Pan-STARRS 1	·	1.5 km	MPC · JPL
808224	2017 UB_{138}	—	October 22, 2017	Mount Lemmon	Mount Lemmon Survey	·	1.4 km	MPC · JPL
808225	2017 UE_{138}	—	October 30, 2017	Haleakala	Pan-STARRS 1	VER	1.9 km	MPC · JPL
808226	2017 UD_{139}	—	October 22, 2017	Mount Lemmon	Mount Lemmon Survey	·	1.6 km	MPC · JPL
808227	2017 UT_{140}	—	October 18, 2017	Haleakala	Pan-STARRS 1	·	1.2 km	MPC · JPL
808228	2017 UE_{141}	—	October 31, 2017	Mount Lemmon	Mount Lemmon Survey	(895)	2.3 km	MPC · JPL
808229	2017 UN_{141}	—	October 28, 2017	Haleakala	Pan-STARRS 1	EOS	1.2 km	MPC · JPL
808230	2017 UZ_{141}	—	October 28, 2017	Haleakala	Pan-STARRS 1	·	1.2 km	MPC · JPL
808231	2017 UD_{142}	—	October 28, 2017	Haleakala	Pan-STARRS 1	KOR	900 m	MPC · JPL
808232	2017 UW_{142}	—	June 11, 2015	Haleakala	Pan-STARRS 1	·	1.3 km	MPC · JPL
808233	2017 UL_{143}	—	October 28, 2017	Haleakala	Pan-STARRS 1	KOR	1.1 km	MPC · JPL
808234	2017 UN_{143}	—	May 20, 2015	Cerro Tololo	DECam	·	1.4 km	MPC · JPL
808235	2017 UO_{144}	—	October 22, 2017	Mount Lemmon	Mount Lemmon Survey	·	1.3 km	MPC · JPL
808236	2017 UX_{144}	—	October 28, 2017	Haleakala	Pan-STARRS 1	·	1.2 km	MPC · JPL
808237	2017 UH_{145}	—	October 28, 2017	Haleakala	Pan-STARRS 1	HOF	1.8 km	MPC · JPL
808238	2017 UR_{150}	—	April 18, 2015	Cerro Tololo	DECam	·	1.2 km	MPC · JPL
808239	2017 UH_{152}	—	October 8, 2012	Catalina	CSS	·	1.7 km	MPC · JPL
808240	2017 UT_{152}	—	October 30, 2017	Haleakala	Pan-STARRS 1	·	1.3 km	MPC · JPL
808241	2017 UM_{156}	—	October 22, 2017	Mount Lemmon	Mount Lemmon Survey	·	990 m	MPC · JPL
808242	2017 UJ_{170}	—	October 28, 2017	Haleakala	Pan-STARRS 1	·	2.0 km	MPC · JPL
808243	2017 UL_{173}	—	May 19, 2015	Cerro Tololo	DECam	·	1.1 km	MPC · JPL
808244	2017 UC_{179}	—	October 28, 2017	Haleakala	Pan-STARRS 1	·	1.6 km	MPC · JPL
808245	2017 UF_{179}	—	October 27, 2017	Haleakala	Pan-STARRS 1	EOS	1.3 km	MPC · JPL
808246	2017 UT_{179}	—	April 19, 2015	Cerro Tololo	DECam	AGN	790 m	MPC · JPL
808247	2017 UC_{181}	—	December 7, 2013	Kitt Peak	Spacewatch	JUN	670 m	MPC · JPL
808248	2017 UY_{182}	—	June 8, 2016	Haleakala	Pan-STARRS 1	·	1.6 km	MPC · JPL
808249	2017 UD_{185}	—	January 12, 2008	Kitt Peak	Spacewatch	·	2.0 km	MPC · JPL
808250	2017 UO_{185}	—	October 20, 2017	Mount Lemmon	Mount Lemmon Survey	·	2.3 km	MPC · JPL
808251	2017 UV_{189}	—	October 22, 2017	Haleakala	Pan-STARRS 1	T_{j} (2.95)	2.3 km	MPC · JPL
808252	2017 UM_{190}	—	October 17, 2017	Mount Lemmon	Mount Lemmon Survey	·	2.2 km	MPC · JPL
808253	2017 UG_{191}	—	October 19, 2017	Mount Lemmon	Mount Lemmon Survey	·	2.3 km	MPC · JPL
808254	2017 UT_{191}	—	October 27, 2017	Mount Lemmon	Mount Lemmon Survey	VER	2.0 km	MPC · JPL
808255	2017 UP_{193}	—	October 22, 2017	Mount Lemmon	Mount Lemmon Survey	·	1.9 km	MPC · JPL
808256	2017 UL_{194}	—	October 28, 2017	Mount Lemmon	Mount Lemmon Survey	·	1.7 km	MPC · JPL
808257	2017 UE_{196}	—	October 27, 2017	Haleakala	Pan-STARRS 1	VER	1.9 km	MPC · JPL
808258	2017 UF_{197}	—	October 29, 2017	Haleakala	Pan-STARRS 1	·	2.0 km	MPC · JPL
808259	2017 UP_{197}	—	October 29, 2017	Haleakala	Pan-STARRS 1	·	2.2 km	MPC · JPL
808260	2017 UX_{197}	—	May 15, 2015	Haleakala	Pan-STARRS 1	·	1.9 km	MPC · JPL
808261	2017 UG_{199}	—	October 27, 2017	Mount Lemmon	Mount Lemmon Survey	EOS	1.2 km	MPC · JPL
808262	2017 UO_{200}	—	October 28, 2017	Mount Lemmon	Mount Lemmon Survey	·	1.9 km	MPC · JPL
808263	2017 UC_{201}	—	October 30, 2017	Haleakala	Pan-STARRS 1	·	1.8 km	MPC · JPL
808264	2017 UU_{201}	—	October 8, 2012	Mount Lemmon	Mount Lemmon Survey	KOR	940 m	MPC · JPL
808265	2017 UC_{202}	—	October 28, 2017	Haleakala	Pan-STARRS 1	·	1.4 km	MPC · JPL
808266	2017 UU_{202}	—	August 19, 2006	Kitt Peak	Spacewatch	EOS	1.0 km	MPC · JPL
808267	2017 UN_{213}	—	October 27, 2017	Haleakala	Pan-STARRS 1	·	1.3 km	MPC · JPL
808268	2017 UQ_{214}	—	October 27, 2017	Haleakala	Pan-STARRS 1	·	1.7 km	MPC · JPL
808269	2017 UY_{214}	—	October 27, 2017	Haleakala	Pan-STARRS 1	·	2.1 km	MPC · JPL
808270	2017 UX_{217}	—	October 23, 2017	Mount Lemmon	Mount Lemmon Survey	·	1.5 km	MPC · JPL
808271	2017 UF_{229}	—	October 28, 2017	Haleakala	Pan-STARRS 1	·	2.8 km	MPC · JPL
808272	2017 VQ	—	November 7, 2017	Haleakala	Pan-STARRS 1	·	560 m	MPC · JPL
808273	2017 VG_{7}	—	October 28, 2008	Kitt Peak	Spacewatch	·	1.3 km	MPC · JPL
808274	2017 VM_{17}	—	October 27, 2017	Haleakala	Pan-STARRS 1	·	1.4 km	MPC · JPL
808275	2017 VR_{17}	—	June 3, 2000	Mauna Kea	Stetson, P. B., Fahlman, G.	·	1.9 km	MPC · JPL
808276	2017 VT_{19}	—	May 20, 2015	Cerro Tololo	DECam	EOS	1.3 km	MPC · JPL
808277	2017 VU_{28}	—	October 17, 2017	Kitt Peak	Spacewatch	·	2.1 km	MPC · JPL
808278	2017 VK_{30}	—	November 13, 2017	Haleakala	Pan-STARRS 1	VER	1.8 km	MPC · JPL
808279	2017 VD_{31}	—	May 19, 2012	Mount Lemmon	Mount Lemmon Survey	·	1.2 km	MPC · JPL
808280	2017 VQ_{36}	—	November 15, 2017	Mount Lemmon	Mount Lemmon Survey	·	2.0 km	MPC · JPL
808281	2017 VF_{39}	—	November 13, 2017	Haleakala	Pan-STARRS 1	·	1.3 km	MPC · JPL
808282	2017 VU_{39}	—	November 14, 2017	Mount Lemmon	Mount Lemmon Survey	·	2.0 km	MPC · JPL
808283	2017 VK_{41}	—	November 13, 2017	Haleakala	Pan-STARRS 1	·	2.3 km	MPC · JPL
808284	2017 VW_{42}	—	November 15, 2017	Mount Lemmon	Mount Lemmon Survey	EOS	1.3 km	MPC · JPL
808285	2017 VG_{43}	—	November 7, 2017	Haleakala	Pan-STARRS 1	EOS	1.2 km	MPC · JPL
808286	2017 VV_{44}	—	May 20, 2015	Cerro Tololo	DECam	·	1.7 km	MPC · JPL
808287	2017 VC_{46}	—	November 12, 2017	Kitt Peak	Spacewatch	·	1.5 km	MPC · JPL
808288	2017 VL_{46}	—	April 18, 2015	Cerro Tololo	DECam	PHO	640 m	MPC · JPL
808289	2017 VH_{51}	—	November 7, 2017	Haleakala	Pan-STARRS 1	·	2.0 km	MPC · JPL
808290	2017 VU_{51}	—	April 24, 2014	Cerro Tololo	DECam	·	1.7 km	MPC · JPL
808291	2017 VV_{51}	—	November 13, 2017	Haleakala	Pan-STARRS 1	·	1.8 km	MPC · JPL
808292	2017 VW_{51}	—	November 13, 2017	Haleakala	Pan-STARRS 1	·	1.9 km	MPC · JPL
808293	2017 VE_{52}	—	April 21, 2015	Cerro Tololo	DECam	·	1.2 km	MPC · JPL
808294	2017 VD_{54}	—	April 10, 2015	Mount Lemmon	Mount Lemmon Survey	AGN	850 m	MPC · JPL
808295	2017 VL_{54}	—	November 15, 2017	Mount Lemmon	Mount Lemmon Survey	·	1.2 km	MPC · JPL
808296	2017 VR_{58}	—	November 13, 2017	Haleakala	Pan-STARRS 1	·	1.2 km	MPC · JPL
808297	2017 VC_{62}	—	November 13, 2017	Haleakala	Pan-STARRS 1	·	1.5 km	MPC · JPL
808298	2017 VM_{63}	—	November 15, 2017	Mount Lemmon	Mount Lemmon Survey	KOR	980 m	MPC · JPL
808299	2017 VQ_{63}	—	October 28, 2017	Haleakala	Pan-STARRS 1	·	1.6 km	MPC · JPL
808300	2017 VR_{64}	—	November 15, 2017	Mount Lemmon	Mount Lemmon Survey	·	1.7 km	MPC · JPL

== 808301–808400 ==
back to top

Designation			Discovery			Properties		Ref
Permanent	Provisional	Named after	Date	Site	Discoverer(s)	Category	Diam.	Ref
808301	2017 VL_{65}	—	November 15, 2017	Mount Lemmon	Mount Lemmon Survey	·	1.6 km	MPC · JPL
808302	2017 VE_{66}	—	November 15, 2017	Mount Lemmon	Mount Lemmon Survey	·	1.8 km	MPC · JPL
808303	2017 VF_{66}	—	October 29, 2017	Haleakala	Pan-STARRS 1	T_{j} (2.98)	2.5 km	MPC · JPL
808304	2017 VG_{66}	—	November 10, 2017	Haleakala	Pan-STARRS 1	·	1.6 km	MPC · JPL
808305	2017 VJ_{66}	—	November 15, 2017	Mount Lemmon	Mount Lemmon Survey	·	1.7 km	MPC · JPL
808306	2017 VY_{66}	—	July 5, 2016	Mount Lemmon	Mount Lemmon Survey	·	1.2 km	MPC · JPL
808307	2017 VE_{67}	—	November 13, 2017	Haleakala	Pan-STARRS 1	·	1.1 km	MPC · JPL
808308	2017 VD_{68}	—	November 13, 2017	Haleakala	Pan-STARRS 1	·	1.5 km	MPC · JPL
808309	2017 VL_{69}	—	November 15, 2017	Mount Lemmon	Mount Lemmon Survey	·	2.5 km	MPC · JPL
808310	2017 WG_{4}	—	April 18, 2015	Cerro Tololo	DECam	·	930 m	MPC · JPL
808311	2017 WK_{5}	—	August 7, 2016	Haleakala	Pan-STARRS 1	·	1.9 km	MPC · JPL
808312	2017 WQ_{6}	—	January 30, 2011	Haleakala	Pan-STARRS 1	ERI	1.1 km	MPC · JPL
808313	2017 WV_{6}	—	July 5, 2016	Haleakala	Pan-STARRS 1	EOS	1.3 km	MPC · JPL
808314	2017 WR_{8}	—	May 18, 2015	Mount Lemmon	Mount Lemmon Survey	EOS	1.5 km	MPC · JPL
808315	2017 WF_{9}	—	June 5, 2016	Haleakala	Pan-STARRS 1	·	2.2 km	MPC · JPL
808316	2017 WE_{17}	—	March 17, 2015	Mount Lemmon	Mount Lemmon Survey	·	750 m	MPC · JPL
808317	2017 WD_{19}	—	November 24, 2012	Kitt Peak	Spacewatch	·	1.6 km	MPC · JPL
808318	2017 WE_{19}	—	September 24, 2017	Haleakala	Pan-STARRS 1	·	2.3 km	MPC · JPL
808319	2017 WO_{22}	—	October 30, 2017	Haleakala	Pan-STARRS 1	·	480 m	MPC · JPL
808320	2017 WJ_{24}	—	September 28, 2006	Mount Lemmon	Mount Lemmon Survey	·	2.9 km	MPC · JPL
808321	2017 WQ_{31}	—	August 1, 2016	Haleakala	Pan-STARRS 1	T_{j} (2.98) · EUP	2.4 km	MPC · JPL
808322	2017 WN_{33}	—	November 16, 2017	Mount Lemmon	Mount Lemmon Survey	·	2.0 km	MPC · JPL
808323	2017 WR_{38}	—	November 25, 2017	Mount Lemmon	Mount Lemmon Survey	·	2.4 km	MPC · JPL
808324	2017 WK_{40}	—	November 21, 2017	Mount Lemmon	Mount Lemmon Survey	·	2.4 km	MPC · JPL
808325	2017 WY_{40}	—	November 22, 2017	Haleakala	Pan-STARRS 1	·	550 m	MPC · JPL
808326	2017 WL_{41}	—	November 17, 2017	Mount Lemmon	Mount Lemmon Survey	·	2.6 km	MPC · JPL
808327	2017 WJ_{45}	—	November 21, 2017	Haleakala	Pan-STARRS 1	·	2.0 km	MPC · JPL
808328	2017 WT_{45}	—	May 21, 2015	Cerro Tololo	DECam	KOR	900 m	MPC · JPL
808329	2017 WV_{45}	—	November 18, 2017	Haleakala	Pan-STARRS 1	·	1.8 km	MPC · JPL
808330	2017 WY_{45}	—	November 26, 2017	Mount Lemmon	Mount Lemmon Survey	·	1.7 km	MPC · JPL
808331	2017 WA_{47}	—	November 16, 2017	Mount Lemmon	Mount Lemmon Survey	·	1.7 km	MPC · JPL
808332	2017 WD_{47}	—	November 21, 2017	Haleakala	Pan-STARRS 1	·	2.1 km	MPC · JPL
808333	2017 WP_{47}	—	May 2, 2014	Mount Lemmon	Mount Lemmon Survey	·	1.9 km	MPC · JPL
808334	2017 WV_{47}	—	April 4, 2014	Mount Lemmon	Mount Lemmon Survey	·	1.9 km	MPC · JPL
808335	2017 WZ_{47}	—	November 18, 2017	Haleakala	Pan-STARRS 1	EOS	1.5 km	MPC · JPL
808336	2017 WA_{50}	—	November 17, 2017	Mount Lemmon	Mount Lemmon Survey	·	1.9 km	MPC · JPL
808337	2017 WE_{50}	—	May 21, 2015	Haleakala	Pan-STARRS 1	·	1.2 km	MPC · JPL
808338	2017 WS_{50}	—	November 27, 2017	Mount Lemmon	Mount Lemmon Survey	·	1.8 km	MPC · JPL
808339	2017 WD_{51}	—	April 25, 2015	Haleakala	Pan-STARRS 1	KOR	980 m	MPC · JPL
808340	2017 WN_{51}	—	May 1, 2016	Cerro Tololo	DECam	·	430 m	MPC · JPL
808341	2017 WT_{52}	—	November 21, 2017	Haleakala	Pan-STARRS 1	·	2.1 km	MPC · JPL
808342	2017 WU_{53}	—	November 18, 2017	Haleakala	Pan-STARRS 1	·	690 m	MPC · JPL
808343	2017 WX_{53}	—	November 18, 2017	Haleakala	Pan-STARRS 1	EOS	1.3 km	MPC · JPL
808344	2017 WA_{54}	—	November 21, 2017	Haleakala	Pan-STARRS 1	·	2.3 km	MPC · JPL
808345	2017 WC_{54}	—	November 16, 2017	Mount Lemmon	Mount Lemmon Survey	·	1.6 km	MPC · JPL
808346	2017 WO_{54}	—	November 17, 2017	Haleakala	Pan-STARRS 1	·	1.9 km	MPC · JPL
808347	2017 WF_{55}	—	November 21, 2017	Haleakala	Pan-STARRS 1	·	1.3 km	MPC · JPL
808348	2017 WO_{58}	—	November 21, 2017	Haleakala	Pan-STARRS 1	EOS	1.5 km	MPC · JPL
808349	2017 WS_{59}	—	November 24, 2017	Mount Lemmon	Mount Lemmon Survey	·	1.8 km	MPC · JPL
808350	2017 WH_{63}	—	November 21, 2017	Haleakala	Pan-STARRS 1	·	1.2 km	MPC · JPL
808351	2017 WP_{63}	—	November 21, 2017	Haleakala	Pan-STARRS 1	EOS	1.2 km	MPC · JPL
808352	2017 WS_{63}	—	November 21, 2017	Mount Lemmon	Mount Lemmon Survey	·	2.2 km	MPC · JPL
808353	2017 WZ_{63}	—	November 25, 2017	Mount Lemmon	Mount Lemmon Survey	·	2.1 km	MPC · JPL
808354	2017 WM_{68}	—	April 21, 2015	Cerro Tololo	DECam	·	1.2 km	MPC · JPL
808355	2017 WN_{72}	—	April 18, 2015	Cerro Tololo	DECam	·	980 m	MPC · JPL
808356	2017 WZ_{76}	—	April 28, 2014	Cerro Tololo	DECam	·	2.2 km	MPC · JPL
808357	2017 WX_{77}	—	November 24, 2017	Mount Lemmon	Mount Lemmon Survey	·	1.8 km	MPC · JPL
808358	2017 WY_{83}	—	April 23, 2015	Haleakala	Pan-STARRS 1	·	1.4 km	MPC · JPL
808359	2017 WK_{84}	—	January 3, 2014	Kitt Peak	Spacewatch	·	1.2 km	MPC · JPL
808360	2017 WK_{86}	—	November 21, 2017	Haleakala	Pan-STARRS 1	·	1 km	MPC · JPL
808361	2017 WE_{87}	—	November 19, 2017	Haleakala	Pan-STARRS 1	·	2.4 km	MPC · JPL
808362	2017 WL_{87}	—	September 12, 2016	Mount Lemmon	Mount Lemmon Survey	VER	2.1 km	MPC · JPL
808363	2017 WF_{90}	—	November 17, 2017	Haleakala	Pan-STARRS 1	TIR	1.8 km	MPC · JPL
808364	2017 WR_{90}	—	November 21, 2017	Haleakala	Pan-STARRS 1	·	1.8 km	MPC · JPL
808365	2017 WD_{91}	—	November 21, 2017	Mount Lemmon	Mount Lemmon Survey	TIR	1.8 km	MPC · JPL
808366	2017 WL_{93}	—	August 29, 2016	Mount Lemmon	Mount Lemmon Survey	·	1.9 km	MPC · JPL
808367	2017 WV_{93}	—	November 18, 2017	Haleakala	Pan-STARRS 1	·	1.8 km	MPC · JPL
808368	2017 WV_{95}	—	November 24, 2017	Haleakala	Pan-STARRS 1	·	1.6 km	MPC · JPL
808369	2017 WD_{96}	—	November 21, 2017	Haleakala	Pan-STARRS 1	·	2.0 km	MPC · JPL
808370	2017 WR_{96}	—	November 19, 2017	Haleakala	Pan-STARRS 1	·	1.8 km	MPC · JPL
808371	2017 WC_{97}	—	November 17, 2017	Haleakala	Pan-STARRS 1	·	1.7 km	MPC · JPL
808372	2017 WH_{99}	—	April 21, 2014	Mount Lemmon	Mount Lemmon Survey	·	2.4 km	MPC · JPL
808373	2017 WC_{102}	—	November 17, 2017	Haleakala	Pan-STARRS 1	·	1.2 km	MPC · JPL
808374	2017 WK_{102}	—	February 21, 2009	Kitt Peak	Spacewatch	·	1.4 km	MPC · JPL
808375	2017 WW_{102}	—	November 21, 2017	Haleakala	Pan-STARRS 1	·	2.2 km	MPC · JPL
808376	2017 WD_{103}	—	November 16, 2017	Mount Lemmon	Mount Lemmon Survey	HYG	1.9 km	MPC · JPL
808377	2017 WE_{103}	—	November 27, 2017	Mount Lemmon	Mount Lemmon Survey	·	2.4 km	MPC · JPL
808378	2017 WG_{103}	—	November 22, 2017	Haleakala	Pan-STARRS 1	·	1.8 km	MPC · JPL
808379	2017 XL_{11}	—	August 9, 2016	Haleakala	Pan-STARRS 1	EOS	1.3 km	MPC · JPL
808380	2017 XS_{15}	—	August 10, 2016	Haleakala	Pan-STARRS 1	·	1.6 km	MPC · JPL
808381	2017 XF_{25}	—	October 30, 2017	Haleakala	Pan-STARRS 1	·	880 m	MPC · JPL
808382	2017 XW_{26}	—	November 17, 2017	Haleakala	Pan-STARRS 1	·	2.0 km	MPC · JPL
808383	2017 XD_{32}	—	October 18, 2017	Mount Lemmon	Mount Lemmon Survey	T_{j} (2.99)	2.3 km	MPC · JPL
808384	2017 XQ_{32}	—	November 13, 2006	Kitt Peak	Spacewatch	·	2.0 km	MPC · JPL
808385	2017 XR_{32}	—	April 4, 2014	Haleakala	Pan-STARRS 1	·	1.8 km	MPC · JPL
808386	2017 XZ_{32}	—	August 9, 2016	Haleakala	Pan-STARRS 1	EOS	1.3 km	MPC · JPL
808387	2017 XM_{33}	—	October 30, 2017	Haleakala	Pan-STARRS 1	·	1.7 km	MPC · JPL
808388	2017 XK_{40}	—	November 27, 2006	Kitt Peak	Spacewatch	·	2.0 km	MPC · JPL
808389	2017 XH_{42}	—	February 24, 2014	Haleakala	Pan-STARRS 1	TEL	850 m	MPC · JPL
808390	2017 XQ_{44}	—	April 9, 2015	Mount Lemmon	Mount Lemmon Survey	·	990 m	MPC · JPL
808391	2017 XA_{46}	—	April 18, 2015	Cerro Tololo	DECam	·	1.5 km	MPC · JPL
808392	2017 XP_{46}	—	November 18, 2017	Haleakala	Pan-STARRS 1	·	1.8 km	MPC · JPL
808393	2017 XB_{63}	—	October 17, 2011	Kitt Peak	Spacewatch	·	3.0 km	MPC · JPL
808394	2017 XD_{70}	—	December 14, 2017	Mount Lemmon	Mount Lemmon Survey	·	2.4 km	MPC · JPL
808395	2017 XP_{70}	—	December 13, 2017	Haleakala	Pan-STARRS 1	·	2.1 km	MPC · JPL
808396	2017 XZ_{70}	—	December 13, 2017	Haleakala	Pan-STARRS 1	·	1.5 km	MPC · JPL
808397	2017 XC_{71}	—	December 9, 2017	Haleakala	Pan-STARRS 1	·	2.1 km	MPC · JPL
808398	2017 XF_{71}	—	December 15, 2017	Mount Lemmon	Mount Lemmon Survey	(5)	1.1 km	MPC · JPL
808399	2017 XO_{71}	—	December 10, 2017	Haleakala	Pan-STARRS 1	·	1.6 km	MPC · JPL
808400	2017 XH_{72}	—	December 14, 2017	Kitt Peak	Spacewatch	EUP	2.5 km	MPC · JPL

== 808401–808500 ==
back to top

Designation			Discovery			Properties		Ref
Permanent	Provisional	Named after	Date	Site	Discoverer(s)	Category	Diam.	Ref
808401	2017 XP_{74}	—	December 12, 2017	Haleakala	Pan-STARRS 1	AGN	880 m	MPC · JPL
808402	2017 XK_{77}	—	December 14, 2017	Mount Lemmon	Mount Lemmon Survey	·	1.9 km	MPC · JPL
808403	2017 XX_{77}	—	December 15, 2017	Mount Lemmon	Mount Lemmon Survey	EUP	2.7 km	MPC · JPL
808404	2017 XT_{78}	—	April 4, 2014	Mount Lemmon	Mount Lemmon Survey	·	1.8 km	MPC · JPL
808405	2017 XJ_{81}	—	December 12, 2017	Haleakala	Pan-STARRS 1	·	1.3 km	MPC · JPL
808406	2017 XS_{81}	—	December 12, 2017	Haleakala	Pan-STARRS 1	·	2.1 km	MPC · JPL
808407	2017 XK_{83}	—	December 15, 2017	Mount Lemmon	Mount Lemmon Survey	·	2.3 km	MPC · JPL
808408	2017 XD_{85}	—	December 9, 2017	Haleakala	Pan-STARRS 1	EOS	1.2 km	MPC · JPL
808409	2017 XF_{85}	—	December 13, 2017	Mount Lemmon	Mount Lemmon Survey	EUN	910 m	MPC · JPL
808410	2017 XU_{85}	—	December 14, 2017	Mount Lemmon	Mount Lemmon Survey	·	960 m	MPC · JPL
808411	2017 XL_{91}	—	October 23, 2011	Mount Lemmon	Mount Lemmon Survey	·	1.9 km	MPC · JPL
808412	2017 XN_{94}	—	December 14, 2017	Mount Lemmon	Mount Lemmon Survey	·	2.2 km	MPC · JPL
808413	2017 XG_{96}	—	December 15, 2017	Mount Lemmon	Mount Lemmon Survey	·	2.3 km	MPC · JPL
808414	2017 XF_{97}	—	December 13, 2017	Haleakala	Pan-STARRS 1	EUN	780 m	MPC · JPL
808415	2017 YE_{10}	—	May 4, 2014	Haleakala	Pan-STARRS 1	·	2.3 km	MPC · JPL
808416	2017 YB_{11}	—	May 30, 2016	Haleakala	Pan-STARRS 1	·	1.6 km	MPC · JPL
808417	2017 YS_{12}	—	September 15, 2013	Haleakala	Pan-STARRS 1	·	700 m	MPC · JPL
808418	2017 YC_{16}	—	December 26, 2017	Mount Lemmon	Mount Lemmon Survey	LUT	3.1 km	MPC · JPL
808419	2017 YN_{23}	—	December 24, 2017	Haleakala	Pan-STARRS 1	·	2.2 km	MPC · JPL
808420	2017 YW_{26}	—	December 23, 2017	Haleakala	Pan-STARRS 1	·	1.2 km	MPC · JPL
808421	2017 YC_{27}	—	May 18, 2015	Haleakala	Pan-STARRS 1	·	600 m	MPC · JPL
808422	2017 YE_{27}	—	December 23, 2017	Haleakala	Pan-STARRS 1	·	1.3 km	MPC · JPL
808423	2017 YQ_{27}	—	December 26, 2017	Mount Lemmon	Mount Lemmon Survey	·	2.0 km	MPC · JPL
808424	2017 YW_{27}	—	December 23, 2017	Haleakala	Pan-STARRS 1	·	2.2 km	MPC · JPL
808425	2017 YD_{29}	—	September 24, 2011	Haleakala	Pan-STARRS 1	·	1.4 km	MPC · JPL
808426	2017 YN_{29}	—	May 12, 2015	Mount Lemmon	Mount Lemmon Survey	·	890 m	MPC · JPL
808427	2017 YR_{29}	—	December 23, 2017	Haleakala	Pan-STARRS 1	·	1.1 km	MPC · JPL
808428	2017 YX_{29}	—	December 25, 2017	Haleakala	Pan-STARRS 1	·	2.3 km	MPC · JPL
808429	2017 YQ_{30}	—	December 24, 2017	Haleakala	Pan-STARRS 1	·	1.7 km	MPC · JPL
808430	2017 YS_{30}	—	December 26, 2017	Haleakala	Pan-STARRS 1	·	2.2 km	MPC · JPL
808431	2017 YY_{31}	—	December 26, 2017	Mount Lemmon	Mount Lemmon Survey	·	1.4 km	MPC · JPL
808432	2017 YW_{33}	—	December 23, 2017	Haleakala	Pan-STARRS 1	·	1.3 km	MPC · JPL
808433	2017 YV_{38}	—	December 24, 2017	Haleakala	Pan-STARRS 1	VER	1.8 km	MPC · JPL
808434	2017 YN_{39}	—	December 22, 2017	Haleakala	Pan-STARRS 1	·	700 m	MPC · JPL
808435	2017 YW_{39}	—	December 24, 2017	Haleakala	Pan-STARRS 1	·	2.3 km	MPC · JPL
808436	2017 YF_{42}	—	November 15, 2011	Mount Lemmon	Mount Lemmon Survey	·	1.3 km	MPC · JPL
808437	2017 YS_{43}	—	December 23, 2017	Haleakala	Pan-STARRS 1	·	1.3 km	MPC · JPL
808438	2017 YT_{43}	—	December 16, 2017	Mount Lemmon	Mount Lemmon Survey	·	1.4 km	MPC · JPL
808439	2017 YE_{45}	—	December 26, 2017	Mount Lemmon	Mount Lemmon Survey	·	2.6 km	MPC · JPL
808440	2017 YK_{45}	—	December 20, 2017	Kitt Peak	Spacewatch	·	1.5 km	MPC · JPL
808441	2017 YT_{46}	—	April 24, 2014	Cerro Tololo	DECam	·	1.2 km	MPC · JPL
808442	2017 YU_{48}	—	December 24, 2017	Haleakala	Pan-STARRS 1	MRX	540 m	MPC · JPL
808443	2017 YY_{50}	—	June 18, 2015	Haleakala	Pan-STARRS 1	·	1.0 km	MPC · JPL
808444	2017 YT_{52}	—	December 23, 2017	Haleakala	Pan-STARRS 1	·	1.3 km	MPC · JPL
808445	2017 YR_{56}	—	December 26, 2017	Haleakala	Pan-STARRS 1	·	630 m	MPC · JPL
808446	2017 YW_{58}	—	December 23, 2017	Haleakala	Pan-STARRS 1	·	2.2 km	MPC · JPL
808447	2017 YY_{62}	—	August 26, 2016	Haleakala	Pan-STARRS 1	EUP	2.3 km	MPC · JPL
808448	2017 YD_{64}	—	December 23, 2017	Haleakala	Pan-STARRS 1	·	1.8 km	MPC · JPL
808449	2017 YE_{64}	—	December 16, 2017	Mount Lemmon	Mount Lemmon Survey	·	2.0 km	MPC · JPL
808450	2017 YP_{64}	—	December 23, 2017	Haleakala	Pan-STARRS 1	·	2.1 km	MPC · JPL
808451	2017 YD_{65}	—	November 12, 2005	Kitt Peak	Spacewatch	ELF	2.2 km	MPC · JPL
808452	2017 YD_{68}	—	December 23, 2017	Haleakala	Pan-STARRS 1	·	2.0 km	MPC · JPL
808453	2017 YP_{68}	—	December 26, 2017	Mount Lemmon	Mount Lemmon Survey	·	990 m	MPC · JPL
808454	2017 YD_{71}	—	December 21, 2005	Kitt Peak	Spacewatch	·	1.9 km	MPC · JPL
808455	2017 YM_{71}	—	August 29, 2005	Kitt Peak	Spacewatch	·	1.3 km	MPC · JPL
808456	2017 YW_{73}	—	December 24, 2017	Haleakala	Pan-STARRS 1	·	1.8 km	MPC · JPL
808457	2018 AY_{5}	—	January 4, 2014	Haleakala	Pan-STARRS 1	KON	1.5 km	MPC · JPL
808458	2018 AE_{6}	—	October 9, 2010	Mount Lemmon	Mount Lemmon Survey	·	2.1 km	MPC · JPL
808459	2018 AC_{8}	—	February 21, 2007	Mount Lemmon	Mount Lemmon Survey	·	2.3 km	MPC · JPL
808460	2018 AO_{8}	—	December 24, 2017	Haleakala	Pan-STARRS 1	·	1.2 km	MPC · JPL
808461	2018 AC_{15}	—	October 22, 2016	Mount Lemmon	Mount Lemmon Survey	·	1.7 km	MPC · JPL
808462	2018 AR_{15}	—	November 17, 2011	Catalina	CSS	·	3.1 km	MPC · JPL
808463	2018 AW_{15}	—	February 15, 2013	ESA OGS	ESA OGS	·	1.9 km	MPC · JPL
808464	2018 AM_{23}	—	January 14, 2018	Haleakala	Pan-STARRS 1	·	2.5 km	MPC · JPL
808465	2018 AH_{27}	—	January 14, 2018	Mount Lemmon	Mount Lemmon Survey	THM	1.7 km	MPC · JPL
808466	2018 AJ_{27}	—	January 11, 2018	Haleakala	Pan-STARRS 1	·	1.1 km	MPC · JPL
808467	2018 AR_{27}	—	January 12, 2018	Haleakala	Pan-STARRS 1	·	800 m	MPC · JPL
808468	2018 AD_{28}	—	February 27, 2006	Mount Lemmon	Mount Lemmon Survey	·	1.1 km	MPC · JPL
808469	2018 AJ_{29}	—	July 24, 2015	Haleakala	Pan-STARRS 1	·	2.3 km	MPC · JPL
808470	2018 AH_{30}	—	January 15, 2018	Haleakala	Pan-STARRS 1	·	1.1 km	MPC · JPL
808471	2018 AK_{31}	—	January 14, 2018	Haleakala	Pan-STARRS 1	MAR	890 m	MPC · JPL
808472	2018 AR_{32}	—	January 15, 2018	Haleakala	Pan-STARRS 1	·	1.1 km	MPC · JPL
808473	2018 AV_{32}	—	January 15, 2018	Haleakala	Pan-STARRS 1	·	820 m	MPC · JPL
808474	2018 AS_{33}	—	February 28, 2014	Haleakala	Pan-STARRS 1	·	860 m	MPC · JPL
808475	2018 AD_{34}	—	January 15, 2018	Haleakala	Pan-STARRS 1	·	2.2 km	MPC · JPL
808476	2018 AQ_{35}	—	April 18, 2015	Cerro Tololo	DECam	(2076)	490 m	MPC · JPL
808477	2018 AL_{39}	—	January 13, 2018	Mount Lemmon	Mount Lemmon Survey	·	2.0 km	MPC · JPL
808478	2018 AS_{39}	—	January 13, 2018	Haleakala	Pan-STARRS 1	·	2.0 km	MPC · JPL
808479	2018 AJ_{42}	—	April 28, 2014	Cerro Tololo	DECam	·	1.3 km	MPC · JPL
808480	2018 AX_{42}	—	January 12, 2018	Mount Lemmon	Mount Lemmon Survey	·	1.1 km	MPC · JPL
808481	2018 AH_{43}	—	January 15, 2018	Haleakala	Pan-STARRS 1	L5	5.3 km	MPC · JPL
808482	2018 AN_{45}	—	January 14, 2018	Haleakala	Pan-STARRS 1	·	3.1 km	MPC · JPL
808483	2018 AX_{45}	—	November 15, 1995	Kitt Peak	Spacewatch	·	1.2 km	MPC · JPL
808484	2018 AA_{49}	—	January 12, 2018	Mount Lemmon	Mount Lemmon Survey	·	1.4 km	MPC · JPL
808485	2018 AE_{51}	—	April 29, 2014	Haleakala	Pan-STARRS 1	EOS	1.2 km	MPC · JPL
808486	2018 AJ_{52}	—	January 14, 2018	Haleakala	Pan-STARRS 1	·	2.0 km	MPC · JPL
808487	2018 AY_{52}	—	January 14, 2018	Haleakala	Pan-STARRS 1	·	1.8 km	MPC · JPL
808488	2018 AR_{53}	—	December 4, 2012	Mount Lemmon	Mount Lemmon Survey	·	1.5 km	MPC · JPL
808489	2018 AP_{55}	—	January 12, 2018	Mount Lemmon	Mount Lemmon Survey	·	2.3 km	MPC · JPL
808490	2018 AW_{57}	—	January 10, 2018	Haleakala	Pan-STARRS 1	VER	1.8 km	MPC · JPL
808491	2018 AQ_{59}	—	May 7, 2014	Haleakala	Pan-STARRS 1	·	2.4 km	MPC · JPL
808492	2018 AR_{59}	—	January 12, 2018	Haleakala	Pan-STARRS 1	·	2.2 km	MPC · JPL
808493	2018 AS_{61}	—	January 15, 2018	Mount Lemmon	Mount Lemmon Survey	·	900 m	MPC · JPL
808494	2018 AV_{63}	—	October 26, 2016	Kitt Peak	Spacewatch	VER	1.7 km	MPC · JPL
808495	2018 AA_{66}	—	January 12, 2018	Mount Lemmon	Mount Lemmon Survey	·	2.2 km	MPC · JPL
808496	2018 AE_{68}	—	January 6, 2018	Haleakala	Pan-STARRS 1	·	2.4 km	MPC · JPL
808497	2018 AF_{69}	—	January 8, 2018	Haleakala	Pan-STARRS 1	·	2.2 km	MPC · JPL
808498	2018 AX_{69}	—	November 5, 2016	Haleakala	Pan-STARRS 1	·	2.3 km	MPC · JPL
808499	2018 AQ_{72}	—	January 14, 2018	Mount Lemmon	Mount Lemmon Survey	(17392)	1.1 km	MPC · JPL
808500	2018 AJ_{75}	—	January 11, 2018	Haleakala	Pan-STARRS 1	·	2.3 km	MPC · JPL

== 808501–808600 ==
back to top

Designation			Discovery			Properties		Ref
Permanent	Provisional	Named after	Date	Site	Discoverer(s)	Category	Diam.	Ref
808501	2018 AM_{77}	—	January 13, 2018	Mount Lemmon	Mount Lemmon Survey	·	2.1 km	MPC · JPL
808502	2018 BH_{2}	—	May 20, 2015	Cerro Tololo	DECam	·	660 m	MPC · JPL
808503	2018 BO_{8}	—	January 8, 2018	Mount Lemmon	Mount Lemmon Survey	·	2.4 km	MPC · JPL
808504	2018 BE_{19}	—	February 28, 2014	Haleakala	Pan-STARRS 1	·	1.2 km	MPC · JPL
808505	2018 BH_{21}	—	January 16, 2018	Haleakala	Pan-STARRS 1	(17392)	1.1 km	MPC · JPL
808506	2018 BP_{27}	—	January 16, 2018	Haleakala	Pan-STARRS 1	·	1.5 km	MPC · JPL
808507	2018 BY_{29}	—	January 16, 2018	Haleakala	Pan-STARRS 1	·	2.0 km	MPC · JPL
808508	2018 BF_{30}	—	January 16, 2018	Haleakala	Pan-STARRS 1	VER	2.0 km	MPC · JPL
808509	2018 BJ_{34}	—	January 20, 2018	Mount Lemmon	Mount Lemmon Survey	·	3.2 km	MPC · JPL
808510	2018 BO_{34}	—	January 20, 2018	Mount Lemmon	Mount Lemmon Survey	·	1.1 km	MPC · JPL
808511	2018 BP_{38}	—	January 17, 2018	Haleakala	Pan-STARRS 1	·	1.2 km	MPC · JPL
808512	2018 BQ_{39}	—	January 16, 2018	Haleakala	Pan-STARRS 1	·	2.3 km	MPC · JPL
808513	2018 BS_{42}	—	January 16, 2018	Haleakala	Pan-STARRS 1	VER	1.9 km	MPC · JPL
808514	2018 BZ_{51}	—	January 23, 2018	Mount Lemmon	Mount Lemmon Survey	·	2.1 km	MPC · JPL
808515	2018 BH_{52}	—	January 16, 2018	Haleakala	Pan-STARRS 1	·	2.1 km	MPC · JPL
808516	2018 BK_{76}	—	August 13, 2012	Haleakala	Pan-STARRS 1	L5	6.1 km	MPC · JPL
808517	2018 CC_{5}	—	February 14, 2004	Kitt Peak	Spacewatch	PHO	740 m	MPC · JPL
808518	2018 CZ_{8}	—	December 14, 2017	Mount Lemmon	Mount Lemmon Survey	PHO	640 m	MPC · JPL
808519	2018 CG_{10}	—	February 6, 2011	Catalina	CSS	PHO	650 m	MPC · JPL
808520	2018 CF_{12}	—	January 16, 2018	Haleakala	Pan-STARRS 1	·	810 m	MPC · JPL
808521	2018 CX_{13}	—	February 10, 2018	Mount Lemmon	Mount Lemmon Survey	APO	480 m	MPC · JPL
808522	2018 CD_{15}	—	February 3, 2009	Kitt Peak	Spacewatch	·	1.2 km	MPC · JPL
808523	2018 CE_{20}	—	February 11, 2018	Haleakala	Pan-STARRS 1	·	1.6 km	MPC · JPL
808524	2018 CS_{20}	—	May 20, 2015	Cerro Tololo	DECam	·	720 m	MPC · JPL
808525	2018 CP_{22}	—	February 10, 2018	Mount Lemmon	Mount Lemmon Survey	EUN	840 m	MPC · JPL
808526	2018 CJ_{26}	—	February 12, 2018	Haleakala	Pan-STARRS 1	·	2.1 km	MPC · JPL
808527	2018 CJ_{28}	—	February 12, 2018	Haleakala	Pan-STARRS 1	·	1.0 km	MPC · JPL
808528	2018 CV_{28}	—	February 11, 2018	Haleakala	Pan-STARRS 1	(5)	880 m	MPC · JPL
808529	2018 CC_{30}	—	January 11, 2008	Kitt Peak	Spacewatch	KOR	930 m	MPC · JPL
808530	2018 CN_{30}	—	February 10, 2018	Haleakala	Pan-STARRS 1	·	1.5 km	MPC · JPL
808531	2018 CB_{31}	—	November 8, 2007	Kitt Peak	Spacewatch	·	1.4 km	MPC · JPL
808532	2018 DQ_{4}	—	February 23, 2018	Mount Lemmon	Mount Lemmon Survey	PHO	680 m	MPC · JPL
808533	2018 DN_{11}	—	January 15, 2018	Mount Lemmon	Mount Lemmon Survey	·	900 m	MPC · JPL
808534	2018 DU_{11}	—	February 26, 2018	Mount Lemmon	Mount Lemmon Survey	·	1.3 km	MPC · JPL
808535	2018 DV_{11}	—	February 25, 2018	Mount Lemmon	Mount Lemmon Survey	EUN	820 m	MPC · JPL
808536	2018 DF_{15}	—	February 21, 2018	Haleakala	Pan-STARRS 1	DOR	1.7 km	MPC · JPL
808537	2018 DY_{16}	—	February 25, 2018	Mount Lemmon	Mount Lemmon Survey	·	1.9 km	MPC · JPL
808538	2018 EZ_{8}	—	November 25, 2013	Haleakala	Pan-STARRS 1	·	1.1 km	MPC · JPL
808539	2018 EQ_{9}	—	January 14, 2018	Mount Lemmon	Mount Lemmon Survey	·	890 m	MPC · JPL
808540	2018 ER_{10}	—	September 11, 2015	Haleakala	Pan-STARRS 1	·	1.6 km	MPC · JPL
808541	2018 EN_{11}	—	March 7, 2018	Haleakala	Pan-STARRS 1	BRG	1.1 km	MPC · JPL
808542	2018 EF_{12}	—	March 10, 2018	Haleakala	Pan-STARRS 1	·	1.0 km	MPC · JPL
808543	2018 EF_{13}	—	March 7, 2018	Haleakala	Pan-STARRS 1	EOS	1.3 km	MPC · JPL
808544	2018 EL_{13}	—	March 7, 2018	Haleakala	Pan-STARRS 1	·	980 m	MPC · JPL
808545	2018 EX_{13}	—	March 7, 2018	Haleakala	Pan-STARRS 1	·	930 m	MPC · JPL
808546	2018 EN_{15}	—	January 25, 2006	Kitt Peak	Spacewatch	·	2.2 km	MPC · JPL
808547	2018 ES_{17}	—	May 3, 2008	Mount Lemmon	Mount Lemmon Survey	·	440 m	MPC · JPL
808548	2018 EK_{22}	—	July 19, 2015	Haleakala	Pan-STARRS 1	·	620 m	MPC · JPL
808549	2018 FQ_{9}	—	August 13, 2015	Kitt Peak	Spacewatch	·	1.3 km	MPC · JPL
808550	2018 FP_{10}	—	August 14, 2015	Haleakala	Pan-STARRS 1	·	990 m	MPC · JPL
808551	2018 FR_{16}	—	January 14, 2013	Mount Lemmon	Mount Lemmon Survey	DOR	1.7 km	MPC · JPL
808552	2018 FX_{21}	—	March 17, 2018	Haleakala	Pan-STARRS 1	3:2	4.1 km	MPC · JPL
808553	2018 FM_{22}	—	December 4, 2002	Kitt Peak	Deep Ecliptic Survey	·	740 m	MPC · JPL
808554	2018 FW_{27}	—	February 9, 2002	Kitt Peak	Spacewatch	·	1.4 km	MPC · JPL
808555	2018 FR_{29}	—	March 28, 2018	Mount Lemmon	Mount Lemmon Survey	·	1.6 km	MPC · JPL
808556	2018 FW_{34}	—	March 18, 2018	Haleakala	Pan-STARRS 1	·	1.0 km	MPC · JPL
808557	2018 FA_{38}	—	April 26, 2014	Cerro Tololo	DECam	HNS	860 m	MPC · JPL
808558	2018 FO_{39}	—	March 17, 2018	Mount Lemmon	Mount Lemmon Survey	·	1.6 km	MPC · JPL
808559	2018 FQ_{39}	—	March 21, 2018	Mount Lemmon	Mount Lemmon Survey	·	810 m	MPC · JPL
808560	2018 FH_{40}	—	March 18, 2018	Mount Lemmon	Mount Lemmon Survey	·	760 m	MPC · JPL
808561	2018 FU_{40}	—	March 18, 2018	Haleakala	Pan-STARRS 1	3:2 · SHU	4.0 km	MPC · JPL
808562	2018 FG_{41}	—	August 20, 2015	Kitt Peak	Spacewatch	·	1.2 km	MPC · JPL
808563	2018 FC_{47}	—	March 17, 2018	Haleakala	Pan-STARRS 1	·	2.1 km	MPC · JPL
808564	2018 FT_{47}	—	March 17, 2018	Haleakala	Pan-STARRS 1	·	1.4 km	MPC · JPL
808565	2018 FK_{50}	—	April 28, 2014	Cerro Tololo	DECam	·	1.3 km	MPC · JPL
808566	2018 FQ_{50}	—	January 31, 2009	Mount Lemmon	Mount Lemmon Survey	·	1.4 km	MPC · JPL
808567	2018 FT_{53}	—	May 27, 2014	Haleakala	Pan-STARRS 1	·	1.2 km	MPC · JPL
808568	2018 FB_{57}	—	March 16, 2018	Mount Lemmon	Mount Lemmon Survey	·	880 m	MPC · JPL
808569	2018 FL_{64}	—	March 21, 2018	Mount Lemmon	Mount Lemmon Survey	·	1.2 km	MPC · JPL
808570	2018 FU_{67}	—	March 18, 2018	Haleakala	Pan-STARRS 1	·	1.7 km	MPC · JPL
808571	2018 FV_{70}	—	March 19, 2018	Haleakala	Pan-STARRS 1	AST	1.3 km	MPC · JPL
808572	2018 FS_{76}	—	November 30, 2008	Kitt Peak	Spacewatch	·	770 m	MPC · JPL
808573	2018 GA_{6}	—	January 6, 2013	Kitt Peak	Spacewatch	·	1.3 km	MPC · JPL
808574	2018 GG_{6}	—	December 28, 2017	Mount Lemmon	Mount Lemmon Survey	·	690 m	MPC · JPL
808575	2018 GC_{10}	—	March 20, 2018	Mount Lemmon	Mount Lemmon Survey	·	2.2 km	MPC · JPL
808576	2018 GH_{17}	—	April 15, 2018	Mount Lemmon	Mount Lemmon Survey	·	2.1 km	MPC · JPL
808577	2018 GT_{17}	—	April 10, 2018	Mount Lemmon	Mount Lemmon Survey	H	380 m	MPC · JPL
808578	2018 GV_{18}	—	April 14, 2018	Mount Lemmon	Mount Lemmon Survey	·	2.3 km	MPC · JPL
808579	2018 GF_{20}	—	April 12, 2018	Haleakala	Pan-STARRS 1	DOR	1.6 km	MPC · JPL
808580	2018 GX_{22}	—	April 5, 2014	Haleakala	Pan-STARRS 1	·	750 m	MPC · JPL
808581	2018 GS_{23}	—	April 13, 2018	Haleakala	Pan-STARRS 1	·	1.4 km	MPC · JPL
808582	2018 GA_{24}	—	April 15, 2018	Mount Lemmon	Mount Lemmon Survey	·	1.4 km	MPC · JPL
808583	2018 GT_{24}	—	September 10, 2015	Haleakala	Pan-STARRS 1	·	1.5 km	MPC · JPL
808584	2018 GM_{28}	—	April 8, 2002	Palomar Mountain	NEAT	·	1.9 km	MPC · JPL
808585	2018 HG_{7}	—	April 21, 2018	Mount Lemmon	Mount Lemmon Survey	EOS	1.1 km	MPC · JPL
808586	2018 HJ_{9}	—	April 21, 2018	Mount Lemmon	Mount Lemmon Survey	·	1.0 km	MPC · JPL
808587	2018 HY_{10}	—	April 23, 2018	Mount Lemmon	Mount Lemmon Survey	MAR	690 m	MPC · JPL
808588	2018 JD_{5}	—	February 28, 2014	Haleakala	Pan-STARRS 1	AMO · PHA	600 m	MPC · JPL
808589	2018 JH_{5}	—	March 15, 2007	Kitt Peak	Spacewatch	·	890 m	MPC · JPL
808590	2018 JZ_{6}	—	May 9, 2018	Kitt Peak	Spacewatch	·	3.1 km	MPC · JPL
808591	2018 JY_{12}	—	May 13, 2018	Mount Lemmon	Mount Lemmon Survey	·	1.9 km	MPC · JPL
808592	2018 KF_{8}	—	May 20, 2018	Haleakala	Pan-STARRS 1	·	1.9 km	MPC · JPL
808593	2018 KJ_{8}	—	May 20, 2018	Haleakala	Pan-STARRS 1	EOS	1.3 km	MPC · JPL
808594	2018 KM_{10}	—	May 19, 2018	Haleakala	Pan-STARRS 1	ARM	2.7 km	MPC · JPL
808595	2018 KF_{13}	—	February 22, 2017	Haleakala	Pan-STARRS 1	·	2.0 km	MPC · JPL
808596	2018 KH_{16}	—	May 19, 2018	Haleakala	Pan-STARRS 1	·	1.5 km	MPC · JPL
808597	2018 KH_{23}	—	May 19, 2018	Haleakala	Pan-STARRS 1	3:2	3.4 km	MPC · JPL
808598	2018 KQ_{23}	—	May 16, 2018	Mount Lemmon	Mount Lemmon Survey	MAR	670 m	MPC · JPL
808599	2018 LC_{9}	—	February 18, 2017	Haleakala	Pan-STARRS 1	·	2.2 km	MPC · JPL
808600	2018 LO_{22}	—	June 15, 2018	Haleakala	Pan-STARRS 1	L4	5.8 km	MPC · JPL

== 808601–808700 ==
back to top

Designation			Discovery			Properties		Ref
Permanent	Provisional	Named after	Date	Site	Discoverer(s)	Category	Diam.	Ref
808601	2018 LU_{23}	—	June 15, 2018	Haleakala	Pan-STARRS 1	MAR	690 m	MPC · JPL
808602	2018 LT_{25}	—	June 15, 2018	Haleakala	Pan-STARRS 1	L4	7.8 km	MPC · JPL
808603	2018 LN_{28}	—	August 20, 2014	Haleakala	Pan-STARRS 1	·	720 m	MPC · JPL
808604	2018 LV_{29}	—	June 15, 2018	Haleakala	Pan-STARRS 1	L4 · ERY	5.6 km	MPC · JPL
808605	2018 LC_{30}	—	October 1, 2014	Haleakala	Pan-STARRS 1	·	1.3 km	MPC · JPL
808606	2018 LD_{31}	—	November 29, 2014	Mount Lemmon	Mount Lemmon Survey	·	2.3 km	MPC · JPL
808607	2018 LG_{31}	—	June 15, 2018	Haleakala	Pan-STARRS 1	EOS	1.4 km	MPC · JPL
808608	2018 LP_{32}	—	June 15, 2018	Haleakala	Pan-STARRS 1	·	1.3 km	MPC · JPL
808609	2018 LT_{32}	—	June 4, 2018	Haleakala	Pan-STARRS 1	·	1.8 km	MPC · JPL
808610	2018 LH_{34}	—	June 8, 2018	Haleakala	Pan-STARRS 1	·	2.5 km	MPC · JPL
808611	2018 LQ_{35}	—	June 10, 2018	Haleakala	Pan-STARRS 1	EUN	790 m	MPC · JPL
808612	2018 LO_{39}	—	May 6, 2010	Kitt Peak	Spacewatch	T_{j} (2.99) · 3:2	3.4 km	MPC · JPL
808613	2018 LR_{39}	—	June 6, 2018	Haleakala	Pan-STARRS 1	·	860 m	MPC · JPL
808614	2018 LD_{40}	—	June 15, 2018	Haleakala	Pan-STARRS 1	L4 · ERY	5.3 km	MPC · JPL
808615	2018 LM_{41}	—	January 26, 2017	Haleakala	Pan-STARRS 1	·	1.3 km	MPC · JPL
808616	2018 LW_{46}	—	June 4, 2018	Haleakala	Pan-STARRS 1	·	2.0 km	MPC · JPL
808617	2018 LB_{53}	—	June 3, 2018	Haleakala	Pan-STARRS 1	·	880 m	MPC · JPL
808618	2018 MX_{2}	—	June 10, 2018	Haleakala	Pan-STARRS 1	·	1.5 km	MPC · JPL
808619	2018 MQ_{4}	—	February 14, 2013	Haleakala	Pan-STARRS 1	·	820 m	MPC · JPL
808620	2018 MZ_{5}	—	December 17, 2007	Mount Lemmon	Mount Lemmon Survey	·	850 m	MPC · JPL
808621	2018 MT_{9}	—	August 29, 2014	Haleakala	Pan-STARRS 1	·	1.2 km	MPC · JPL
808622	2018 MD_{10}	—	September 3, 2007	Catalina	CSS	·	2.4 km	MPC · JPL
808623	2018 MM_{14}	—	June 17, 2018	Haleakala	Pan-STARRS 1	·	1.4 km	MPC · JPL
808624	2018 MC_{18}	—	June 17, 2018	Haleakala	Pan-STARRS 1	·	1.3 km	MPC · JPL
808625	2018 MH_{21}	—	June 16, 2018	Haleakala	Pan-STARRS 1	BRG	890 m	MPC · JPL
808626	2018 MZ_{21}	—	June 17, 2018	Haleakala	Pan-STARRS 1	·	2.2 km	MPC · JPL
808627	2018 ME_{23}	—	June 17, 2018	Haleakala	Pan-STARRS 1	L4	6.7 km	MPC · JPL
808628	2018 MV_{23}	—	June 18, 2018	Haleakala	Pan-STARRS 1	·	2.1 km	MPC · JPL
808629	2018 MN_{24}	—	June 18, 2018	Haleakala	Pan-STARRS 1	·	1.6 km	MPC · JPL
808630	2018 MT_{24}	—	June 17, 2018	Haleakala	Pan-STARRS 1	L4	6.1 km	MPC · JPL
808631	2018 MC_{25}	—	December 14, 2015	Haleakala	Pan-STARRS 1	·	1.5 km	MPC · JPL
808632	2018 MT_{27}	—	June 23, 2018	Haleakala	Pan-STARRS 1	·	2.0 km	MPC · JPL
808633	2018 MC_{41}	—	June 18, 2018	Haleakala	Pan-STARRS 1	MAR	860 m	MPC · JPL
808634	2018 MP_{43}	—	November 28, 2014	Mount Lemmon	Mount Lemmon Survey	·	2.3 km	MPC · JPL
808635	2018 NZ_{3}	—	February 23, 2007	Siding Spring	SSS	·	890 m	MPC · JPL
808636	2018 NX_{11}	—	April 30, 2012	Kitt Peak	Spacewatch	EOS	1.3 km	MPC · JPL
808637	2018 NY_{13}	—	July 11, 2018	XuYi	PMO NEO Survey Program	·	1.7 km	MPC · JPL
808638	2018 NN_{18}	—	July 10, 2018	Haleakala	Pan-STARRS 1	MAR	610 m	MPC · JPL
808639	2018 NZ_{22}	—	July 12, 2018	Haleakala	Pan-STARRS 1	·	1.1 km	MPC · JPL
808640	2018 NF_{25}	—	July 13, 2018	Haleakala	Pan-STARRS 1	·	1.2 km	MPC · JPL
808641	2018 NT_{27}	—	July 9, 2018	Haleakala	Pan-STARRS 1	L4	5.7 km	MPC · JPL
808642	2018 NF_{30}	—	July 10, 2018	Haleakala	Pan-STARRS 1	EUN	940 m	MPC · JPL
808643	2018 NS_{35}	—	July 12, 2018	Haleakala	Pan-STARRS 1	EOS	1.2 km	MPC · JPL
808644	2018 NT_{35}	—	July 12, 2018	Haleakala	Pan-STARRS 1	·	1.2 km	MPC · JPL
808645	2018 NQ_{36}	—	July 13, 2018	Haleakala	Pan-STARRS 1	·	2.7 km	MPC · JPL
808646	2018 NY_{36}	—	July 13, 2018	Haleakala	Pan-STARRS 1	·	1.6 km	MPC · JPL
808647	2018 NA_{37}	—	July 12, 2018	Haleakala	Pan-STARRS 1	·	1.3 km	MPC · JPL
808648	2018 NN_{39}	—	July 8, 2018	Haleakala	Pan-STARRS 1	·	1.4 km	MPC · JPL
808649	2018 NH_{40}	—	March 1, 2016	Mount Lemmon	Mount Lemmon Survey	·	2.1 km	MPC · JPL
808650	2018 NH_{42}	—	January 17, 2015	Haleakala	Pan-STARRS 1	·	2.0 km	MPC · JPL
808651	2018 NN_{43}	—	February 10, 2016	Mount Lemmon	Mount Lemmon Survey	·	2.4 km	MPC · JPL
808652	2018 NU_{43}	—	July 11, 2018	Haleakala	Pan-STARRS 1	·	2.3 km	MPC · JPL
808653	2018 NU_{45}	—	July 8, 2018	Haleakala	Pan-STARRS 2	·	1.0 km	MPC · JPL
808654	2018 NK_{46}	—	September 18, 2014	Haleakala	Pan-STARRS 1	AEO	770 m	MPC · JPL
808655	2018 NW_{46}	—	July 9, 2018	Haleakala	Pan-STARRS 1	·	1.2 km	MPC · JPL
808656	2018 NE_{65}	—	July 12, 2018	Haleakala	Pan-STARRS 1	·	1.3 km	MPC · JPL
808657	2018 ND_{67}	—	July 10, 2018	Haleakala	Pan-STARRS 1	·	1.3 km	MPC · JPL
808658	2018 NG_{68}	—	July 8, 2018	Haleakala	Pan-STARRS 1	·	830 m	MPC · JPL
808659	2018 NS_{68}	—	December 31, 2011	Kitt Peak	Spacewatch	·	940 m	MPC · JPL
808660	2018 ND_{69}	—	July 13, 2018	Haleakala	Pan-STARRS 1	·	1.8 km	MPC · JPL
808661	2018 NP_{74}	—	July 8, 2018	Haleakala	Pan-STARRS 1	·	2.5 km	MPC · JPL
808662	2018 NY_{79}	—	October 10, 2008	Kitt Peak	Spacewatch	·	1.6 km	MPC · JPL
808663	2018 PQ_{6}	—	November 18, 2014	Mount Lemmon	Mount Lemmon Survey	AGN	840 m	MPC · JPL
808664	2018 PR_{11}	—	June 18, 2018	Haleakala	Pan-STARRS 1	·	2.2 km	MPC · JPL
808665	2018 PW_{11}	—	July 29, 2014	Haleakala	Pan-STARRS 1	·	940 m	MPC · JPL
808666	2018 PC_{15}	—	March 3, 2016	Haleakala	Pan-STARRS 1	·	2.7 km	MPC · JPL
808667	2018 PJ_{23}	—	April 21, 2015	Mount Lemmon	Mount Lemmon Survey	H	430 m	MPC · JPL
808668	2018 PN_{25}	—	September 22, 2014	Kitt Peak	Spacewatch	·	1.4 km	MPC · JPL
808669	2018 PH_{28}	—	April 3, 2017	Haleakala	Pan-STARRS 1	·	720 m	MPC · JPL
808670	2018 PB_{30}	—	February 11, 2016	Haleakala	Pan-STARRS 1	·	1.1 km	MPC · JPL
808671	2018 PH_{31}	—	January 30, 2016	Mount Lemmon	Mount Lemmon Survey	·	870 m	MPC · JPL
808672	2018 PD_{32}	—	July 12, 2018	Haleakala	Pan-STARRS 1	·	2.5 km	MPC · JPL
808673	2018 PN_{41}	—	August 11, 2018	Haleakala	Pan-STARRS 1	·	1.4 km	MPC · JPL
808674	2018 PL_{42}	—	August 8, 2018	Haleakala	Pan-STARRS 1	·	3.6 km	MPC · JPL
808675	2018 PT_{42}	—	August 8, 2018	Haleakala	Pan-STARRS 1	·	950 m	MPC · JPL
808676	2018 PV_{42}	—	August 5, 2018	Haleakala	Pan-STARRS 1	·	1.9 km	MPC · JPL
808677	2018 PM_{43}	—	August 14, 2018	Kitt Peak	Spacewatch	·	1.2 km	MPC · JPL
808678	2018 PE_{44}	—	August 11, 2018	Haleakala	Pan-STARRS 1	·	1.2 km	MPC · JPL
808679	2018 PR_{44}	—	August 7, 2018	Haleakala	Pan-STARRS 1	EOS	1.2 km	MPC · JPL
808680	2018 PN_{45}	—	August 14, 2018	Haleakala	Pan-STARRS 1	·	1.3 km	MPC · JPL
808681	2018 PS_{45}	—	August 5, 2018	Haleakala	Pan-STARRS 1	MAR	860 m	MPC · JPL
808682	2018 PL_{46}	—	August 5, 2018	Haleakala	Pan-STARRS 1	·	2.0 km	MPC · JPL
808683	2018 PF_{50}	—	August 13, 2018	Haleakala	Pan-STARRS 1	·	1.1 km	MPC · JPL
808684	2018 PV_{50}	—	August 14, 2018	Haleakala	Pan-STARRS 1	·	950 m	MPC · JPL
808685	2018 PE_{53}	—	August 12, 2018	Haleakala	Pan-STARRS 1	·	2.2 km	MPC · JPL
808686	2018 PJ_{55}	—	August 14, 2018	Haleakala	Pan-STARRS 1	·	2.3 km	MPC · JPL
808687	2018 PX_{55}	—	August 13, 2018	Haleakala	Pan-STARRS 1	·	2.9 km	MPC · JPL
808688	2018 PF_{56}	—	August 13, 2018	Haleakala	Pan-STARRS 1	·	1.6 km	MPC · JPL
808689	2018 PL_{56}	—	August 6, 2018	Haleakala	Pan-STARRS 1	·	1.8 km	MPC · JPL
808690	2018 PX_{56}	—	August 8, 2018	Haleakala	Pan-STARRS 1	·	1.0 km	MPC · JPL
808691	2018 PV_{58}	—	July 10, 2018	Haleakala	Pan-STARRS 1	·	1.3 km	MPC · JPL
808692	2018 PH_{60}	—	May 22, 2015	Cerro Tololo	DECam	L4	5.3 km	MPC · JPL
808693	2018 PK_{61}	—	August 11, 2018	Haleakala	Pan-STARRS 1	(29841)	920 m	MPC · JPL
808694	2018 PL_{62}	—	August 7, 2018	Haleakala	Pan-STARRS 1	·	1.2 km	MPC · JPL
808695	2018 PM_{62}	—	August 12, 2018	Haleakala	Pan-STARRS 1	EUN	930 m	MPC · JPL
808696	2018 PL_{64}	—	August 7, 2018	Haleakala	Pan-STARRS 1	·	1.7 km	MPC · JPL
808697	2018 PO_{64}	—	August 11, 2018	Haleakala	Pan-STARRS 1	EUN	720 m	MPC · JPL
808698	2018 PN_{67}	—	August 5, 2018	Haleakala	Pan-STARRS 1	·	2.0 km	MPC · JPL
808699	2018 PU_{68}	—	January 4, 2012	Mount Lemmon	Mount Lemmon Survey	·	710 m	MPC · JPL
808700	2018 PX_{68}	—	August 7, 2018	Haleakala	Pan-STARRS 1	L4	5.4 km	MPC · JPL

== 808701–808800 ==
back to top

Designation			Discovery			Properties		Ref
Permanent	Provisional	Named after	Date	Site	Discoverer(s)	Category	Diam.	Ref
808701	2018 PD_{69}	—	August 7, 2018	Haleakala	Pan-STARRS 1	L4	5.8 km	MPC · JPL
808702	2018 PF_{69}	—	August 7, 2018	Haleakala	Pan-STARRS 1	·	1.2 km	MPC · JPL
808703	2018 PT_{74}	—	August 11, 2018	Haleakala	Pan-STARRS 1	·	670 m	MPC · JPL
808704	2018 PZ_{79}	—	August 12, 2018	Haleakala	Pan-STARRS 1	·	1.1 km	MPC · JPL
808705	2018 PC_{80}	—	August 8, 2018	Haleakala	Pan-STARRS 1	·	1.5 km	MPC · JPL
808706	2018 PR_{80}	—	August 6, 2018	Haleakala	Pan-STARRS 1	·	1.2 km	MPC · JPL
808707	2018 PR_{91}	—	August 11, 2018	Haleakala	Pan-STARRS 1	·	750 m	MPC · JPL
808708	2018 PS_{94}	—	August 7, 2018	Haleakala	Pan-STARRS 1	·	690 m	MPC · JPL
808709	2018 PH_{103}	—	August 8, 2018	Haleakala	Pan-STARRS 1	·	1.2 km	MPC · JPL
808710	2018 PE_{106}	—	August 13, 2018	Haleakala	Pan-STARRS 1	·	1.8 km	MPC · JPL
808711	2018 PT_{117}	—	August 13, 2018	Haleakala	Pan-STARRS 1	·	1.5 km	MPC · JPL
808712	2018 PJ_{119}	—	August 8, 2018	Haleakala	Pan-STARRS 1	KOR	970 m	MPC · JPL
808713	2018 PZ_{119}	—	August 8, 2018	Haleakala	Pan-STARRS 1	·	1.3 km	MPC · JPL
808714	2018 PE_{121}	—	August 14, 2018	Haleakala	Pan-STARRS 1	EOS	1.2 km	MPC · JPL
808715	2018 PF_{121}	—	August 14, 2018	Haleakala	Pan-STARRS 1	EOS	1.2 km	MPC · JPL
808716	2018 PW_{127}	—	August 11, 2018	Haleakala	Pan-STARRS 1	·	1.2 km	MPC · JPL
808717	2018 PO_{128}	—	December 11, 2014	Mount Lemmon	Mount Lemmon Survey	·	1.4 km	MPC · JPL
808718	2018 PO_{130}	—	August 7, 2018	Haleakala	Pan-STARRS 1	·	770 m	MPC · JPL
808719	2018 PP_{130}	—	October 30, 2014	Haleakala	Pan-STARRS 1	·	1.1 km	MPC · JPL
808720	2018 PV_{132}	—	August 8, 2018	Haleakala	Pan-STARRS 1	·	990 m	MPC · JPL
808721	2018 PW_{132}	—	August 8, 2018	Haleakala	Pan-STARRS 1	·	1.1 km	MPC · JPL
808722	2018 PZ_{143}	—	August 7, 2018	Haleakala	Pan-STARRS 1	·	2.5 km	MPC · JPL
808723	2018 PV_{156}	—	August 13, 2018	Haleakala	Pan-STARRS 1	·	2.1 km	MPC · JPL
808724	2018 PO_{157}	—	August 13, 2018	Haleakala	Pan-STARRS 1	·	1.9 km	MPC · JPL
808725	2018 PN_{161}	—	August 7, 2018	Haleakala	Pan-STARRS 1	·	1.3 km	MPC · JPL
808726	2018 QD	—	February 16, 2015	Haleakala	Pan-STARRS 1	H	350 m	MPC · JPL
808727	2018 QS_{4}	—	August 6, 2018	Haleakala	Pan-STARRS 1	EOS	1.2 km	MPC · JPL
808728	2018 QM_{5}	—	August 15, 2013	Haleakala	Pan-STARRS 1	·	1.5 km	MPC · JPL
808729	2018 QT_{7}	—	August 22, 2018	Haleakala	Pan-STARRS 1	·	1.5 km	MPC · JPL
808730	2018 QD_{10}	—	October 4, 2007	Kitt Peak	Spacewatch	LIX	2.5 km	MPC · JPL
808731	2018 QC_{11}	—	August 19, 2018	Haleakala	Pan-STARRS 1	·	1.5 km	MPC · JPL
808732	2018 QF_{12}	—	August 18, 2018	Haleakala	Pan-STARRS 1	·	1.9 km	MPC · JPL
808733	2018 QM_{12}	—	August 19, 2018	Haleakala	Pan-STARRS 1	·	1.2 km	MPC · JPL
808734	2018 QO_{12}	—	August 18, 2018	Haleakala	Pan-STARRS 1	·	1.6 km	MPC · JPL
808735	2018 QA_{15}	—	August 22, 2018	Haleakala	Pan-STARRS 1	·	1.8 km	MPC · JPL
808736	2018 QS_{16}	—	August 18, 2018	Haleakala	Pan-STARRS 1	·	860 m	MPC · JPL
808737	2018 QY_{16}	—	August 18, 2018	Haleakala	Pan-STARRS 1	AGN	700 m	MPC · JPL
808738	2018 QD_{17}	—	August 17, 2018	Haleakala	Pan-STARRS 1	·	1.1 km	MPC · JPL
808739	2018 QF_{17}	—	August 18, 2018	Haleakala	Pan-STARRS 1	·	1.1 km	MPC · JPL
808740	2018 QQ_{17}	—	August 22, 2018	Haleakala	Pan-STARRS 1	·	1.1 km	MPC · JPL
808741	2018 QD_{18}	—	August 17, 2018	Haleakala	Pan-STARRS 1	·	950 m	MPC · JPL
808742	2018 QN_{18}	—	August 22, 2018	Haleakala	Pan-STARRS 1	EOS	1.2 km	MPC · JPL
808743	2018 QV_{19}	—	August 18, 2018	Haleakala	Pan-STARRS 1	·	2.0 km	MPC · JPL
808744	2018 QX_{22}	—	August 22, 2018	Haleakala	Pan-STARRS 1	·	1.8 km	MPC · JPL
808745	2018 QT_{26}	—	August 17, 2018	Haleakala	Pan-STARRS 1	WIT	640 m	MPC · JPL
808746	2018 QY_{34}	—	August 17, 2018	Haleakala	Pan-STARRS 1	·	2.3 km	MPC · JPL
808747	2018 QL_{35}	—	August 19, 2018	Haleakala	Pan-STARRS 1	·	2.3 km	MPC · JPL
808748	2018 RJ_{15}	—	October 15, 2002	Palomar Mountain	NEAT	·	2.1 km	MPC · JPL
808749	2018 RA_{23}	—	June 30, 2014	Haleakala	Pan-STARRS 1	EUN	930 m	MPC · JPL
808750	2018 RT_{29}	—	August 6, 2018	Haleakala	Pan-STARRS 1	H	400 m	MPC · JPL
808751	2018 RM_{31}	—	August 7, 2018	Haleakala	Pan-STARRS 1	(1547)	1.2 km	MPC · JPL
808752	2018 RV_{36}	—	June 4, 2014	Haleakala	Pan-STARRS 1	·	810 m	MPC · JPL
808753	2018 RT_{39}	—	September 9, 2004	Kitt Peak	Spacewatch	·	1.6 km	MPC · JPL
808754	2018 RD_{43}	—	September 11, 2018	Mount Lemmon	Mount Lemmon Survey	·	1.8 km	MPC · JPL
808755	2018 RV_{43}	—	September 8, 2018	Mount Lemmon	Mount Lemmon Survey	·	2.3 km	MPC · JPL
808756	2018 RQ_{46}	—	September 9, 2018	Mount Lemmon	Mount Lemmon Survey	·	1.4 km	MPC · JPL
808757	2018 RF_{48}	—	September 8, 2018	Mount Lemmon	Mount Lemmon Survey	·	2.3 km	MPC · JPL
808758	2018 RE_{49}	—	September 12, 2018	Mount Lemmon	Mount Lemmon Survey	·	1.5 km	MPC · JPL
808759	2018 RF_{50}	—	September 13, 2018	Mount Lemmon	Mount Lemmon Survey	·	1.8 km	MPC · JPL
808760	2018 RK_{50}	—	September 13, 2018	Mount Lemmon	Mount Lemmon Survey	·	940 m	MPC · JPL
808761	2018 RF_{52}	—	September 10, 2018	Mount Lemmon	Mount Lemmon Survey	·	2.1 km	MPC · JPL
808762	2018 RS_{52}	—	September 10, 2018	Mount Lemmon	Mount Lemmon Survey	·	1.5 km	MPC · JPL
808763	2018 RM_{53}	—	September 11, 2018	Mount Lemmon	Mount Lemmon Survey	·	1.7 km	MPC · JPL
808764	2018 RW_{53}	—	September 13, 2018	Mount Lemmon	Mount Lemmon Survey	MAR	750 m	MPC · JPL
808765	2018 RZ_{56}	—	July 10, 2018	Haleakala	Pan-STARRS 1	·	1.1 km	MPC · JPL
808766	2018 RL_{57}	—	August 13, 2018	Haleakala	Pan-STARRS 1	·	850 m	MPC · JPL
808767	2018 RX_{57}	—	September 8, 2018	XuYi	PMO NEO Survey Program	·	920 m	MPC · JPL
808768	2018 RD_{58}	—	August 7, 2018	Haleakala	Pan-STARRS 1	·	1.1 km	MPC · JPL
808769	2018 RU_{58}	—	September 13, 2018	Mount Lemmon	Mount Lemmon Survey	·	1.2 km	MPC · JPL
808770	2018 RE_{62}	—	September 12, 2018	Mount Lemmon	Mount Lemmon Survey	·	1.4 km	MPC · JPL
808771	2018 RW_{62}	—	April 3, 2016	Haleakala	Pan-STARRS 1	·	1.7 km	MPC · JPL
808772	2018 RC_{63}	—	September 10, 2018	Mount Lemmon	Mount Lemmon Survey	·	1.5 km	MPC · JPL
808773	2018 RJ_{64}	—	September 10, 2018	Mount Lemmon	Mount Lemmon Survey	·	1.6 km	MPC · JPL
808774	2018 RM_{64}	—	September 9, 2018	Mount Lemmon	Mount Lemmon Survey	MAR	870 m	MPC · JPL
808775	2018 RS_{64}	—	September 14, 2018	Mount Lemmon	Mount Lemmon Survey	·	1.4 km	MPC · JPL
808776	2018 RK_{65}	—	September 8, 2018	Mount Lemmon	Mount Lemmon Survey	·	1.7 km	MPC · JPL
808777	2018 RB_{66}	—	September 13, 2018	Mount Lemmon	Mount Lemmon Survey	AGN	800 m	MPC · JPL
808778	2018 RX_{67}	—	September 10, 2018	Mount Lemmon	Mount Lemmon Survey	EUN	790 m	MPC · JPL
808779	2018 RE_{68}	—	September 15, 2018	Mount Lemmon	Mount Lemmon Survey	526	1.8 km	MPC · JPL
808780	2018 RH_{69}	—	September 9, 2018	Mount Lemmon	Mount Lemmon Survey	·	940 m	MPC · JPL
808781	2018 RL_{70}	—	September 10, 2018	Mount Lemmon	Mount Lemmon Survey	·	1.2 km	MPC · JPL
808782	2018 RA_{76}	—	September 14, 2018	Palomar Mountain	Zwicky Transient Facility	·	3.2 km	MPC · JPL
808783	2018 RG_{77}	—	September 11, 2018	Mount Lemmon	Mount Lemmon Survey	·	2.1 km	MPC · JPL
808784	2018 RP_{81}	—	September 7, 2018	Mount Lemmon	Mount Lemmon Survey	·	1.4 km	MPC · JPL
808785	2018 RU_{81}	—	September 14, 2018	Mount Lemmon	Mount Lemmon Survey	KOR	780 m	MPC · JPL
808786	2018 RE_{94}	—	December 18, 2007	Mount Lemmon	Mount Lemmon Survey	·	2.8 km	MPC · JPL
808787	2018 RR_{96}	—	March 1, 2016	Mount Lemmon	Mount Lemmon Survey	·	1.2 km	MPC · JPL
808788	2018 SJ_{4}	—	September 8, 2001	Socorro	LINEAR	·	1.0 km	MPC · JPL
808789	2018 SL_{15}	—	November 24, 2011	Haleakala	Pan-STARRS 1	T_{j} (2.92)	2.3 km	MPC · JPL
808790	2018 SG_{16}	—	September 21, 2018	Haleakala	Pan-STARRS 2	LIX	2.6 km	MPC · JPL
808791	2018 SR_{17}	—	September 19, 2018	Haleakala	Pan-STARRS 2	·	1.0 km	MPC · JPL
808792	2018 SH_{18}	—	September 18, 2018	Mount Lemmon	Mount Lemmon Survey	H	400 m	MPC · JPL
808793	2018 SR_{18}	—	September 30, 2018	Mount Lemmon	Mount Lemmon Survey	·	1.2 km	MPC · JPL
808794	2018 SY_{18}	—	October 15, 2014	Kitt Peak	Spacewatch	·	920 m	MPC · JPL
808795	2018 SX_{21}	—	September 22, 2018	Haleakala	Pan-STARRS 2	BAR	920 m	MPC · JPL
808796	2018 SO_{23}	—	September 19, 2018	Haleakala	Pan-STARRS 2	·	830 m	MPC · JPL
808797	2018 SE_{28}	—	September 19, 2018	Haleakala	Pan-STARRS 2	·	2.1 km	MPC · JPL
808798	2018 TJ_{7}	—	March 13, 2016	Haleakala	Pan-STARRS 1	·	1.7 km	MPC · JPL
808799	2018 TP_{11}	—	August 31, 2005	Kitt Peak	Spacewatch	·	1.0 km	MPC · JPL
808800	2018 TN_{12}	—	September 2, 2014	Haleakala	Pan-STARRS 1	·	810 m	MPC · JPL

== 808801–808900 ==
back to top

Designation			Discovery			Properties		Ref
Permanent	Provisional	Named after	Date	Site	Discoverer(s)	Category	Diam.	Ref
808801	2018 TA_{17}	—	November 16, 2014	Mount Lemmon	Mount Lemmon Survey	·	1.1 km	MPC · JPL
808802	2018 TE_{23}	—	October 10, 2018	Haleakala	Pan-STARRS 2	T_{j} (2.98)	1.8 km	MPC · JPL
808803	2018 TU_{23}	—	October 4, 2018	Haleakala	Pan-STARRS 2	·	1.0 km	MPC · JPL
808804	2018 TM_{25}	—	May 1, 2016	Cerro Tololo	DECam	·	1.8 km	MPC · JPL
808805	2018 TW_{25}	—	October 4, 2018	Haleakala	Pan-STARRS 2	·	1.2 km	MPC · JPL
808806	2018 TK_{26}	—	October 4, 2018	Haleakala	Pan-STARRS 2	·	970 m	MPC · JPL
808807	2018 TL_{26}	—	October 4, 2018	Haleakala	Pan-STARRS 2	AGN	760 m	MPC · JPL
808808	2018 TC_{27}	—	October 4, 2018	Haleakala	Pan-STARRS 2	·	1.9 km	MPC · JPL
808809	2018 TK_{27}	—	October 5, 2018	Haleakala	Pan-STARRS 2	·	1.0 km	MPC · JPL
808810	2018 TV_{29}	—	October 15, 2018	Haleakala	Pan-STARRS 2	·	1.6 km	MPC · JPL
808811 Tarczaygyörgy	2018 TY_{29}	Tarczaygyörgy	October 5, 2018	Piszkés-tető	D. Tarczay-Nehéz, K. Sárneczky	·	1.4 km	MPC · JPL
808812	2018 TZ_{29}	—	October 4, 2018	Haleakala	Pan-STARRS 2	EOS	1.5 km	MPC · JPL
808813	2018 TA_{30}	—	March 13, 2016	Haleakala	Pan-STARRS 1	·	1.1 km	MPC · JPL
808814	2018 TA_{31}	—	October 4, 2018	Haleakala	Pan-STARRS 2	·	1.9 km	MPC · JPL
808815	2018 TG_{31}	—	October 10, 2018	Haleakala	Pan-STARRS 2	·	1.4 km	MPC · JPL
808816	2018 TH_{34}	—	October 5, 2018	Mount Lemmon	Mount Lemmon Survey	·	1.3 km	MPC · JPL
808817	2018 TJ_{34}	—	October 10, 2018	Mount Lemmon	Mount Lemmon Survey	·	1.4 km	MPC · JPL
808818	2018 TK_{36}	—	October 5, 2018	Haleakala	Pan-STARRS 2	·	1.0 km	MPC · JPL
808819	2018 TY_{36}	—	April 30, 2016	Haleakala	Pan-STARRS 1	·	1.9 km	MPC · JPL
808820	2018 TJ_{38}	—	October 4, 2018	Haleakala	Pan-STARRS 2	·	1.1 km	MPC · JPL
808821	2018 TK_{38}	—	August 7, 2018	Haleakala	Pan-STARRS 1	·	1.1 km	MPC · JPL
808822	2018 TT_{39}	—	March 29, 2016	Cerro Tololo-DECam	DECam	EOS	1.5 km	MPC · JPL
808823	2018 TC_{40}	—	October 4, 2018	Haleakala	Pan-STARRS 2	·	2.0 km	MPC · JPL
808824	2018 TM_{40}	—	October 10, 2018	Haleakala	Pan-STARRS 2	·	1.3 km	MPC · JPL
808825	2018 TT_{40}	—	October 10, 2018	Haleakala	Pan-STARRS 2	·	970 m	MPC · JPL
808826	2018 TH_{41}	—	October 3, 2018	Haleakala	Pan-STARRS 2	·	1.7 km	MPC · JPL
808827	2018 TJ_{41}	—	September 24, 2013	Mount Lemmon	Mount Lemmon Survey	·	1.2 km	MPC · JPL
808828	2018 TH_{42}	—	October 15, 2018	Haleakala	Pan-STARRS 2	·	1.6 km	MPC · JPL
808829	2018 TL_{44}	—	October 15, 2018	Haleakala	Pan-STARRS 2	·	1.6 km	MPC · JPL
808830	2018 TV_{44}	—	October 10, 2018	Haleakala	Pan-STARRS 2	·	1.1 km	MPC · JPL
808831	2018 TH_{45}	—	October 4, 2018	Haleakala	Pan-STARRS 2	·	1.1 km	MPC · JPL
808832	2018 TL_{45}	—	November 8, 2013	Mount Lemmon	Mount Lemmon Survey	·	1.8 km	MPC · JPL
808833	2018 TD_{46}	—	October 10, 2018	Mount Lemmon	Mount Lemmon Survey	·	1.5 km	MPC · JPL
808834	2018 TK_{48}	—	October 10, 2018	Haleakala	Pan-STARRS 2	EOS	1.4 km	MPC · JPL
808835	2018 TW_{48}	—	October 5, 2018	Mount Lemmon	Mount Lemmon Survey	·	1.2 km	MPC · JPL
808836	2018 TM_{50}	—	October 5, 2018	Haleakala	Pan-STARRS 2	·	1.1 km	MPC · JPL
808837	2018 TS_{52}	—	October 25, 2009	Kitt Peak	Spacewatch	PAD	1.1 km	MPC · JPL
808838	2018 TZ_{52}	—	October 10, 2018	Mount Lemmon	Mount Lemmon Survey	·	1.2 km	MPC · JPL
808839	2018 TL_{53}	—	October 5, 2018	Mount Lemmon	Mount Lemmon Survey	·	1.3 km	MPC · JPL
808840	2018 TR_{54}	—	October 5, 2018	Mount Lemmon	Mount Lemmon Survey	·	990 m	MPC · JPL
808841	2018 TT_{55}	—	October 5, 2018	Mount Lemmon	Mount Lemmon Survey	·	1.0 km	MPC · JPL
808842	2018 TX_{55}	—	October 10, 2018	Mount Lemmon	Mount Lemmon Survey	·	1.2 km	MPC · JPL
808843	2018 TQ_{56}	—	October 10, 2018	Mount Lemmon	Mount Lemmon Survey	·	1.2 km	MPC · JPL
808844	2018 TR_{56}	—	October 10, 2018	Mount Lemmon	Mount Lemmon Survey	·	1.2 km	MPC · JPL
808845	2018 TH_{60}	—	March 14, 2016	Mount Lemmon	Mount Lemmon Survey	(5)	670 m	MPC · JPL
808846	2018 TN_{61}	—	October 4, 2018	Haleakala	Pan-STARRS 2	·	1.1 km	MPC · JPL
808847	2018 TC_{64}	—	October 6, 2018	Mount Lemmon	Mount Lemmon Survey	·	1.2 km	MPC · JPL
808848	2018 TC_{65}	—	October 5, 2018	Haleakala	Pan-STARRS 2	·	2.2 km	MPC · JPL
808849	2018 TE_{65}	—	October 10, 2018	Haleakala	Pan-STARRS 2	·	2.0 km	MPC · JPL
808850	2018 TO_{67}	—	October 15, 2018	Haleakala	Pan-STARRS 2	·	1.7 km	MPC · JPL
808851	2018 TL_{68}	—	October 6, 2018	Mount Lemmon	Mount Lemmon Survey	·	1.9 km	MPC · JPL
808852	2018 TF_{69}	—	October 15, 2018	Haleakala	Pan-STARRS 2	·	1.4 km	MPC · JPL
808853	2018 TB_{70}	—	October 5, 2018	Mount Lemmon	Mount Lemmon Survey	·	1.5 km	MPC · JPL
808854	2018 TL_{70}	—	October 4, 2018	Haleakala	Pan-STARRS 2	·	1.3 km	MPC · JPL
808855	2018 TQ_{71}	—	October 5, 2018	Haleakala	Pan-STARRS 2	·	1.5 km	MPC · JPL
808856	2018 TN_{72}	—	January 16, 2015	Haleakala	Pan-STARRS 1	KOR	880 m	MPC · JPL
808857	2018 TV_{73}	—	October 4, 2018	Haleakala	Pan-STARRS 2	KOR	960 m	MPC · JPL
808858	2018 TW_{73}	—	October 6, 2018	Mount Lemmon	Mount Lemmon Survey	·	1.4 km	MPC · JPL
808859	2018 TK_{74}	—	October 6, 2018	Mount Lemmon	Mount Lemmon Survey	·	1.2 km	MPC · JPL
808860	2018 TN_{74}	—	October 10, 2018	Haleakala	Pan-STARRS 2	615	950 m	MPC · JPL
808861	2018 TB_{82}	—	January 20, 2015	Haleakala	Pan-STARRS 1	·	2.1 km	MPC · JPL
808862	2018 UY	—	October 16, 2018	Haleakala	Pan-STARRS 2	APO · PHA	250 m	MPC · JPL
808863	2018 UW_{13}	—	October 18, 2018	Mount Lemmon	Mount Lemmon Survey	·	2.0 km	MPC · JPL
808864	2018 UE_{19}	—	March 28, 2016	Cerro Tololo	DECam	EUN	940 m	MPC · JPL
808865	2018 UV_{20}	—	October 17, 2018	Haleakala	Pan-STARRS 2	BRA	990 m	MPC · JPL
808866	2018 UX_{20}	—	October 18, 2018	Mount Lemmon	Mount Lemmon Survey	·	1.9 km	MPC · JPL
808867	2018 UA_{22}	—	October 17, 2018	Haleakala	Pan-STARRS 2	·	1.9 km	MPC · JPL
808868	2018 UK_{22}	—	October 17, 2018	Haleakala	Pan-STARRS 2	·	1.3 km	MPC · JPL
808869	2018 UY_{24}	—	October 18, 2018	Mount Lemmon	Mount Lemmon Survey	·	1.2 km	MPC · JPL
808870	2018 UF_{26}	—	September 8, 2018	Catalina	CSS	·	1.3 km	MPC · JPL
808871	2018 UQ_{26}	—	March 6, 2016	Haleakala	Pan-STARRS 1	·	1.4 km	MPC · JPL
808872	2018 UY_{26}	—	October 16, 2018	Haleakala	Pan-STARRS 2	AGN	780 m	MPC · JPL
808873	2018 UF_{27}	—	October 18, 2018	Mount Lemmon	Mount Lemmon Survey	·	1.4 km	MPC · JPL
808874	2018 UH_{28}	—	October 18, 2018	Mount Lemmon	Mount Lemmon Survey	615	1.1 km	MPC · JPL
808875	2018 UU_{28}	—	April 15, 2016	Haleakala	Pan-STARRS 1	HNS	670 m	MPC · JPL
808876	2018 UR_{29}	—	October 18, 2018	Mount Lemmon	Mount Lemmon Survey	·	1.3 km	MPC · JPL
808877	2018 UZ_{29}	—	October 17, 2018	Haleakala	Pan-STARRS 2	·	1.5 km	MPC · JPL
808878	2018 UA_{35}	—	October 18, 2018	Mount Lemmon	Mount Lemmon Survey	·	1.3 km	MPC · JPL
808879	2018 UC_{35}	—	October 20, 2018	Mount Lemmon	Mount Lemmon Survey	·	1.4 km	MPC · JPL
808880	2018 UH_{35}	—	January 13, 2015	Haleakala	Pan-STARRS 1	·	1.4 km	MPC · JPL
808881	2018 UG_{40}	—	January 17, 2015	Mount Lemmon	Mount Lemmon Survey	AGN	860 m	MPC · JPL
808882	2018 UU_{40}	—	October 17, 2018	Haleakala	Pan-STARRS 2	·	1.2 km	MPC · JPL
808883	2018 UD_{45}	—	October 17, 2018	Haleakala	Pan-STARRS 2	·	910 m	MPC · JPL
808884	2018 UP_{45}	—	October 16, 2018	Haleakala	Pan-STARRS 2	·	910 m	MPC · JPL
808885	2018 UN_{50}	—	June 25, 2017	Haleakala	Pan-STARRS 1	·	2.2 km	MPC · JPL
808886	2018 UO_{51}	—	October 16, 2018	Haleakala	Pan-STARRS 2	·	1.4 km	MPC · JPL
808887	2018 UT_{52}	—	October 16, 2018	Haleakala	Pan-STARRS 2	·	1.1 km	MPC · JPL
808888	2018 UM_{56}	—	October 16, 2018	Haleakala	Pan-STARRS 2	·	2.1 km	MPC · JPL
808889	2018 VW_{17}	—	August 28, 2013	Mount Lemmon	Mount Lemmon Survey	·	1.4 km	MPC · JPL
808890	2018 VA_{18}	—	March 19, 2009	Mount Lemmon	Mount Lemmon Survey	·	1.8 km	MPC · JPL
808891	2018 VS_{18}	—	September 17, 2018	Mount Lemmon	Mount Lemmon Survey	·	2.4 km	MPC · JPL
808892	2018 VK_{25}	—	November 13, 2007	Mount Lemmon	Mount Lemmon Survey	·	2.2 km	MPC · JPL
808893	2018 VP_{26}	—	September 12, 2018	Mount Lemmon	Mount Lemmon Survey	EUN	930 m	MPC · JPL
808894	2018 VL_{31}	—	September 8, 2018	Mount Lemmon	Mount Lemmon Survey	·	1.4 km	MPC · JPL
808895	2018 VR_{31}	—	October 9, 2012	Mount Lemmon	Mount Lemmon Survey	·	2.3 km	MPC · JPL
808896	2018 VR_{33}	—	March 2, 2009	Kitt Peak	Spacewatch	·	1.4 km	MPC · JPL
808897	2018 VD_{38}	—	October 20, 2018	Mount Lemmon	Mount Lemmon Survey	·	1.3 km	MPC · JPL
808898	2018 VG_{42}	—	February 16, 2015	Haleakala	Pan-STARRS 1	·	2.0 km	MPC · JPL
808899	2018 VY_{46}	—	May 3, 2016	Cerro Tololo	DECam	·	1.4 km	MPC · JPL
808900	2018 VZ_{46}	—	August 15, 2013	Haleakala	Pan-STARRS 1	·	1.1 km	MPC · JPL

== 808901–809000 ==
back to top

Designation			Discovery			Properties		Ref
Permanent	Provisional	Named after	Date	Site	Discoverer(s)	Category	Diam.	Ref
808901	2018 VC_{47}	—	September 24, 2013	Mount Lemmon	Mount Lemmon Survey	HOF	2.2 km	MPC · JPL
808902	2018 VS_{47}	—	June 12, 2013	Mount Lemmon	Mount Lemmon Survey	EUN	790 m	MPC · JPL
808903	2018 VT_{47}	—	August 15, 2013	Haleakala	Pan-STARRS 1	·	1.1 km	MPC · JPL
808904	2018 VJ_{49}	—	November 1, 2018	Mount Lemmon	Mount Lemmon Survey	·	2.4 km	MPC · JPL
808905	2018 VF_{50}	—	October 10, 2018	Mount Lemmon	Mount Lemmon Survey	·	900 m	MPC · JPL
808906	2018 VM_{52}	—	October 22, 2005	Kitt Peak	Spacewatch	·	1.2 km	MPC · JPL
808907	2018 VC_{56}	—	October 11, 2012	Haleakala	Pan-STARRS 1	·	2.2 km	MPC · JPL
808908	2018 VE_{60}	—	November 2, 2018	Haleakala	Pan-STARRS 2	·	1.9 km	MPC · JPL
808909	2018 VQ_{70}	—	July 16, 2013	Haleakala	Pan-STARRS 1	EUN	1.0 km	MPC · JPL
808910	2018 VM_{75}	—	January 13, 2011	Kitt Peak	Spacewatch	·	1.3 km	MPC · JPL
808911	2018 VC_{76}	—	February 10, 2014	Haleakala	Pan-STARRS 1	T_{j} (2.98)	2.1 km	MPC · JPL
808912	2018 VJ_{79}	—	November 21, 2014	Haleakala	Pan-STARRS 1	·	1.2 km	MPC · JPL
808913	2018 VK_{88}	—	October 26, 2014	Mount Lemmon	Mount Lemmon Survey	·	970 m	MPC · JPL
808914	2018 VO_{92}	—	May 2, 2016	Mount Lemmon	Mount Lemmon Survey	·	2.0 km	MPC · JPL
808915	2018 VG_{93}	—	January 14, 2015	Haleakala	Pan-STARRS 1	·	1.3 km	MPC · JPL
808916	2018 VO_{94}	—	November 6, 2018	Haleakala	Pan-STARRS 2	·	1.7 km	MPC · JPL
808917	2018 VS_{95}	—	April 26, 2017	Haleakala	Pan-STARRS 1	·	1.2 km	MPC · JPL
808918	2018 VU_{95}	—	January 27, 2015	Haleakala	Pan-STARRS 1	·	1.3 km	MPC · JPL
808919	2018 VB_{98}	—	November 1, 2018	Mount Lemmon	Mount Lemmon Survey	·	920 m	MPC · JPL
808920	2018 VH_{100}	—	November 6, 2018	Haleakala	Pan-STARRS 2	·	870 m	MPC · JPL
808921	2018 VY_{100}	—	July 28, 2013	Kitt Peak	Spacewatch	·	1.5 km	MPC · JPL
808922	2018 VK_{101}	—	October 10, 2012	Mount Lemmon	Mount Lemmon Survey	·	2.0 km	MPC · JPL
808923	2018 VF_{104}	—	January 27, 2015	Haleakala	Pan-STARRS 1	EOS	1.2 km	MPC · JPL
808924	2018 VH_{105}	—	September 1, 2013	Mount Lemmon	Mount Lemmon Survey	·	1.2 km	MPC · JPL
808925	2018 VH_{106}	—	January 3, 2014	Mount Lemmon	Mount Lemmon Survey	·	1.8 km	MPC · JPL
808926	2018 VG_{107}	—	November 29, 2013	Mount Lemmon	Mount Lemmon Survey	EOS	1.4 km	MPC · JPL
808927	2018 VM_{110}	—	November 17, 2009	Mount Lemmon	Mount Lemmon Survey	NEM	1.7 km	MPC · JPL
808928	2018 VC_{111}	—	November 8, 2018	Haleakala	Pan-STARRS 2	·	1.3 km	MPC · JPL
808929	2018 VU_{112}	—	November 5, 2018	Mount Lemmon	Mount Lemmon Survey	·	1.7 km	MPC · JPL
808930	2018 VJ_{113}	—	April 19, 2015	Cerro Tololo	DECam	·	1.6 km	MPC · JPL
808931	2018 VQ_{113}	—	November 7, 2018	Mount Lemmon	Mount Lemmon Survey	EUP	2.7 km	MPC · JPL
808932	2018 VZ_{113}	—	November 9, 2018	Haleakala	Pan-STARRS 2	·	1.5 km	MPC · JPL
808933	2018 VP_{114}	—	November 6, 2018	Haleakala	Pan-STARRS 2	·	1.3 km	MPC · JPL
808934	2018 VV_{115}	—	April 19, 2015	Cerro Tololo	DECam	·	1.3 km	MPC · JPL
808935	2018 VB_{117}	—	November 13, 2012	Catalina	CSS	THB	2.1 km	MPC · JPL
808936	2018 VG_{118}	—	November 9, 2018	Mount Lemmon	Mount Lemmon Survey	·	1.8 km	MPC · JPL
808937	2018 VK_{119}	—	April 2, 2016	Haleakala	Pan-STARRS 1	·	1.4 km	MPC · JPL
808938	2018 VE_{120}	—	November 9, 2018	Haleakala	Pan-STARRS 2	·	1.4 km	MPC · JPL
808939	2018 VL_{122}	—	November 6, 2018	Haleakala	Pan-STARRS 2	·	1.6 km	MPC · JPL
808940	2018 VC_{123}	—	November 12, 2018	Haleakala	Pan-STARRS 2	·	1.8 km	MPC · JPL
808941	2018 VH_{123}	—	November 9, 2018	Mount Lemmon	Mount Lemmon Survey	·	2.2 km	MPC · JPL
808942	2018 VN_{123}	—	November 9, 2018	Mount Lemmon	Mount Lemmon Survey	VER	2.0 km	MPC · JPL
808943	2018 VQ_{123}	—	November 6, 2018	Haleakala	Pan-STARRS 2	·	1.7 km	MPC · JPL
808944	2018 VW_{124}	—	November 9, 2018	Mount Lemmon	Mount Lemmon Survey	EUN	820 m	MPC · JPL
808945	2018 VF_{125}	—	May 1, 2016	Cerro Tololo	DECam	HOF	1.9 km	MPC · JPL
808946	2018 VM_{125}	—	November 8, 2018	Mount Lemmon	Mount Lemmon Survey	·	2.2 km	MPC · JPL
808947	2018 VQ_{125}	—	November 9, 2018	Haleakala	Pan-STARRS 2	·	1.5 km	MPC · JPL
808948	2018 VW_{125}	—	May 20, 2015	Cerro Tololo	DECam	·	1.3 km	MPC · JPL
808949	2018 VE_{126}	—	November 8, 2018	Mount Lemmon	Mount Lemmon Survey	·	1.6 km	MPC · JPL
808950	2018 VF_{126}	—	November 5, 2018	Haleakala	Pan-STARRS 2	·	1.7 km	MPC · JPL
808951	2018 VG_{126}	—	November 5, 2018	Mount Lemmon	Mount Lemmon Survey	·	1.4 km	MPC · JPL
808952	2018 VS_{126}	—	November 9, 2018	Haleakala	Pan-STARRS 2	·	1.9 km	MPC · JPL
808953	2018 VD_{127}	—	November 2, 2018	Haleakala	Pan-STARRS 2	·	1.9 km	MPC · JPL
808954	2018 VQ_{128}	—	November 14, 2018	Haleakala	Pan-STARRS 2	·	1.8 km	MPC · JPL
808955	2018 VP_{131}	—	November 3, 2018	Mount Lemmon	Mount Lemmon Survey	·	2.2 km	MPC · JPL
808956	2018 VV_{131}	—	November 11, 2018	Mount Lemmon	Mount Lemmon Survey	·	1.2 km	MPC · JPL
808957	2018 VD_{137}	—	November 9, 2018	Haleakala	Pan-STARRS 2	·	1.3 km	MPC · JPL
808958	2018 VT_{137}	—	November 2, 2018	Mount Lemmon	Mount Lemmon Survey	·	1.3 km	MPC · JPL
808959	2018 VA_{138}	—	November 10, 2018	Haleakala	Pan-STARRS 2	·	1.5 km	MPC · JPL
808960	2018 VL_{139}	—	November 9, 2018	Mount Lemmon	Mount Lemmon Survey	EUN	900 m	MPC · JPL
808961	2018 VT_{139}	—	November 2, 2018	Mount Lemmon	Mount Lemmon Survey	·	1.8 km	MPC · JPL
808962	2018 VA_{140}	—	November 2, 2018	Mount Lemmon	Mount Lemmon Survey	·	1.7 km	MPC · JPL
808963	2018 VT_{140}	—	January 23, 2015	Haleakala	Pan-STARRS 1	EOS	1.4 km	MPC · JPL
808964	2018 VL_{141}	—	November 1, 2018	Haleakala	Pan-STARRS 2	·	1.3 km	MPC · JPL
808965	2018 VJ_{142}	—	November 20, 2014	Mount Lemmon	Mount Lemmon Survey	WIT	780 m	MPC · JPL
808966	2018 VT_{142}	—	November 10, 2018	Haleakala	Pan-STARRS 2	EUN	760 m	MPC · JPL
808967	2018 VH_{143}	—	November 10, 2018	Mount Lemmon	Mount Lemmon Survey	·	1.5 km	MPC · JPL
808968	2018 VJ_{143}	—	November 1, 2018	Mount Lemmon	Mount Lemmon Survey	THB	2.2 km	MPC · JPL
808969	2018 VQ_{143}	—	January 18, 2015	Haleakala	Pan-STARRS 1	·	1.4 km	MPC · JPL
808970	2018 VZ_{143}	—	November 2, 2018	Mount Lemmon	Mount Lemmon Survey	·	1.3 km	MPC · JPL
808971	2018 VN_{144}	—	November 5, 2018	Haleakala	Pan-STARRS 2	EOS	1.4 km	MPC · JPL
808972	2018 VD_{145}	—	April 18, 2015	Cerro Tololo	DECam	·	1.4 km	MPC · JPL
808973	2018 VE_{145}	—	November 12, 2018	Haleakala	Pan-STARRS 2	·	1.3 km	MPC · JPL
808974	2018 VU_{145}	—	November 3, 2018	Mount Lemmon	Mount Lemmon Survey	EOS	1.3 km	MPC · JPL
808975	2018 VZ_{145}	—	November 7, 2018	Mount Lemmon	Mount Lemmon Survey	·	1.0 km	MPC · JPL
808976	2018 VE_{146}	—	November 9, 2018	Haleakala	Pan-STARRS 2	·	1.8 km	MPC · JPL
808977	2018 VM_{146}	—	November 9, 2018	Haleakala	Pan-STARRS 2	·	1.4 km	MPC · JPL
808978	2018 VO_{146}	—	November 9, 2018	Haleakala	Pan-STARRS 2	·	1.4 km	MPC · JPL
808979	2018 VU_{146}	—	November 9, 2018	Mount Lemmon	Mount Lemmon Survey	EOS	1.3 km	MPC · JPL
808980	2018 VD_{151}	—	November 5, 2018	Haleakala	Pan-STARRS 2	HNS	900 m	MPC · JPL
808981	2018 VK_{151}	—	November 6, 2018	Haleakala	Pan-STARRS 2	·	1.2 km	MPC · JPL
808982	2018 VL_{151}	—	November 7, 2018	Haleakala	Pan-STARRS 2	·	1.7 km	MPC · JPL
808983	2018 VJ_{152}	—	November 6, 2018	Mount Lemmon	Mount Lemmon Survey	T_{j} (2.99)	1.9 km	MPC · JPL
808984	2018 VR_{152}	—	November 7, 2018	Mount Lemmon	Mount Lemmon Survey	·	1.6 km	MPC · JPL
808985	2018 VO_{153}	—	November 10, 2018	Mount Lemmon	Mount Lemmon Survey	·	1.3 km	MPC · JPL
808986	2018 VV_{153}	—	November 8, 2018	Mount Lemmon	Mount Lemmon Survey	HOF	1.7 km	MPC · JPL
808987	2018 VP_{154}	—	November 14, 2018	Haleakala	Pan-STARRS 2	·	2.5 km	MPC · JPL
808988	2018 VX_{154}	—	November 6, 2018	Haleakala	Pan-STARRS 2	GEF	950 m	MPC · JPL
808989	2018 VB_{155}	—	June 22, 2009	Mount Lemmon	Mount Lemmon Survey	·	1.1 km	MPC · JPL
808990	2018 VJ_{155}	—	November 7, 2018	Mount Lemmon	Mount Lemmon Survey	·	1.6 km	MPC · JPL
808991	2018 VR_{155}	—	November 6, 2018	Haleakala	Pan-STARRS 2	·	1.5 km	MPC · JPL
808992	2018 VF_{156}	—	November 3, 2018	Mount Lemmon	Mount Lemmon Survey	LIX	2.6 km	MPC · JPL
808993	2018 VT_{156}	—	November 1, 2018	Haleakala	Pan-STARRS 2	·	1.1 km	MPC · JPL
808994	2018 VA_{159}	—	November 2, 2018	Mount Lemmon	Mount Lemmon Survey	·	1.4 km	MPC · JPL
808995	2018 VO_{159}	—	August 8, 2013	Kitt Peak	Spacewatch	·	1.4 km	MPC · JPL
808996	2018 VB_{160}	—	November 7, 2018	Haleakala	Pan-STARRS 2	·	1.7 km	MPC · JPL
808997	2018 VX_{160}	—	November 6, 2018	Haleakala	Pan-STARRS 2	·	1.5 km	MPC · JPL
808998	2018 VZ_{160}	—	November 1, 2018	Haleakala	Pan-STARRS 2	HOF	2.0 km	MPC · JPL
808999	2018 VO_{161}	—	November 8, 2018	Haleakala	Pan-STARRS 2	HOF	1.7 km	MPC · JPL
809000	2018 VR_{161}	—	November 5, 2018	Haleakala	Pan-STARRS 2	·	1.3 km	MPC · JPL

back to top

== Meaning of names ==
As minor planet discoveries are confirmed, they are given a permanent number by the IAU's Minor Planet Center (MPC), and the discoverers can then submit names for them, following the IAU's naming conventions. The list below concerns those minor planets in the specified number-range that have received names, and explains the meanings of those names.

Official naming citations of newly named small Solar System bodies are approved and published in a bulletin by IAU's Working Group for Small Bodies Nomenclature (WGSBN). Before May 2021, citations were published in MPC's Minor Planet Circulars for many decades. Recent citations can also be found on the JPL Small-Body Database (SBDB). Until his death in 2016, German astronomer Lutz D. Schmadel compiled these citations into the Dictionary of Minor Planet Names (DMP) and regularly updated the collection.

Based on Paul Herget's The Names of the Minor Planets, Schmadel also researched the unclear origin of numerous asteroids, most of which had been named prior to World War II. This article incorporates text from this source, which is in the public domain: SBDB New namings may only be added to this list below after official publication as the preannouncement of names is condemned. The WGSBN publishes a comprehensive guideline for the naming rules of non-cometary small Solar System bodies.

Named minor planet	Provisional	This minor planet was named for...	Ref · Catalog
808162 Andrejsērglis	2017 UX_{95}	Andrejs Ērglis, Latvian cardiologist.	IAU · 808162
808811 Tarczaygyörgy	2018 TY_{29}	György Tarczay, a Hungarian chemist and full professor at the Eötvös Loránd University.	IAU · 808811
