= List of minor planets: 805001–806000 =

The following is a partial list of minor planets, running from minor-planet number 805001 through 806000, inclusive. The primary data for this and other partial lists is based on JPL's "Small-Body Orbital Elements" and data available from the Minor Planet Center. Critical list information is also provided by the MPC, unless otherwise specified from Lowell Observatory. A detailed description of the table's columns and additional sources are given on the main page including a complete list of every page in this series, and a statistical break-up on the dynamical classification of minor planets.

Also see the summary list of all named bodies in numerical and alphabetical order, and the corresponding naming citations for the number range of this particular list. New namings may only be added to this list after official publication, as the preannouncement of names is condemned by the Working Group for Small Bodies Nomenclature of the International Astronomical Union.

Near-Earth obj.	MBA (inner)	MBA (outer)	Centaur
Mars-crosser	MBA (middle)	Jupiter trojan	Trans-Neptunian obj.
Unclassified

== 805001–805100 ==
Designation			Discovery			Properties		Ref
Permanent	Provisional	Named after	Date	Site	Discoverer(s)	Category	Diam.	Ref
805001	2016 CK_{148}	—	January 30, 2016	Mount Lemmon	Mount Lemmon Survey	·	1.5 km	MPC · JPL
805002	2016 CT_{148}	—	July 16, 2004	Cerro Tololo	Deep Ecliptic Survey	·	1.1 km	MPC · JPL
805003	2016 CL_{149}	—	March 12, 2011	Mount Lemmon	Mount Lemmon Survey	·	2.6 km	MPC · JPL
805004	2016 CN_{151}	—	January 3, 2016	Haleakala	Pan-STARRS 1	·	1.6 km	MPC · JPL
805005	2016 CG_{153}	—	January 4, 2016	Haleakala	Pan-STARRS 1	·	930 m	MPC · JPL
805006	2016 CP_{154}	—	February 9, 2016	Mount Lemmon	Mount Lemmon Survey	·	1.3 km	MPC · JPL
805007	2016 CL_{158}	—	January 18, 2016	Mount Lemmon	Mount Lemmon Survey	·	790 m	MPC · JPL
805008	2016 CJ_{160}	—	January 17, 2016	Haleakala	Pan-STARRS 1	·	1.2 km	MPC · JPL
805009	2016 CS_{170}	—	February 9, 2016	Haleakala	Pan-STARRS 1	·	1.3 km	MPC · JPL
805010	2016 CL_{171}	—	January 7, 2016	Haleakala	Pan-STARRS 1	·	1.0 km	MPC · JPL
805011	2016 CU_{171}	—	January 19, 2012	Haleakala	Pan-STARRS 1	·	940 m	MPC · JPL
805012	2016 CP_{172}	—	January 30, 2016	Mount Lemmon	Mount Lemmon Survey	·	890 m	MPC · JPL
805013	2016 CZ_{176}	—	January 9, 2016	Haleakala	Pan-STARRS 1	·	1.3 km	MPC · JPL
805014	2016 CU_{177}	—	January 9, 2016	Haleakala	Pan-STARRS 1	EUN	820 m	MPC · JPL
805015	2016 CZ_{177}	—	December 9, 2015	Haleakala	Pan-STARRS 1	·	1.1 km	MPC · JPL
805016	2016 CY_{178}	—	December 9, 2015	Haleakala	Pan-STARRS 1	·	2.0 km	MPC · JPL
805017	2016 CF_{180}	—	February 9, 2016	Haleakala	Pan-STARRS 1	NAE	1.3 km	MPC · JPL
805018	2016 CN_{180}	—	February 9, 2016	Haleakala	Pan-STARRS 1	·	780 m	MPC · JPL
805019	2016 CV_{180}	—	February 9, 2016	Haleakala	Pan-STARRS 1	·	1.1 km	MPC · JPL
805020	2016 CD_{182}	—	July 7, 2013	Siding Spring	SSS	·	1.5 km	MPC · JPL
805021	2016 CK_{182}	—	January 4, 2016	Haleakala	Pan-STARRS 1	EOS	1.1 km	MPC · JPL
805022	2016 CN_{185}	—	December 12, 2015	Haleakala	Pan-STARRS 1	JUN	810 m	MPC · JPL
805023	2016 CF_{186}	—	January 11, 2016	Haleakala	Pan-STARRS 1	·	1.2 km	MPC · JPL
805024	2016 CO_{187}	—	February 9, 2016	Haleakala	Pan-STARRS 1	·	2.3 km	MPC · JPL
805025	2016 CE_{188}	—	August 28, 2013	Mount Lemmon	Mount Lemmon Survey	·	2.0 km	MPC · JPL
805026	2016 CS_{190}	—	January 3, 2016	Haleakala	Pan-STARRS 1	MIS	1.5 km	MPC · JPL
805027	2016 CG_{197}	—	September 19, 2014	Haleakala	Pan-STARRS 1	·	1.2 km	MPC · JPL
805028	2016 CN_{198}	—	March 28, 2012	Haleakala	Pan-STARRS 1	·	1.2 km	MPC · JPL
805029	2016 CR_{200}	—	February 9, 2016	Haleakala	Pan-STARRS 1	·	1.2 km	MPC · JPL
805030	2016 CU_{202}	—	February 9, 2016	Haleakala	Pan-STARRS 1	·	2.4 km	MPC · JPL
805031	2016 CW_{203}	—	January 8, 2016	Haleakala	Pan-STARRS 1	·	1.3 km	MPC · JPL
805032	2016 CC_{210}	—	April 13, 2012	Haleakala	Pan-STARRS 1	MIS	1.7 km	MPC · JPL
805033	2016 CW_{211}	—	January 13, 2016	Haleakala	Pan-STARRS 1	·	1.4 km	MPC · JPL
805034	2016 CL_{213}	—	February 9, 2016	Haleakala	Pan-STARRS 1	·	2.1 km	MPC · JPL
805035	2016 CP_{213}	—	March 17, 2012	Kitt Peak	Spacewatch	·	1.1 km	MPC · JPL
805036	2016 CX_{213}	—	September 3, 2008	Kitt Peak	Spacewatch	·	1.7 km	MPC · JPL
805037	2016 CA_{216}	—	February 9, 2016	Haleakala	Pan-STARRS 1	·	1.6 km	MPC · JPL
805038	2016 CT_{216}	—	February 9, 2016	Haleakala	Pan-STARRS 1	EOS	1.1 km	MPC · JPL
805039	2016 CG_{218}	—	May 25, 2006	Mauna Kea	P. A. Wiegert	THM	1.7 km	MPC · JPL
805040	2016 CF_{219}	—	January 4, 2016	Haleakala	Pan-STARRS 1	·	1.2 km	MPC · JPL
805041	2016 CS_{220}	—	February 9, 2016	Haleakala	Pan-STARRS 1	·	2.2 km	MPC · JPL
805042	2016 CB_{222}	—	July 14, 2013	Haleakala	Pan-STARRS 1	·	1.0 km	MPC · JPL
805043	2016 CM_{224}	—	February 10, 2016	Haleakala	Pan-STARRS 1	·	1.3 km	MPC · JPL
805044	2016 CB_{226}	—	February 10, 2016	Haleakala	Pan-STARRS 1	·	940 m	MPC · JPL
805045	2016 CF_{227}	—	April 27, 2012	Haleakala	Pan-STARRS 1	·	1.2 km	MPC · JPL
805046	2016 CL_{229}	—	April 24, 2008	Kitt Peak	Spacewatch	·	1.2 km	MPC · JPL
805047	2016 CE_{230}	—	November 8, 2010	Mount Lemmon	Mount Lemmon Survey	·	1.1 km	MPC · JPL
805048	2016 CN_{231}	—	January 14, 2016	Haleakala	Pan-STARRS 1	HNS	790 m	MPC · JPL
805049	2016 CS_{232}	—	February 10, 2016	Haleakala	Pan-STARRS 1	·	1.2 km	MPC · JPL
805050	2016 CC_{234}	—	February 10, 2016	Haleakala	Pan-STARRS 1	·	2.7 km	MPC · JPL
805051	2016 CO_{234}	—	February 10, 2016	Haleakala	Pan-STARRS 1	·	2.2 km	MPC · JPL
805052	2016 CF_{235}	—	November 27, 2014	Kitt Peak	Spacewatch	·	1.7 km	MPC · JPL
805053	2016 CO_{235}	—	February 10, 2016	Haleakala	Pan-STARRS 1	·	1.2 km	MPC · JPL
805054	2016 CZ_{236}	—	February 10, 2016	Haleakala	Pan-STARRS 1	·	2.1 km	MPC · JPL
805055	2016 CP_{237}	—	November 22, 2014	Haleakala	Pan-STARRS 1	·	960 m	MPC · JPL
805056	2016 CS_{237}	—	February 10, 2016	Haleakala	Pan-STARRS 1	EUN	860 m	MPC · JPL
805057	2016 CM_{241}	—	February 21, 2012	Kitt Peak	Spacewatch	·	1.7 km	MPC · JPL
805058	2016 CO_{243}	—	February 10, 2016	Haleakala	Pan-STARRS 1	·	1.1 km	MPC · JPL
805059	2016 CK_{245}	—	February 10, 2016	Haleakala	Pan-STARRS 1	·	2.2 km	MPC · JPL
805060	2016 CV_{250}	—	May 15, 2008	Mount Lemmon	Mount Lemmon Survey	EUN	830 m	MPC · JPL
805061	2016 CB_{251}	—	February 3, 2012	Mount Lemmon	Mount Lemmon Survey	MAR	750 m	MPC · JPL
805062	2016 CH_{251}	—	March 16, 2012	Haleakala	Pan-STARRS 1	·	1.4 km	MPC · JPL
805063	2016 CN_{251}	—	March 30, 2012	Mount Lemmon	Mount Lemmon Survey	·	1.2 km	MPC · JPL
805064	2016 CS_{252}	—	February 5, 2016	Haleakala	Pan-STARRS 1	·	920 m	MPC · JPL
805065	2016 CS_{253}	—	October 19, 2010	Mount Lemmon	Mount Lemmon Survey	ADE	1.3 km	MPC · JPL
805066	2016 CU_{253}	—	February 10, 2016	Haleakala	Pan-STARRS 1	EUN	780 m	MPC · JPL
805067	2016 CC_{256}	—	February 3, 2016	Haleakala	Pan-STARRS 1	·	1.2 km	MPC · JPL
805068	2016 CB_{259}	—	February 11, 2016	Haleakala	Pan-STARRS 1	·	2.0 km	MPC · JPL
805069	2016 CT_{263}	—	March 29, 2012	Kitt Peak	Spacewatch	·	1.2 km	MPC · JPL
805070	2016 CS_{264}	—	January 13, 2016	Haleakala	Pan-STARRS 1	·	1.1 km	MPC · JPL
805071	2016 CX_{264}	—	February 11, 2016	Haleakala	Pan-STARRS 1	AMO	410 m	MPC · JPL
805072	2016 CA_{269}	—	February 21, 2007	Mount Lemmon	Mount Lemmon Survey	·	1.3 km	MPC · JPL
805073	2016 CR_{269}	—	February 3, 2016	Haleakala	Pan-STARRS 1	critical	1.1 km	MPC · JPL
805074	2016 CC_{270}	—	February 4, 2016	Haleakala	Pan-STARRS 1	·	1.1 km	MPC · JPL
805075	2016 CE_{270}	—	February 4, 2016	Haleakala	Pan-STARRS 1	·	1.2 km	MPC · JPL
805076	2016 CA_{271}	—	February 5, 2016	Haleakala	Pan-STARRS 1	HNS	730 m	MPC · JPL
805077	2016 CR_{272}	—	February 6, 2016	Haleakala	Pan-STARRS 1	·	1.3 km	MPC · JPL
805078	2016 CN_{273}	—	February 9, 2016	Haleakala	Pan-STARRS 1	·	1.3 km	MPC · JPL
805079	2016 CE_{275}	—	February 10, 2016	Haleakala	Pan-STARRS 1	·	1.5 km	MPC · JPL
805080	2016 CU_{277}	—	February 3, 2016	Haleakala	Pan-STARRS 1	HNS	840 m	MPC · JPL
805081	2016 CV_{277}	—	February 3, 2016	Haleakala	Pan-STARRS 1	·	1.1 km	MPC · JPL
805082	2016 CE_{279}	—	February 11, 2016	Haleakala	Pan-STARRS 1	THM	1.7 km	MPC · JPL
805083	2016 CT_{281}	—	April 15, 2012	Haleakala	Pan-STARRS 1	EUN	800 m	MPC · JPL
805084	2016 CO_{284}	—	February 1, 2016	Haleakala	Pan-STARRS 1	·	930 m	MPC · JPL
805085	2016 CZ_{284}	—	February 27, 2012	Haleakala	Pan-STARRS 1	·	980 m	MPC · JPL
805086	2016 CC_{287}	—	February 5, 2016	Haleakala	Pan-STARRS 1	·	2.2 km	MPC · JPL
805087	2016 CH_{290}	—	February 10, 2016	Haleakala	Pan-STARRS 1	HNS	730 m	MPC · JPL
805088	2016 CH_{292}	—	April 18, 2012	Mount Lemmon	Mount Lemmon Survey	EUN	1.0 km	MPC · JPL
805089	2016 CC_{294}	—	September 1, 2013	Mount Lemmon	Mount Lemmon Survey	·	1.3 km	MPC · JPL
805090	2016 CL_{294}	—	February 10, 2016	Haleakala	Pan-STARRS 1	·	1.0 km	MPC · JPL
805091	2016 CE_{295}	—	March 15, 2012	Mount Lemmon	Mount Lemmon Survey	·	1.2 km	MPC · JPL
805092	2016 CD_{296}	—	March 25, 2012	Mount Lemmon	Mount Lemmon Survey	EUN	700 m	MPC · JPL
805093	2016 CG_{296}	—	November 20, 2014	Haleakala	Pan-STARRS 1	·	1.8 km	MPC · JPL
805094	2016 CM_{297}	—	February 3, 2016	Haleakala	Pan-STARRS 1	·	2.4 km	MPC · JPL
805095	2016 CO_{297}	—	October 1, 2014	Haleakala	Pan-STARRS 1	ADE	1.7 km	MPC · JPL
805096	2016 CW_{297}	—	December 11, 2014	Mount Lemmon	Mount Lemmon Survey	·	1.9 km	MPC · JPL
805097	2016 CA_{298}	—	February 28, 2012	Haleakala	Pan-STARRS 1	·	1.2 km	MPC · JPL
805098	2016 CP_{300}	—	February 5, 2016	Haleakala	Pan-STARRS 1	·	960 m	MPC · JPL
805099	2016 CJ_{302}	—	February 5, 2016	Haleakala	Pan-STARRS 1	EUN	850 m	MPC · JPL
805100	2016 CN_{303}	—	August 4, 2013	Haleakala	Pan-STARRS 1	·	1.2 km	MPC · JPL

== 805101–805200 ==
back to top

Designation			Discovery			Properties		Ref
Permanent	Provisional	Named after	Date	Site	Discoverer(s)	Category	Diam.	Ref
805101	2016 CG_{304}	—	February 5, 2016	Haleakala	Pan-STARRS 1	·	1.0 km	MPC · JPL
805102	2016 CC_{305}	—	May 19, 2012	Mount Lemmon	Mount Lemmon Survey	·	1.4 km	MPC · JPL
805103	2016 CN_{305}	—	February 6, 2016	Haleakala	Pan-STARRS 1	·	970 m	MPC · JPL
805104	2016 CW_{305}	—	April 5, 2003	Kitt Peak	Spacewatch	·	1.0 km	MPC · JPL
805105	2016 CS_{307}	—	January 17, 2007	Kitt Peak	Spacewatch	·	1.2 km	MPC · JPL
805106	2016 CP_{309}	—	February 9, 2016	Haleakala	Pan-STARRS 1	·	1.0 km	MPC · JPL
805107	2016 CA_{310}	—	February 27, 2012	Haleakala	Pan-STARRS 1	·	1.0 km	MPC · JPL
805108	2016 CX_{310}	—	February 9, 2016	Haleakala	Pan-STARRS 1	·	2.7 km	MPC · JPL
805109	2016 CB_{311}	—	February 9, 2016	Haleakala	Pan-STARRS 1	·	1.2 km	MPC · JPL
805110	2016 CD_{313}	—	February 10, 2016	Haleakala	Pan-STARRS 1	·	1.4 km	MPC · JPL
805111	2016 CK_{315}	—	October 21, 2014	Mount Lemmon	Mount Lemmon Survey	·	990 m	MPC · JPL
805112	2016 CB_{316}	—	February 11, 2016	Haleakala	Pan-STARRS 1	·	1.0 km	MPC · JPL
805113	2016 CH_{316}	—	January 29, 2011	Mount Lemmon	Mount Lemmon Survey	·	1.4 km	MPC · JPL
805114	2016 CQ_{316}	—	March 29, 2012	Mount Lemmon	Mount Lemmon Survey	·	950 m	MPC · JPL
805115	2016 CY_{317}	—	October 17, 2014	Mount Lemmon	Mount Lemmon Survey	ADE	1.3 km	MPC · JPL
805116	2016 CD_{319}	—	November 9, 2013	Kitt Peak	Spacewatch	526	2.1 km	MPC · JPL
805117	2016 CH_{321}	—	November 14, 2010	Kitt Peak	Spacewatch	·	1.3 km	MPC · JPL
805118	2016 CD_{322}	—	March 29, 2012	Haleakala	Pan-STARRS 1	·	1.0 km	MPC · JPL
805119	2016 CX_{322}	—	February 15, 2016	Haleakala	Pan-STARRS 1	·	1.5 km	MPC · JPL
805120	2016 CO_{323}	—	February 10, 2016	Haleakala	Pan-STARRS 1	·	1.6 km	MPC · JPL
805121	2016 CX_{323}	—	February 9, 2016	Haleakala	Pan-STARRS 1	BAR	680 m	MPC · JPL
805122	2016 CD_{324}	—	February 7, 2016	Mount Lemmon	Mount Lemmon Survey	·	2.5 km	MPC · JPL
805123	2016 CH_{324}	—	February 10, 2016	Haleakala	Pan-STARRS 1	TIN	930 m	MPC · JPL
805124	2016 CR_{324}	—	February 10, 2016	Haleakala	Pan-STARRS 1	·	1.2 km	MPC · JPL
805125	2016 CU_{324}	—	February 11, 2016	Haleakala	Pan-STARRS 1	·	1.4 km	MPC · JPL
805126	2016 CA_{328}	—	February 4, 2016	Haleakala	Pan-STARRS 1	·	2.1 km	MPC · JPL
805127	2016 CG_{331}	—	February 10, 2016	Haleakala	Pan-STARRS 1	·	1.0 km	MPC · JPL
805128	2016 CH_{331}	—	September 23, 2008	Kitt Peak	Spacewatch	·	2.6 km	MPC · JPL
805129	2016 CJ_{331}	—	February 11, 2016	Haleakala	Pan-STARRS 1	·	1.2 km	MPC · JPL
805130	2016 CW_{331}	—	April 1, 2017	Haleakala	Pan-STARRS 1	·	1.7 km	MPC · JPL
805131	2016 CX_{331}	—	February 10, 2016	Haleakala	Pan-STARRS 1	·	1.3 km	MPC · JPL
805132	2016 CB_{332}	—	February 5, 2016	Haleakala	Pan-STARRS 1	·	1.2 km	MPC · JPL
805133	2016 CE_{333}	—	January 20, 2016	Mount Lemmon	Mount Lemmon Survey	JUN	690 m	MPC · JPL
805134	2016 CC_{334}	—	February 5, 2016	Haleakala	Pan-STARRS 1	·	1.4 km	MPC · JPL
805135	2016 CF_{334}	—	February 5, 2016	Haleakala	Pan-STARRS 1	·	1.1 km	MPC · JPL
805136	2016 CM_{334}	—	February 10, 2016	Haleakala	Pan-STARRS 1	·	1.3 km	MPC · JPL
805137	2016 CG_{336}	—	February 2, 2016	Haleakala	Pan-STARRS 1	·	850 m	MPC · JPL
805138	2016 CK_{336}	—	February 6, 2016	Haleakala	Pan-STARRS 1	·	1.0 km	MPC · JPL
805139	2016 CN_{338}	—	February 5, 2016	Haleakala	Pan-STARRS 1	·	1.1 km	MPC · JPL
805140	2016 CU_{338}	—	February 9, 2016	Haleakala	Pan-STARRS 1	GEF	850 m	MPC · JPL
805141	2016 CV_{338}	—	February 5, 2016	Haleakala	Pan-STARRS 1	·	1.2 km	MPC · JPL
805142	2016 CU_{339}	—	February 10, 2016	Haleakala	Pan-STARRS 1	·	1.1 km	MPC · JPL
805143	2016 CB_{340}	—	February 11, 2016	Haleakala	Pan-STARRS 1	·	1.2 km	MPC · JPL
805144	2016 CQ_{340}	—	February 9, 2016	Mount Lemmon	Mount Lemmon Survey	·	2.1 km	MPC · JPL
805145	2016 CV_{340}	—	February 9, 2016	Haleakala	Pan-STARRS 1	·	1.9 km	MPC · JPL
805146	2016 CL_{341}	—	February 10, 2016	Haleakala	Pan-STARRS 1	EOS	1.1 km	MPC · JPL
805147	2016 CU_{341}	—	February 4, 2016	Haleakala	Pan-STARRS 1	TIR	2.2 km	MPC · JPL
805148	2016 CW_{341}	—	February 6, 2016	Haleakala	Pan-STARRS 1	·	1.0 km	MPC · JPL
805149	2016 CA_{342}	—	February 3, 2016	Haleakala	Pan-STARRS 1	·	1.3 km	MPC · JPL
805150	2016 CH_{342}	—	February 14, 2016	Haleakala	Pan-STARRS 1	·	1.4 km	MPC · JPL
805151	2016 CR_{342}	—	February 5, 2016	Haleakala	Pan-STARRS 1	·	1.5 km	MPC · JPL
805152	2016 CU_{342}	—	February 10, 2016	Haleakala	Pan-STARRS 1	·	1.1 km	MPC · JPL
805153	2016 CW_{342}	—	February 3, 2016	Haleakala	Pan-STARRS 1	HNS	770 m	MPC · JPL
805154	2016 CB_{343}	—	February 10, 2016	Haleakala	Pan-STARRS 1	·	920 m	MPC · JPL
805155	2016 CE_{343}	—	February 10, 2016	Haleakala	Pan-STARRS 1	ELF	2.3 km	MPC · JPL
805156	2016 CU_{343}	—	February 5, 2016	Haleakala	Pan-STARRS 1	·	2.5 km	MPC · JPL
805157	2016 CY_{343}	—	February 5, 2016	Haleakala	Pan-STARRS 1	·	620 m	MPC · JPL
805158	2016 CC_{347}	—	February 10, 2016	Haleakala	Pan-STARRS 1	·	950 m	MPC · JPL
805159	2016 CD_{347}	—	February 10, 2016	Haleakala	Pan-STARRS 1	GEF	870 m	MPC · JPL
805160	2016 CA_{350}	—	February 5, 2016	Haleakala	Pan-STARRS 1	·	2.0 km	MPC · JPL
805161	2016 CP_{350}	—	February 11, 2016	Haleakala	Pan-STARRS 1	·	1.0 km	MPC · JPL
805162	2016 CD_{351}	—	February 5, 2016	Haleakala	Pan-STARRS 1	·	2.1 km	MPC · JPL
805163	2016 CF_{351}	—	February 10, 2016	Haleakala	Pan-STARRS 1	·	2.7 km	MPC · JPL
805164	2016 CM_{351}	—	February 8, 2016	Mount Lemmon	Mount Lemmon Survey	HYG	1.7 km	MPC · JPL
805165	2016 CZ_{351}	—	February 1, 2016	Haleakala	Pan-STARRS 1	SYL	3.1 km	MPC · JPL
805166	2016 CE_{353}	—	February 9, 2016	Mount Lemmon	Mount Lemmon Survey	·	1.2 km	MPC · JPL
805167	2016 CR_{355}	—	February 10, 2016	Mount Lemmon	Mount Lemmon Survey	·	1.0 km	MPC · JPL
805168	2016 CA_{357}	—	February 3, 2016	Haleakala	Pan-STARRS 1	·	2.0 km	MPC · JPL
805169	2016 CF_{358}	—	February 11, 2016	Mount Lemmon	Mount Lemmon Survey	·	1.7 km	MPC · JPL
805170	2016 CS_{358}	—	February 11, 2016	Haleakala	Pan-STARRS 1	KOR	820 m	MPC · JPL
805171	2016 CV_{358}	—	February 8, 2016	Mount Lemmon	Mount Lemmon Survey	KOR	880 m	MPC · JPL
805172	2016 CB_{361}	—	February 8, 2016	Mount Lemmon	Mount Lemmon Survey	·	1.1 km	MPC · JPL
805173	2016 CZ_{364}	—	February 8, 2011	Mount Lemmon	Mount Lemmon Survey	·	1.4 km	MPC · JPL
805174	2016 CB_{365}	—	February 11, 2016	Haleakala	Pan-STARRS 1	·	930 m	MPC · JPL
805175	2016 CE_{365}	—	May 24, 2001	Cerro Tololo	Deep Ecliptic Survey	THM	1.8 km	MPC · JPL
805176	2016 CN_{366}	—	February 5, 2016	Haleakala	Pan-STARRS 1	EOS	1.4 km	MPC · JPL
805177	2016 CE_{368}	—	February 3, 2016	Haleakala	Pan-STARRS 1	·	1.3 km	MPC · JPL
805178	2016 CG_{370}	—	February 3, 2016	Haleakala	Pan-STARRS 1	·	1.5 km	MPC · JPL
805179	2016 CX_{370}	—	February 12, 2016	Mount Lemmon	Mount Lemmon Survey	·	1.4 km	MPC · JPL
805180	2016 CY_{371}	—	February 1, 2016	Haleakala	Pan-STARRS 1	·	1.0 km	MPC · JPL
805181	2016 CD_{372}	—	February 11, 2016	Haleakala	Pan-STARRS 1	·	1.1 km	MPC · JPL
805182	2016 CX_{372}	—	February 3, 2016	Haleakala	Pan-STARRS 1	·	1.1 km	MPC · JPL
805183	2016 CY_{372}	—	February 6, 2016	Mount Lemmon	Mount Lemmon Survey	·	1.1 km	MPC · JPL
805184	2016 CZ_{372}	—	February 10, 2016	Haleakala	Pan-STARRS 1	·	1.3 km	MPC · JPL
805185	2016 CD_{373}	—	February 10, 2016	Haleakala	Pan-STARRS 1	·	980 m	MPC · JPL
805186	2016 CH_{373}	—	February 10, 2016	Mount Lemmon	Mount Lemmon Survey	·	990 m	MPC · JPL
805187	2016 CR_{373}	—	February 3, 2016	Haleakala	Pan-STARRS 1	·	1.1 km	MPC · JPL
805188	2016 CA_{374}	—	February 10, 2016	Haleakala	Pan-STARRS 1	(32418)	1.3 km	MPC · JPL
805189	2016 CG_{374}	—	February 9, 2016	Haleakala	Pan-STARRS 1	·	1.2 km	MPC · JPL
805190	2016 CY_{374}	—	February 5, 2016	Haleakala	Pan-STARRS 1	·	930 m	MPC · JPL
805191	2016 CZ_{374}	—	February 10, 2016	Haleakala	Pan-STARRS 1	·	910 m	MPC · JPL
805192	2016 CE_{375}	—	February 10, 2016	Haleakala	Pan-STARRS 1	L4	7.4 km	MPC · JPL
805193	2016 CL_{375}	—	February 10, 2016	Haleakala	Pan-STARRS 1	EUN	710 m	MPC · JPL
805194	2016 CP_{375}	—	August 28, 2013	Mount Lemmon	Mount Lemmon Survey	·	1.7 km	MPC · JPL
805195	2016 CR_{375}	—	February 10, 2016	Haleakala	Pan-STARRS 1	·	1.1 km	MPC · JPL
805196	2016 CU_{375}	—	July 15, 2013	Haleakala	Pan-STARRS 1	·	1.0 km	MPC · JPL
805197	2016 CW_{375}	—	February 6, 2016	Haleakala	Pan-STARRS 1	·	990 m	MPC · JPL
805198	2016 CW_{376}	—	February 11, 2016	Haleakala	Pan-STARRS 1	EUN	810 m	MPC · JPL
805199	2016 CB_{377}	—	February 10, 2016	Haleakala	Pan-STARRS 1	·	1.2 km	MPC · JPL
805200	2016 CX_{377}	—	February 8, 2016	Mount Lemmon	Mount Lemmon Survey	·	1.3 km	MPC · JPL

== 805201–805300 ==
back to top

Designation			Discovery			Properties		Ref
Permanent	Provisional	Named after	Date	Site	Discoverer(s)	Category	Diam.	Ref
805201	2016 CY_{377}	—	February 9, 2016	Mount Lemmon	Mount Lemmon Survey	·	990 m	MPC · JPL
805202	2016 CP_{378}	—	February 9, 2016	Haleakala	Pan-STARRS 1	ADE	1.3 km	MPC · JPL
805203	2016 CW_{379}	—	February 12, 2016	Mount Lemmon	Mount Lemmon Survey	critical	1.1 km	MPC · JPL
805204	2016 CP_{380}	—	February 5, 2016	Haleakala	Pan-STARRS 1	·	1.4 km	MPC · JPL
805205	2016 CB_{381}	—	February 9, 2016	Haleakala	Pan-STARRS 1	·	2.3 km	MPC · JPL
805206	2016 CB_{382}	—	February 5, 2016	Haleakala	Pan-STARRS 1	·	2.6 km	MPC · JPL
805207	2016 CL_{382}	—	February 1, 2016	Haleakala	Pan-STARRS 1	·	1.5 km	MPC · JPL
805208	2016 CB_{383}	—	February 1, 2016	Haleakala	Pan-STARRS 1	KOR	840 m	MPC · JPL
805209	2016 CG_{383}	—	February 12, 2016	Haleakala	Pan-STARRS 1	BRA	1.2 km	MPC · JPL
805210	2016 CL_{383}	—	February 5, 2016	Haleakala	Pan-STARRS 1	·	1.7 km	MPC · JPL
805211	2016 CX_{386}	—	February 3, 2016	Haleakala	Pan-STARRS 1	·	1.0 km	MPC · JPL
805212 Junkes	2016 CA_{389}	Junkes	February 29, 2012	Mount Graham	K. Černis, R. P. Boyle	HNS	740 m	MPC · JPL
805213	2016 CX_{389}	—	April 15, 2012	Haleakala	Pan-STARRS 1	·	1.0 km	MPC · JPL
805214	2016 CM_{390}	—	January 11, 2016	Haleakala	Pan-STARRS 1	·	1.6 km	MPC · JPL
805215	2016 CZ_{390}	—	February 8, 2016	Mount Lemmon	Mount Lemmon Survey	·	970 m	MPC · JPL
805216	2016 CD_{391}	—	February 11, 2016	Haleakala	Pan-STARRS 1	MAR	660 m	MPC · JPL
805217	2016 CA_{392}	—	September 23, 2008	Mount Lemmon	Mount Lemmon Survey	·	2.4 km	MPC · JPL
805218	2016 CH_{393}	—	September 10, 2013	Haleakala	Pan-STARRS 1	·	2.7 km	MPC · JPL
805219	2016 CQ_{394}	—	February 6, 2016	Haleakala	Pan-STARRS 1	MAR	760 m	MPC · JPL
805220	2016 CC_{397}	—	February 12, 2016	Haleakala	Pan-STARRS 1	·	1.3 km	MPC · JPL
805221	2016 CS_{398}	—	February 10, 2016	Haleakala	Pan-STARRS 1	·	1.3 km	MPC · JPL
805222	2016 CV_{398}	—	January 14, 2016	Haleakala	Pan-STARRS 1	3:2	3.7 km	MPC · JPL
805223	2016 CZ_{398}	—	February 5, 2016	Haleakala	Pan-STARRS 1	·	1.7 km	MPC · JPL
805224	2016 CJ_{401}	—	February 5, 2016	Haleakala	Pan-STARRS 1	·	1.4 km	MPC · JPL
805225	2016 CF_{402}	—	February 3, 2016	Haleakala	Pan-STARRS 1	·	1.3 km	MPC · JPL
805226	2016 CV_{402}	—	October 26, 2014	Mount Lemmon	Mount Lemmon Survey	·	1.5 km	MPC · JPL
805227	2016 CO_{404}	—	February 10, 2016	Haleakala	Pan-STARRS 1	EUN	990 m	MPC · JPL
805228	2016 CY_{404}	—	February 5, 2016	Haleakala	Pan-STARRS 1	·	1.3 km	MPC · JPL
805229	2016 CE_{405}	—	February 11, 2016	Haleakala	Pan-STARRS 1	·	1.4 km	MPC · JPL
805230	2016 CH_{405}	—	February 14, 2016	Haleakala	Pan-STARRS 1	MAR	770 m	MPC · JPL
805231	2016 CG_{409}	—	February 9, 2016	Haleakala	Pan-STARRS 1	·	2.3 km	MPC · JPL
805232	2016 CF_{411}	—	February 5, 2016	Haleakala	Pan-STARRS 1	EOS	1.0 km	MPC · JPL
805233	2016 CN_{411}	—	February 6, 2016	Haleakala	Pan-STARRS 1	·	1.7 km	MPC · JPL
805234	2016 CO_{412}	—	February 5, 2016	Haleakala	Pan-STARRS 1	·	1.2 km	MPC · JPL
805235	2016 CG_{413}	—	February 5, 2016	Haleakala	Pan-STARRS 1	HOF	1.8 km	MPC · JPL
805236	2016 CP_{413}	—	February 14, 2016	Mount Lemmon	Mount Lemmon Survey	·	1.1 km	MPC · JPL
805237	2016 CZ_{413}	—	February 5, 2016	Haleakala	Pan-STARRS 1	·	1.1 km	MPC · JPL
805238	2016 CD_{414}	—	February 10, 2016	Haleakala	Pan-STARRS 1	·	1.4 km	MPC · JPL
805239	2016 CH_{414}	—	February 11, 2016	Haleakala	Pan-STARRS 1	KOR	920 m	MPC · JPL
805240	2016 CR_{414}	—	February 11, 2016	Haleakala	Pan-STARRS 1	·	1.2 km	MPC · JPL
805241	2016 CX_{414}	—	February 10, 2016	Haleakala	Pan-STARRS 1	·	1.3 km	MPC · JPL
805242	2016 CD_{415}	—	February 5, 2016	Haleakala	Pan-STARRS 1	·	1.4 km	MPC · JPL
805243	2016 CP_{415}	—	February 5, 2016	Haleakala	Pan-STARRS 1	·	2.2 km	MPC · JPL
805244	2016 CR_{415}	—	February 28, 2012	Haleakala	Pan-STARRS 1	·	1.0 km	MPC · JPL
805245	2016 CV_{415}	—	February 5, 2016	Haleakala	Pan-STARRS 1	·	1.9 km	MPC · JPL
805246	2016 CA_{417}	—	February 9, 2016	Haleakala	Pan-STARRS 1	·	1.6 km	MPC · JPL
805247	2016 CN_{422}	—	February 10, 2016	Haleakala	Pan-STARRS 1	·	1.4 km	MPC · JPL
805248	2016 CR_{422}	—	February 9, 2016	Haleakala	Pan-STARRS 1	·	1.4 km	MPC · JPL
805249	2016 CU_{422}	—	February 5, 2016	Haleakala	Pan-STARRS 1	·	1.4 km	MPC · JPL
805250	2016 CO_{429}	—	October 26, 2014	Mount Lemmon	Mount Lemmon Survey	·	1.4 km	MPC · JPL
805251	2016 CR_{429}	—	February 6, 2016	Haleakala	Pan-STARRS 1	·	1.2 km	MPC · JPL
805252	2016 CU_{429}	—	February 5, 2016	Haleakala	Pan-STARRS 1	·	1.6 km	MPC · JPL
805253	2016 CF_{430}	—	February 9, 2016	Mount Lemmon	Mount Lemmon Survey	·	1.2 km	MPC · JPL
805254	2016 DM	—	December 13, 2015	Haleakala	Pan-STARRS 1	·	400 m	MPC · JPL
805255	2016 DX	—	January 14, 2016	Haleakala	Pan-STARRS 1	·	1.4 km	MPC · JPL
805256	2016 DO_{5}	—	January 9, 2016	Haleakala	Pan-STARRS 1	HNS	890 m	MPC · JPL
805257	2016 DJ_{6}	—	December 21, 2015	Mount Lemmon	Mount Lemmon Survey	·	1.3 km	MPC · JPL
805258	2016 DD_{7}	—	February 27, 2016	Mount Lemmon	Mount Lemmon Survey	·	730 m	MPC · JPL
805259	2016 DV_{8}	—	February 28, 2012	Haleakala	Pan-STARRS 1	·	1 km	MPC · JPL
805260	2016 DN_{9}	—	February 27, 2016	Mount Lemmon	Mount Lemmon Survey	·	980 m	MPC · JPL
805261	2016 DN_{10}	—	February 9, 2016	Haleakala	Pan-STARRS 1	NEM	1.3 km	MPC · JPL
805262	2016 DS_{10}	—	April 1, 2011	Mount Lemmon	Mount Lemmon Survey	·	2.2 km	MPC · JPL
805263	2016 DP_{11}	—	September 23, 2008	Kitt Peak	Spacewatch	·	2.5 km	MPC · JPL
805264	2016 DV_{12}	—	February 6, 2016	Haleakala	Pan-STARRS 1	·	1.3 km	MPC · JPL
805265	2016 DU_{14}	—	February 10, 2016	Haleakala	Pan-STARRS 1	·	2.3 km	MPC · JPL
805266	2016 DK_{15}	—	January 11, 2016	Haleakala	Pan-STARRS 1	·	1.5 km	MPC · JPL
805267	2016 DB_{19}	—	February 28, 2016	Mount Lemmon	Mount Lemmon Survey	·	1.3 km	MPC · JPL
805268	2016 DL_{20}	—	February 26, 2008	Mount Lemmon	Mount Lemmon Survey	3:2 · SHU	3.6 km	MPC · JPL
805269	2016 DH_{22}	—	March 15, 2012	Kitt Peak	Spacewatch	·	1.2 km	MPC · JPL
805270	2016 DZ_{22}	—	February 11, 2016	Haleakala	Pan-STARRS 1	·	930 m	MPC · JPL
805271	2016 DN_{27}	—	February 7, 2016	Catalina	CSS	·	1.2 km	MPC · JPL
805272	2016 DG_{28}	—	December 21, 2006	Kitt Peak	Spacewatch	·	1.0 km	MPC · JPL
805273	2016 DR_{28}	—	December 12, 2014	Mount Lemmon	Mount Lemmon Survey	·	2.3 km	MPC · JPL
805274	2016 DT_{29}	—	May 23, 2011	Mount Lemmon	Mount Lemmon Survey	·	2.4 km	MPC · JPL
805275	2016 DY_{29}	—	February 29, 2016	Haleakala	Pan-STARRS 1	EOS	2.0 km	MPC · JPL
805276	2016 DF_{32}	—	February 25, 2007	Kitt Peak	Spacewatch	·	1.4 km	MPC · JPL
805277	2016 DW_{34}	—	April 19, 2012	Mount Lemmon	Mount Lemmon Survey	·	1.2 km	MPC · JPL
805278	2016 DX_{34}	—	February 29, 2016	Haleakala	Pan-STARRS 1	·	2.1 km	MPC · JPL
805279	2016 DF_{37}	—	February 29, 2016	Haleakala	Pan-STARRS 1	GAL	1.1 km	MPC · JPL
805280	2016 DU_{37}	—	February 27, 2016	Mount Lemmon	Mount Lemmon Survey	·	1.2 km	MPC · JPL
805281	2016 DE_{39}	—	February 29, 2016	Haleakala	Pan-STARRS 1	·	1.1 km	MPC · JPL
805282	2016 DX_{39}	—	February 16, 2016	Nogales	M. Schwartz, P. R. Holvorcem	·	1.0 km	MPC · JPL
805283	2016 DZ_{39}	—	February 29, 2016	Haleakala	Pan-STARRS 1	·	1.9 km	MPC · JPL
805284	2016 DR_{41}	—	February 28, 2016	Haleakala	Pan-STARRS 1	·	1.4 km	MPC · JPL
805285	2016 DA_{42}	—	February 17, 2016	Mount Lemmon	Mount Lemmon Survey	·	1.0 km	MPC · JPL
805286	2016 DB_{42}	—	February 29, 2016	Haleakala	Pan-STARRS 1	·	1.1 km	MPC · JPL
805287	2016 DD_{42}	—	February 9, 2016	Haleakala	Pan-STARRS 1	·	1.2 km	MPC · JPL
805288	2016 DH_{42}	—	February 27, 2016	Mount Lemmon	Mount Lemmon Survey	·	2.3 km	MPC · JPL
805289	2016 DJ_{44}	—	February 29, 2016	Haleakala	Pan-STARRS 1	·	1.7 km	MPC · JPL
805290	2016 DX_{45}	—	February 18, 2016	Mount Lemmon	Mount Lemmon Survey	ADE	1.4 km	MPC · JPL
805291	2016 DH_{46}	—	February 28, 2016	Haleakala	Pan-STARRS 1	·	1.1 km	MPC · JPL
805292	2016 DJ_{46}	—	February 27, 2016	Mount Lemmon	Mount Lemmon Survey	·	1.2 km	MPC · JPL
805293	2016 DL_{47}	—	November 22, 2014	Mount Lemmon	Mount Lemmon Survey	·	1.5 km	MPC · JPL
805294	2016 DP_{47}	—	October 28, 2014	Mount Lemmon	Mount Lemmon Survey	·	1.2 km	MPC · JPL
805295	2016 ER	—	March 14, 2004	Catalina	CSS	·	1.5 km	MPC · JPL
805296	2016 EU_{8}	—	February 3, 2016	Haleakala	Pan-STARRS 1	HNS	910 m	MPC · JPL
805297	2016 ES_{11}	—	March 3, 2016	Haleakala	Pan-STARRS 1	·	1.1 km	MPC · JPL
805298	2016 EB_{12}	—	September 6, 2013	Mount Lemmon	Mount Lemmon Survey	·	3.0 km	MPC · JPL
805299	2016 EH_{13}	—	November 26, 2014	Haleakala	Pan-STARRS 1	EOS	1.3 km	MPC · JPL
805300	2016 EU_{13}	—	April 19, 2012	Mount Lemmon	Mount Lemmon Survey	EUN	790 m	MPC · JPL

== 805301–805400 ==
back to top

Designation			Discovery			Properties		Ref
Permanent	Provisional	Named after	Date	Site	Discoverer(s)	Category	Diam.	Ref
805301	2016 EZ_{13}	—	November 30, 2014	Kitt Peak	Spacewatch	·	1.3 km	MPC · JPL
805302	2016 EP_{14}	—	March 3, 2016	Haleakala	Pan-STARRS 1	·	2.2 km	MPC · JPL
805303	2016 ER_{15}	—	October 31, 2005	Kitt Peak	Spacewatch	·	1.3 km	MPC · JPL
805304	2016 EM_{16}	—	May 19, 2012	Mount Lemmon	Mount Lemmon Survey	·	1.4 km	MPC · JPL
805305	2016 ES_{16}	—	April 16, 2012	Kitt Peak	Spacewatch	·	1.2 km	MPC · JPL
805306	2016 EK_{18}	—	February 11, 2016	Haleakala	Pan-STARRS 1	·	1.1 km	MPC · JPL
805307	2016 EG_{19}	—	January 8, 2016	Haleakala	Pan-STARRS 1	·	1.5 km	MPC · JPL
805308	2016 ER_{19}	—	March 3, 2016	Haleakala	Pan-STARRS 1	·	1.6 km	MPC · JPL
805309	2016 EG_{20}	—	March 3, 2016	Haleakala	Pan-STARRS 1	·	1.2 km	MPC · JPL
805310	2016 EZ_{20}	—	March 3, 2016	Haleakala	Pan-STARRS 1	·	1.3 km	MPC · JPL
805311	2016 EH_{22}	—	March 3, 2016	Haleakala	Pan-STARRS 1	·	1.2 km	MPC · JPL
805312	2016 EQ_{22}	—	February 12, 2016	Haleakala	Pan-STARRS 1	·	1.6 km	MPC · JPL
805313	2016 EM_{26}	—	March 3, 2016	Haleakala	Pan-STARRS 1	·	1.4 km	MPC · JPL
805314	2016 EP_{26}	—	March 3, 2016	Haleakala	Pan-STARRS 1	·	1.6 km	MPC · JPL
805315	2016 EE_{29}	—	March 30, 2011	Mount Lemmon	Mount Lemmon Survey	·	1.7 km	MPC · JPL
805316	2016 EV_{31}	—	October 14, 2010	Mount Lemmon	Mount Lemmon Survey	·	1.0 km	MPC · JPL
805317	2016 EX_{31}	—	March 3, 2016	Haleakala	Pan-STARRS 1	·	1.1 km	MPC · JPL
805318	2016 EC_{33}	—	December 27, 2014	Mount Lemmon	Mount Lemmon Survey	·	1.4 km	MPC · JPL
805319	2016 EH_{33}	—	January 27, 2007	Mount Lemmon	Mount Lemmon Survey	·	1.2 km	MPC · JPL
805320	2016 EP_{34}	—	March 3, 2016	Mount Lemmon	Mount Lemmon Survey	·	1.5 km	MPC · JPL
805321	2016 EW_{34}	—	March 3, 2016	Haleakala	Pan-STARRS 1	·	950 m	MPC · JPL
805322	2016 EK_{35}	—	January 8, 2016	Haleakala	Pan-STARRS 1	·	1.3 km	MPC · JPL
805323	2016 EP_{35}	—	March 3, 2016	Haleakala	Pan-STARRS 1	·	1.3 km	MPC · JPL
805324	2016 EC_{39}	—	December 9, 2015	Haleakala	Pan-STARRS 1	·	1.1 km	MPC · JPL
805325	2016 EG_{39}	—	February 24, 2012	Haleakala	Pan-STARRS 1	·	960 m	MPC · JPL
805326	2016 EN_{39}	—	March 30, 2008	Kitt Peak	Spacewatch	·	880 m	MPC · JPL
805327	2016 ES_{39}	—	January 30, 2011	Haleakala	Pan-STARRS 1	·	1.9 km	MPC · JPL
805328	2016 EP_{40}	—	January 7, 2016	Haleakala	Pan-STARRS 1	·	1.1 km	MPC · JPL
805329	2016 ET_{41}	—	January 4, 2016	Haleakala	Pan-STARRS 1	EUN	900 m	MPC · JPL
805330	2016 EX_{46}	—	January 12, 2015	Haleakala	Pan-STARRS 1	HNS	750 m	MPC · JPL
805331	2016 ER_{49}	—	September 22, 2014	Haleakala	Pan-STARRS 1	HNS	680 m	MPC · JPL
805332	2016 EH_{50}	—	February 11, 2016	Haleakala	Pan-STARRS 1	EUN	600 m	MPC · JPL
805333	2016 ET_{52}	—	March 3, 2016	Haleakala	Pan-STARRS 1	·	1.3 km	MPC · JPL
805334	2016 EE_{54}	—	February 9, 2016	Haleakala	Pan-STARRS 1	·	1.3 km	MPC · JPL
805335	2016 EA_{55}	—	August 17, 2012	Haleakala	Pan-STARRS 1	·	460 m	MPC · JPL
805336	2016 ER_{57}	—	January 8, 2016	Haleakala	Pan-STARRS 1	·	1.2 km	MPC · JPL
805337	2016 EY_{58}	—	January 28, 2007	Kitt Peak	Spacewatch	·	1.2 km	MPC · JPL
805338	2016 EH_{59}	—	March 30, 2012	Mount Lemmon	Mount Lemmon Survey	·	1.0 km	MPC · JPL
805339	2016 EE_{64}	—	January 9, 2016	Haleakala	Pan-STARRS 1	EUN	770 m	MPC · JPL
805340	2016 EM_{72}	—	March 5, 2016	Haleakala	Pan-STARRS 1	·	1.2 km	MPC · JPL
805341	2016 EN_{74}	—	January 14, 2016	Haleakala	Pan-STARRS 1	·	900 m	MPC · JPL
805342	2016 EP_{79}	—	February 12, 2016	Mount Lemmon	Mount Lemmon Survey	·	1.0 km	MPC · JPL
805343	2016 EZ_{81}	—	February 3, 2016	Haleakala	Pan-STARRS 1	·	920 m	MPC · JPL
805344	2016 ES_{91}	—	November 21, 2014	Haleakala	Pan-STARRS 1	·	1.5 km	MPC · JPL
805345	2016 EC_{92}	—	March 3, 2016	Mount Lemmon	Mount Lemmon Survey	·	1.8 km	MPC · JPL
805346	2016 EU_{93}	—	November 22, 2014	Haleakala	Pan-STARRS 1	·	1.2 km	MPC · JPL
805347	2016 EP_{94}	—	February 4, 2016	Haleakala	Pan-STARRS 1	EUN	710 m	MPC · JPL
805348	2016 EQ_{95}	—	March 3, 2016	Mount Lemmon	Mount Lemmon Survey	·	2.2 km	MPC · JPL
805349	2016 ER_{95}	—	October 9, 2007	Mount Lemmon	Mount Lemmon Survey	·	2.5 km	MPC · JPL
805350	2016 EF_{96}	—	March 7, 2016	Haleakala	Pan-STARRS 1	·	1.4 km	MPC · JPL
805351	2016 EP_{96}	—	March 7, 2016	Haleakala	Pan-STARRS 1	·	1.0 km	MPC · JPL
805352	2016 ES_{97}	—	March 7, 2016	Haleakala	Pan-STARRS 1	·	1.9 km	MPC · JPL
805353	2016 EF_{99}	—	October 2, 2014	Haleakala	Pan-STARRS 1	·	1.0 km	MPC · JPL
805354	2016 EH_{99}	—	March 7, 2016	Haleakala	Pan-STARRS 1	·	1.1 km	MPC · JPL
805355	2016 EP_{99}	—	March 7, 2016	Haleakala	Pan-STARRS 1	·	2.1 km	MPC · JPL
805356	2016 EE_{105}	—	November 22, 2014	Haleakala	Pan-STARRS 1	·	1.1 km	MPC · JPL
805357	2016 EL_{106}	—	February 3, 2016	Haleakala	Pan-STARRS 1	·	1.2 km	MPC · JPL
805358	2016 EL_{107}	—	March 7, 2016	Haleakala	Pan-STARRS 1	·	1.1 km	MPC · JPL
805359	2016 EJ_{109}	—	December 26, 2006	Kitt Peak	Spacewatch	·	1.0 km	MPC · JPL
805360	2016 EM_{111}	—	February 10, 2016	Haleakala	Pan-STARRS 1	·	1.3 km	MPC · JPL
805361	2016 ET_{113}	—	March 10, 2016	Mount Lemmon	Mount Lemmon Survey	·	1.1 km	MPC · JPL
805362	2016 ED_{114}	—	September 19, 2014	Haleakala	Pan-STARRS 1	EUN	970 m	MPC · JPL
805363	2016 EU_{115}	—	February 9, 2016	Haleakala	Pan-STARRS 1	·	1.2 km	MPC · JPL
805364	2016 EU_{117}	—	January 3, 2016	Haleakala	Pan-STARRS 1	·	1.4 km	MPC · JPL
805365	2016 EZ_{117}	—	March 10, 2016	Mount Lemmon	Mount Lemmon Survey	·	2.4 km	MPC · JPL
805366	2016 EZ_{122}	—	January 8, 2016	Haleakala	Pan-STARRS 1	·	1.2 km	MPC · JPL
805367	2016 EJ_{130}	—	February 21, 2007	Kitt Peak	Spacewatch	·	920 m	MPC · JPL
805368	2016 EP_{130}	—	March 10, 2016	Haleakala	Pan-STARRS 1	·	1.2 km	MPC · JPL
805369	2016 EX_{130}	—	March 8, 2005	Mount Lemmon	Mount Lemmon Survey	·	1.9 km	MPC · JPL
805370	2016 EE_{131}	—	April 7, 2003	Kitt Peak	Spacewatch	·	1.0 km	MPC · JPL
805371	2016 EP_{149}	—	March 15, 2007	Kitt Peak	Spacewatch	·	1.2 km	MPC · JPL
805372	2016 EF_{152}	—	January 21, 2015	Mount Lemmon	Mount Lemmon Survey	·	1.8 km	MPC · JPL
805373	2016 EK_{154}	—	August 15, 2013	Haleakala	Pan-STARRS 1	·	1.2 km	MPC · JPL
805374	2016 EN_{154}	—	March 4, 2016	Haleakala	Pan-STARRS 1	·	1.3 km	MPC · JPL
805375	2016 ED_{167}	—	March 11, 2016	Haleakala	Pan-STARRS 1	·	1.1 km	MPC · JPL
805376	2016 ER_{170}	—	February 2, 2016	Haleakala	Pan-STARRS 1	·	1.5 km	MPC · JPL
805377	2016 ER_{174}	—	May 14, 2012	Mount Lemmon	Mount Lemmon Survey	EUN	810 m	MPC · JPL
805378	2016 EX_{176}	—	March 12, 2016	Haleakala	Pan-STARRS 1	·	960 m	MPC · JPL
805379	2016 EC_{177}	—	March 24, 2003	Kitt Peak	Spacewatch	·	1.2 km	MPC · JPL
805380	2016 EX_{177}	—	June 1, 2012	Mount Lemmon	Mount Lemmon Survey	·	1.2 km	MPC · JPL
805381	2016 EG_{179}	—	October 14, 2014	Mount Lemmon	Mount Lemmon Survey	·	1.4 km	MPC · JPL
805382	2016 EV_{180}	—	February 23, 2007	Kitt Peak	Spacewatch	·	1.2 km	MPC · JPL
805383	2016 EL_{182}	—	March 12, 2016	Haleakala	Pan-STARRS 1	·	1.3 km	MPC · JPL
805384	2016 EX_{182}	—	April 21, 2012	Mount Lemmon	Mount Lemmon Survey	·	1.5 km	MPC · JPL
805385	2016 EA_{184}	—	December 21, 2014	Haleakala	Pan-STARRS 1	·	2.5 km	MPC · JPL
805386	2016 EG_{187}	—	March 13, 2016	Haleakala	Pan-STARRS 1	·	1.3 km	MPC · JPL
805387	2016 ER_{187}	—	November 17, 2014	Haleakala	Pan-STARRS 1	·	2.1 km	MPC · JPL
805388	2016 EZ_{189}	—	May 16, 2012	Mount Lemmon	Mount Lemmon Survey	·	1.3 km	MPC · JPL
805389	2016 EY_{190}	—	October 1, 2005	Mount Lemmon	Mount Lemmon Survey	·	1.1 km	MPC · JPL
805390	2016 EJ_{192}	—	February 25, 2012	Mount Lemmon	Mount Lemmon Survey	(1547)	1.2 km	MPC · JPL
805391	2016 EO_{195}	—	February 5, 2016	Haleakala	Pan-STARRS 1	EUN	850 m	MPC · JPL
805392	2016 EH_{208}	—	March 4, 2016	Haleakala	Pan-STARRS 1	·	1.2 km	MPC · JPL
805393	2016 EP_{209}	—	March 5, 2016	Haleakala	Pan-STARRS 1	·	1.5 km	MPC · JPL
805394	2016 EV_{209}	—	March 5, 2016	Haleakala	Pan-STARRS 1	·	1.5 km	MPC · JPL
805395	2016 EY_{209}	—	March 5, 2016	Haleakala	Pan-STARRS 1	·	1.5 km	MPC · JPL
805396	2016 EU_{210}	—	March 9, 2016	Haleakala	Pan-STARRS 1	·	1.6 km	MPC · JPL
805397	2016 EE_{212}	—	March 10, 2016	Haleakala	Pan-STARRS 1	·	1.0 km	MPC · JPL
805398	2016 EY_{212}	—	February 9, 2016	Mount Lemmon	Mount Lemmon Survey	AEO	770 m	MPC · JPL
805399	2016 EF_{213}	—	March 11, 2016	Haleakala	Pan-STARRS 1	·	1.4 km	MPC · JPL
805400	2016 EG_{213}	—	March 11, 2016	Haleakala	Pan-STARRS 1	·	1.5 km	MPC · JPL

== 805401–805500 ==
back to top

Designation			Discovery			Properties		Ref
Permanent	Provisional	Named after	Date	Site	Discoverer(s)	Category	Diam.	Ref
805401	2016 EV_{213}	—	March 12, 2016	Haleakala	Pan-STARRS 1	·	1.2 km	MPC · JPL
805402	2016 EJ_{217}	—	November 25, 2005	Kitt Peak	Spacewatch	·	1.2 km	MPC · JPL
805403	2016 EP_{217}	—	January 19, 2007	Mauna Kea	P. A. Wiegert	·	870 m	MPC · JPL
805404	2016 EB_{220}	—	March 25, 2007	Mount Lemmon	Mount Lemmon Survey	EUN	920 m	MPC · JPL
805405	2016 EG_{220}	—	April 25, 2007	Mount Lemmon	Mount Lemmon Survey	·	1.6 km	MPC · JPL
805406	2016 EK_{221}	—	January 2, 2011	Mount Lemmon	Mount Lemmon Survey	·	1.1 km	MPC · JPL
805407	2016 ES_{225}	—	March 4, 2016	Haleakala	Pan-STARRS 1	MRX	650 m	MPC · JPL
805408	2016 ER_{226}	—	March 4, 2016	Haleakala	Pan-STARRS 1	WIT	730 m	MPC · JPL
805409	2016 ES_{228}	—	March 8, 2016	Haleakala	Pan-STARRS 1	·	1.0 km	MPC · JPL
805410	2016 ER_{230}	—	November 27, 2014	Haleakala	Pan-STARRS 1	·	1.6 km	MPC · JPL
805411	2016 EF_{231}	—	April 6, 2011	Mount Lemmon	Mount Lemmon Survey	·	2.2 km	MPC · JPL
805412	2016 EQ_{231}	—	March 3, 2016	Haleakala	Pan-STARRS 1	·	1.3 km	MPC · JPL
805413	2016 EJ_{237}	—	March 5, 2011	Mount Lemmon	Mount Lemmon Survey	·	1.3 km	MPC · JPL
805414	2016 EZ_{237}	—	March 7, 2016	Haleakala	Pan-STARRS 1	KON	1.9 km	MPC · JPL
805415	2016 EX_{238}	—	April 27, 2012	Haleakala	Pan-STARRS 1	·	1.0 km	MPC · JPL
805416	2016 EQ_{239}	—	November 26, 2014	Haleakala	Pan-STARRS 1	·	1.5 km	MPC · JPL
805417	2016 EW_{239}	—	February 9, 2016	Haleakala	Pan-STARRS 1	·	1.1 km	MPC · JPL
805418	2016 EV_{240}	—	March 10, 2016	Haleakala	Pan-STARRS 1	·	2.3 km	MPC · JPL
805419	2016 EM_{242}	—	March 10, 2016	Haleakala	Pan-STARRS 1	·	1.0 km	MPC · JPL
805420	2016 EW_{242}	—	November 29, 2014	Mount Lemmon	Mount Lemmon Survey	·	1.1 km	MPC · JPL
805421	2016 EG_{243}	—	October 3, 2013	Haleakala	Pan-STARRS 1	·	1.2 km	MPC · JPL
805422	2016 ES_{245}	—	March 12, 2016	Haleakala	Pan-STARRS 1	·	1.2 km	MPC · JPL
805423	2016 EH_{248}	—	November 22, 2014	Haleakala	Pan-STARRS 1	·	1.2 km	MPC · JPL
805424	2016 EJ_{248}	—	October 9, 2013	Mount Lemmon	Mount Lemmon Survey	GAL	1.0 km	MPC · JPL
805425	2016 ET_{250}	—	March 7, 2016	Haleakala	Pan-STARRS 1	·	1.5 km	MPC · JPL
805426	2016 ER_{251}	—	March 7, 2016	Haleakala	Pan-STARRS 1	CLO	1.5 km	MPC · JPL
805427	2016 ET_{251}	—	March 4, 2016	Haleakala	Pan-STARRS 1	·	1.2 km	MPC · JPL
805428	2016 EV_{252}	—	March 3, 2016	Haleakala	Pan-STARRS 1	·	1.4 km	MPC · JPL
805429	2016 EQ_{254}	—	March 2, 2016	Haleakala	Pan-STARRS 1	·	1.1 km	MPC · JPL
805430	2016 EB_{255}	—	March 5, 2016	Haleakala	Pan-STARRS 1	·	1.5 km	MPC · JPL
805431	2016 EP_{255}	—	March 10, 2016	Mount Lemmon	Mount Lemmon Survey	·	1.1 km	MPC · JPL
805432	2016 EU_{255}	—	March 6, 2016	Haleakala	Pan-STARRS 1	·	1.1 km	MPC · JPL
805433	2016 ER_{256}	—	March 10, 2016	Haleakala	Pan-STARRS 1	·	1.3 km	MPC · JPL
805434	2016 EA_{257}	—	March 12, 2016	Haleakala	Pan-STARRS 1	·	1.4 km	MPC · JPL
805435	2016 EF_{257}	—	March 4, 2016	Haleakala	Pan-STARRS 1	·	1.4 km	MPC · JPL
805436	2016 ES_{257}	—	March 14, 2016	Mount Lemmon	Mount Lemmon Survey	·	1.2 km	MPC · JPL
805437	2016 EW_{258}	—	March 13, 2016	Haleakala	Pan-STARRS 1	HNS	810 m	MPC · JPL
805438	2016 EY_{258}	—	March 1, 2016	Haleakala	Pan-STARRS 1	·	1.3 km	MPC · JPL
805439	2016 ED_{260}	—	March 11, 2016	Mount Lemmon	Mount Lemmon Survey	·	2.5 km	MPC · JPL
805440	2016 EN_{262}	—	March 4, 2016	Haleakala	Pan-STARRS 1	·	1.3 km	MPC · JPL
805441	2016 ER_{262}	—	March 3, 2016	Haleakala	Pan-STARRS 1	MAR	810 m	MPC · JPL
805442	2016 ER_{263}	—	March 3, 2016	Haleakala	Pan-STARRS 1	EOS	1.4 km	MPC · JPL
805443	2016 EJ_{264}	—	March 10, 2016	Haleakala	Pan-STARRS 1	·	1.1 km	MPC · JPL
805444	2016 EV_{264}	—	March 10, 2016	Haleakala	Pan-STARRS 1	EUN	910 m	MPC · JPL
805445	2016 EJ_{265}	—	February 8, 2011	Mount Lemmon	Mount Lemmon Survey	AGN	700 m	MPC · JPL
805446	2016 EY_{265}	—	March 4, 2016	Haleakala	Pan-STARRS 1	·	1.2 km	MPC · JPL
805447	2016 EG_{266}	—	February 5, 2011	Haleakala	Pan-STARRS 1	·	1.2 km	MPC · JPL
805448	2016 EB_{267}	—	March 6, 2016	Haleakala	Pan-STARRS 1	·	1.0 km	MPC · JPL
805449	2016 EG_{268}	—	March 13, 2016	Haleakala	Pan-STARRS 1	AGN	710 m	MPC · JPL
805450	2016 EY_{268}	—	March 1, 2016	Mount Lemmon	Mount Lemmon Survey	·	2.5 km	MPC · JPL
805451	2016 EC_{269}	—	March 6, 2016	Haleakala	Pan-STARRS 1	·	1.0 km	MPC · JPL
805452	2016 ET_{270}	—	March 11, 2016	Kitt Peak	Spacewatch	·	1.0 km	MPC · JPL
805453	2016 EV_{271}	—	March 13, 2016	Haleakala	Pan-STARRS 1	·	1.0 km	MPC · JPL
805454	2016 EN_{274}	—	March 13, 2016	Haleakala	Pan-STARRS 1	·	1.9 km	MPC · JPL
805455	2016 ES_{274}	—	March 13, 2016	Haleakala	Pan-STARRS 1	·	1.1 km	MPC · JPL
805456	2016 ET_{274}	—	March 4, 2016	Haleakala	Pan-STARRS 1	·	1.4 km	MPC · JPL
805457	2016 EG_{275}	—	March 1, 2016	Mount Lemmon	Mount Lemmon Survey	·	1.0 km	MPC · JPL
805458	2016 EQ_{275}	—	March 10, 2016	Haleakala	Pan-STARRS 1	·	1.1 km	MPC · JPL
805459	2016 EZ_{275}	—	March 4, 2016	Haleakala	Pan-STARRS 1	·	1.3 km	MPC · JPL
805460	2016 EB_{276}	—	March 3, 2016	Mount Lemmon	Mount Lemmon Survey	·	1.8 km	MPC · JPL
805461	2016 ER_{276}	—	March 7, 2016	Haleakala	Pan-STARRS 1	·	2.1 km	MPC · JPL
805462	2016 ED_{279}	—	March 12, 2016	Mount Lemmon	Mount Lemmon Survey	AEO	760 m	MPC · JPL
805463	2016 EO_{279}	—	March 12, 2016	Haleakala	Pan-STARRS 1	·	1.5 km	MPC · JPL
805464	2016 ED_{281}	—	March 12, 2016	Haleakala	Pan-STARRS 1	·	1 km	MPC · JPL
805465	2016 EL_{284}	—	March 5, 2016	Haleakala	Pan-STARRS 1	·	1.6 km	MPC · JPL
805466	2016 EV_{284}	—	March 10, 2016	Haleakala	Pan-STARRS 1	·	2.1 km	MPC · JPL
805467	2016 EZ_{284}	—	March 7, 2016	Haleakala	Pan-STARRS 1	·	2.5 km	MPC · JPL
805468	2016 EZ_{286}	—	March 10, 2016	Haleakala	Pan-STARRS 1	AGN	810 m	MPC · JPL
805469	2016 ET_{287}	—	March 10, 2016	Haleakala	Pan-STARRS 1	·	2.0 km	MPC · JPL
805470	2016 EZ_{287}	—	March 10, 2016	Haleakala	Pan-STARRS 1	·	1.2 km	MPC · JPL
805471	2016 EF_{288}	—	March 4, 2016	Haleakala	Pan-STARRS 1	·	2.3 km	MPC · JPL
805472	2016 EP_{288}	—	March 13, 2016	Haleakala	Pan-STARRS 1	HNS	710 m	MPC · JPL
805473	2016 EW_{289}	—	March 5, 2016	Haleakala	Pan-STARRS 1	URS	2.4 km	MPC · JPL
805474	2016 EN_{293}	—	March 13, 2016	Haleakala	Pan-STARRS 1	·	1.7 km	MPC · JPL
805475	2016 EF_{294}	—	March 4, 2016	Haleakala	Pan-STARRS 1	·	1.3 km	MPC · JPL
805476	2016 ES_{294}	—	March 4, 2016	Haleakala	Pan-STARRS 1	·	2.2 km	MPC · JPL
805477	2016 EA_{296}	—	March 7, 2016	Haleakala	Pan-STARRS 1	·	1.3 km	MPC · JPL
805478	2016 ED_{296}	—	March 4, 2016	Haleakala	Pan-STARRS 1	·	1.4 km	MPC · JPL
805479	2016 ED_{298}	—	January 16, 2015	Haleakala	Pan-STARRS 1	·	1.9 km	MPC · JPL
805480	2016 EJ_{298}	—	March 2, 2016	Mount Lemmon	Mount Lemmon Survey	·	1.2 km	MPC · JPL
805481	2016 EY_{299}	—	March 4, 2016	Haleakala	Pan-STARRS 1	·	1.4 km	MPC · JPL
805482	2016 EZ_{300}	—	March 12, 2016	Haleakala	Pan-STARRS 1	·	1.4 km	MPC · JPL
805483	2016 EA_{301}	—	March 6, 2016	Haleakala	Pan-STARRS 1	·	1.2 km	MPC · JPL
805484	2016 EL_{301}	—	March 14, 2016	Mount Lemmon	Mount Lemmon Survey	·	1.2 km	MPC · JPL
805485	2016 EK_{302}	—	March 10, 2016	Haleakala	Pan-STARRS 1	·	1.2 km	MPC · JPL
805486	2016 EQ_{302}	—	March 13, 2016	Haleakala	Pan-STARRS 1	·	1.2 km	MPC · JPL
805487	2016 EE_{303}	—	March 2, 2016	Mount Lemmon	Mount Lemmon Survey	·	1.2 km	MPC · JPL
805488	2016 EG_{303}	—	January 18, 2015	Mount Lemmon	Mount Lemmon Survey	3:2	3.9 km	MPC · JPL
805489	2016 EL_{303}	—	September 14, 2013	Haleakala	Pan-STARRS 1	·	2.2 km	MPC · JPL
805490	2016 EH_{304}	—	March 11, 2016	Haleakala	Pan-STARRS 1	JUN	800 m	MPC · JPL
805491	2016 EX_{304}	—	March 12, 2016	Haleakala	Pan-STARRS 1	·	1.1 km	MPC · JPL
805492	2016 EV_{306}	—	March 11, 2016	Mount Lemmon	Mount Lemmon Survey	·	1.0 km	MPC · JPL
805493	2016 EW_{309}	—	March 6, 2016	Haleakala	Pan-STARRS 1	·	2.5 km	MPC · JPL
805494	2016 EA_{312}	—	March 12, 2016	Haleakala	Pan-STARRS 1	·	1.4 km	MPC · JPL
805495	2016 EO_{313}	—	March 10, 2016	Haleakala	Pan-STARRS 1	(13314)	1.4 km	MPC · JPL
805496	2016 EW_{313}	—	March 1, 2016	Mount Lemmon	Mount Lemmon Survey	·	1.7 km	MPC · JPL
805497	2016 EB_{314}	—	March 14, 2016	Mount Lemmon	Mount Lemmon Survey	·	1.4 km	MPC · JPL
805498	2016 ED_{314}	—	March 7, 2016	Haleakala	Pan-STARRS 1	·	1.6 km	MPC · JPL
805499	2016 EH_{314}	—	March 6, 2016	Cerro Paranal	Altmann, M., Prusti, T.	·	1.2 km	MPC · JPL
805500	2016 ES_{316}	—	March 4, 2016	Haleakala	Pan-STARRS 1	(5)	890 m	MPC · JPL

== 805501–805600 ==
back to top

Designation			Discovery			Properties		Ref
Permanent	Provisional	Named after	Date	Site	Discoverer(s)	Category	Diam.	Ref
805501	2016 EV_{316}	—	April 15, 2012	Haleakala	Pan-STARRS 1	·	1.1 km	MPC · JPL
805502	2016 EH_{317}	—	March 12, 2016	Haleakala	Pan-STARRS 1	·	2.0 km	MPC · JPL
805503	2016 EB_{319}	—	March 12, 2016	Haleakala	Pan-STARRS 1	·	1.1 km	MPC · JPL
805504	2016 EO_{320}	—	March 4, 2016	Haleakala	Pan-STARRS 1	·	1.5 km	MPC · JPL
805505	2016 ES_{321}	—	March 10, 2016	Haleakala	Pan-STARRS 1	·	1.3 km	MPC · JPL
805506	2016 ED_{324}	—	March 5, 2016	Haleakala	Pan-STARRS 1	(18466)	1.9 km	MPC · JPL
805507	2016 EP_{324}	—	January 14, 2015	Haleakala	Pan-STARRS 1	BRA	1.0 km	MPC · JPL
805508	2016 EJ_{334}	—	March 13, 2016	Haleakala	Pan-STARRS 1	GEF	680 m	MPC · JPL
805509	2016 EN_{334}	—	August 16, 2012	ESA OGS	ESA OGS	THM	1.9 km	MPC · JPL
805510	2016 ES_{334}	—	March 10, 2016	Haleakala	Pan-STARRS 1	·	2.1 km	MPC · JPL
805511	2016 EL_{336}	—	March 10, 2016	Haleakala	Pan-STARRS 1	·	1.8 km	MPC · JPL
805512	2016 ET_{341}	—	March 6, 2016	Haleakala	Pan-STARRS 1	·	1.3 km	MPC · JPL
805513	2016 ES_{351}	—	March 1, 2016	Haleakala	Pan-STARRS 1	·	2.5 km	MPC · JPL
805514	2016 EH_{352}	—	March 11, 2016	Mount Lemmon	Mount Lemmon Survey	THM	1.9 km	MPC · JPL
805515	2016 EA_{353}	—	March 13, 2016	Haleakala	Pan-STARRS 1	·	2.3 km	MPC · JPL
805516	2016 EH_{353}	—	March 1, 2016	Haleakala	Pan-STARRS 1	·	1.6 km	MPC · JPL
805517	2016 EL_{354}	—	March 13, 2016	Haleakala	Pan-STARRS 1	·	1.5 km	MPC · JPL
805518	2016 EQ_{354}	—	March 7, 2016	Haleakala	Pan-STARRS 1	·	1.6 km	MPC · JPL
805519	2016 ET_{354}	—	March 1, 2016	Mount Lemmon	Mount Lemmon Survey	·	1.4 km	MPC · JPL
805520	2016 EV_{354}	—	November 20, 2014	Mount Lemmon	Mount Lemmon Survey	·	990 m	MPC · JPL
805521	2016 EU_{355}	—	March 6, 2016	Haleakala	Pan-STARRS 1	·	1.2 km	MPC · JPL
805522	2016 EZ_{361}	—	March 6, 2016	Haleakala	Pan-STARRS 1	·	1.8 km	MPC · JPL
805523	2016 EU_{396}	—	March 10, 2016	Mount Lemmon	Mount Lemmon Survey	·	1.8 km	MPC · JPL
805524	2016 EO_{397}	—	March 14, 2016	Mount Lemmon	Mount Lemmon Survey	·	2.3 km	MPC · JPL
805525	2016 ER_{397}	—	March 12, 2016	Haleakala	Pan-STARRS 1	·	1.8 km	MPC · JPL
805526	2016 EA_{398}	—	March 2, 2016	Mount Lemmon	Mount Lemmon Survey	·	1.5 km	MPC · JPL
805527	2016 EX_{398}	—	November 17, 2014	Haleakala	Pan-STARRS 1	·	1.2 km	MPC · JPL
805528	2016 FV_{3}	—	March 19, 2016	Haleakala	Pan-STARRS 1	·	1.2 km	MPC · JPL
805529	2016 FN_{8}	—	February 16, 2007	Palomar Mountain	NEAT	·	900 m	MPC · JPL
805530	2016 FC_{10}	—	April 7, 2011	Kitt Peak	Spacewatch	THM	1.9 km	MPC · JPL
805531	2016 FF_{11}	—	March 28, 2012	Kitt Peak	Spacewatch	·	1.1 km	MPC · JPL
805532	2016 FU_{17}	—	March 13, 2007	Mount Lemmon	Mount Lemmon Survey	·	1.1 km	MPC · JPL
805533	2016 FE_{19}	—	December 1, 2014	Mount Lemmon	Mount Lemmon Survey	HNS	1.0 km	MPC · JPL
805534	2016 FV_{20}	—	March 30, 2016	Haleakala	Pan-STARRS 1	·	1.5 km	MPC · JPL
805535	2016 FG_{23}	—	March 10, 2016	Haleakala	Pan-STARRS 1	·	1.9 km	MPC · JPL
805536	2016 FE_{25}	—	January 13, 2011	Kitt Peak	Spacewatch	·	1.4 km	MPC · JPL
805537	2016 FL_{26}	—	March 13, 2007	Kitt Peak	Spacewatch	·	1.2 km	MPC · JPL
805538	2016 FL_{28}	—	March 31, 2016	Mount Lemmon	Mount Lemmon Survey	·	1.7 km	MPC · JPL
805539	2016 FQ_{29}	—	March 10, 2016	Haleakala	Pan-STARRS 1	·	1.5 km	MPC · JPL
805540	2016 FF_{30}	—	January 29, 2011	Mount Lemmon	Mount Lemmon Survey	AEO	670 m	MPC · JPL
805541	2016 FH_{30}	—	February 11, 2011	Mount Lemmon	Mount Lemmon Survey	MRX	600 m	MPC · JPL
805542	2016 FJ_{30}	—	October 7, 2004	Anderson Mesa	LONEOS	·	1.5 km	MPC · JPL
805543	2016 FZ_{32}	—	March 10, 2016	Haleakala	Pan-STARRS 1	·	1.0 km	MPC · JPL
805544	2016 FC_{34}	—	September 16, 2009	Kitt Peak	Spacewatch	·	1.6 km	MPC · JPL
805545	2016 FW_{37}	—	February 5, 2011	Haleakala	Pan-STARRS 1	·	1.1 km	MPC · JPL
805546	2016 FD_{39}	—	December 16, 2014	Haleakala	Pan-STARRS 1	·	2.4 km	MPC · JPL
805547	2016 FB_{40}	—	October 28, 2014	Haleakala	Pan-STARRS 1	HNS	650 m	MPC · JPL
805548	2016 FO_{40}	—	March 1, 2016	Haleakala	Pan-STARRS 1	·	1.2 km	MPC · JPL
805549	2016 FY_{41}	—	March 31, 2016	Mount Lemmon	Mount Lemmon Survey	·	1.3 km	MPC · JPL
805550	2016 FK_{42}	—	January 9, 2016	Haleakala	Pan-STARRS 1	·	1.3 km	MPC · JPL
805551	2016 FE_{43}	—	January 13, 2011	Mount Lemmon	Mount Lemmon Survey	·	900 m	MPC · JPL
805552	2016 FH_{44}	—	February 5, 2016	Haleakala	Pan-STARRS 1	·	1.1 km	MPC · JPL
805553	2016 FC_{45}	—	February 25, 2007	Mount Lemmon	Mount Lemmon Survey	·	1.2 km	MPC · JPL
805554	2016 FD_{45}	—	October 25, 2014	Haleakala	Pan-STARRS 1	·	1.2 km	MPC · JPL
805555	2016 FF_{50}	—	February 19, 2007	Mount Lemmon	Mount Lemmon Survey	·	1.2 km	MPC · JPL
805556	2016 FB_{51}	—	March 16, 2002	Kitt Peak	Spacewatch	·	1.3 km	MPC · JPL
805557	2016 FJ_{51}	—	March 12, 2016	Haleakala	Pan-STARRS 1	·	1.3 km	MPC · JPL
805558	2016 FC_{53}	—	October 8, 2008	Kitt Peak	Spacewatch	·	1.8 km	MPC · JPL
805559	2016 FZ_{53}	—	March 4, 2016	Haleakala	Pan-STARRS 1	KOR	1.0 km	MPC · JPL
805560	2016 FC_{62}	—	March 17, 2016	Haleakala	Pan-STARRS 1	·	1.9 km	MPC · JPL
805561	2016 FL_{63}	—	May 26, 2012	Mount Lemmon	Mount Lemmon Survey	ADE	1.4 km	MPC · JPL
805562	2016 FV_{63}	—	March 31, 2016	Haleakala	Pan-STARRS 1	·	1.4 km	MPC · JPL
805563	2016 FJ_{66}	—	March 17, 2016	Haleakala	Pan-STARRS 1	·	1.7 km	MPC · JPL
805564	2016 FU_{68}	—	March 17, 2016	Mount Lemmon	Mount Lemmon Survey	·	980 m	MPC · JPL
805565	2016 FD_{69}	—	March 16, 2016	Haleakala	Pan-STARRS 1	·	1.6 km	MPC · JPL
805566	2016 FV_{70}	—	March 31, 2016	Haleakala	Pan-STARRS 1	·	1.4 km	MPC · JPL
805567	2016 FB_{71}	—	March 28, 2016	Mount Lemmon	Mount Lemmon Survey	·	900 m	MPC · JPL
805568	2016 FM_{71}	—	March 30, 2016	Haleakala	Pan-STARRS 1	·	1.3 km	MPC · JPL
805569	2016 FQ_{71}	—	March 31, 2016	Haleakala	Pan-STARRS 1	·	1.5 km	MPC · JPL
805570	2016 FO_{73}	—	March 16, 2016	Haleakala	Pan-STARRS 1	·	1.4 km	MPC · JPL
805571	2016 FC_{74}	—	March 16, 2016	Haleakala	Pan-STARRS 1	·	1.2 km	MPC · JPL
805572	2016 FJ_{74}	—	March 16, 2016	Haleakala	Pan-STARRS 1	·	630 m	MPC · JPL
805573	2016 FP_{74}	—	March 31, 2016	Haleakala	Pan-STARRS 1	·	1.4 km	MPC · JPL
805574	2016 FR_{75}	—	March 31, 2016	Haleakala	Pan-STARRS 1	·	1.5 km	MPC · JPL
805575	2016 FT_{76}	—	March 16, 2016	Haleakala	Pan-STARRS 1	·	1.7 km	MPC · JPL
805576	2016 FU_{76}	—	March 18, 2016	Haleakala	Pan-STARRS 1	·	2.5 km	MPC · JPL
805577	2016 FX_{77}	—	March 28, 2016	Mount Lemmon	Mount Lemmon Survey	·	1.3 km	MPC · JPL
805578	2016 FK_{78}	—	March 16, 2016	Mount Lemmon	Mount Lemmon Survey	·	1.0 km	MPC · JPL
805579	2016 FO_{78}	—	March 28, 2016	Mount Lemmon	Mount Lemmon Survey	AGN	780 m	MPC · JPL
805580	2016 FT_{78}	—	November 20, 2008	Kitt Peak	Spacewatch	·	2.3 km	MPC · JPL
805581	2016 FD_{79}	—	March 17, 2016	Cerro Paranal	Gaia Ground Based Optical Tracking	·	1.2 km	MPC · JPL
805582	2016 FV_{79}	—	March 16, 2016	Haleakala	Pan-STARRS 1	·	1.3 km	MPC · JPL
805583	2016 FY_{80}	—	March 30, 2016	Haleakala	Pan-STARRS 1	·	1.2 km	MPC · JPL
805584	2016 FZ_{80}	—	March 28, 2016	Mount Lemmon	Mount Lemmon Survey	·	1.2 km	MPC · JPL
805585	2016 FC_{81}	—	March 31, 2016	Mount Lemmon	Mount Lemmon Survey	·	1.1 km	MPC · JPL
805586	2016 FO_{82}	—	March 18, 2016	Mount Lemmon	Mount Lemmon Survey	·	1.9 km	MPC · JPL
805587	2016 FB_{83}	—	March 16, 2016	Haleakala	Pan-STARRS 1	·	1.4 km	MPC · JPL
805588	2016 FN_{83}	—	February 11, 2016	Haleakala	Pan-STARRS 1	·	1.2 km	MPC · JPL
805589	2016 FO_{83}	—	March 16, 2016	Haleakala	Pan-STARRS 1	·	2.5 km	MPC · JPL
805590	2016 FJ_{85}	—	December 11, 2014	Mount Lemmon	Mount Lemmon Survey	·	1.4 km	MPC · JPL
805591	2016 FV_{86}	—	March 28, 2016	Cerro Tololo	DECam	·	2.4 km	MPC · JPL
805592	2016 FX_{90}	—	March 29, 2016	Cerro Tololo-DECam	DECam	·	1.9 km	MPC · JPL
805593	2016 FD_{94}	—	March 30, 2016	Cerro Tololo	DECam	·	1.4 km	MPC · JPL
805594	2016 FJ_{120}	—	December 22, 2008	Kitt Peak	Spacewatch	·	2.1 km	MPC · JPL
805595	2016 FW_{130}	—	March 16, 2016	Haleakala	Pan-STARRS 1	·	1.9 km	MPC · JPL
805596	2016 FE_{131}	—	March 31, 2016	Haleakala	Pan-STARRS 1	·	2.1 km	MPC · JPL
805597	2016 FM_{135}	—	October 28, 2005	Kitt Peak	Spacewatch	·	1.2 km	MPC · JPL
805598	2016 FK_{138}	—	August 29, 2006	Kitt Peak	Spacewatch	THB	2.2 km	MPC · JPL
805599	2016 FJ_{151}	—	April 3, 2016	Haleakala	Pan-STARRS 1	·	2.3 km	MPC · JPL
805600	2016 FK_{155}	—	March 29, 2016	Cerro Tololo-DECam	DECam	·	1.2 km	MPC · JPL

== 805601–805700 ==
back to top

Designation			Discovery			Properties		Ref
Permanent	Provisional	Named after	Date	Site	Discoverer(s)	Category	Diam.	Ref
805601	2016 FP_{155}	—	March 30, 2016	Haleakala	Pan-STARRS 1	·	1.6 km	MPC · JPL
805602	2016 FK_{157}	—	March 29, 2016	Cerro Tololo-DECam	DECam	·	880 m	MPC · JPL
805603	2016 FO_{157}	—	March 28, 2016	Cerro Tololo	DECam	·	1.1 km	MPC · JPL
805604	2016 FP_{170}	—	March 31, 2016	Cerro Tololo	DECam	·	1.2 km	MPC · JPL
805605	2016 FK_{171}	—	March 28, 2016	Mount Lemmon	Mount Lemmon Survey	·	1.6 km	MPC · JPL
805606	2016 FD_{193}	—	March 29, 2016	Cerro Tololo-DECam	DECam	·	1.3 km	MPC · JPL
805607	2016 GM_{1}	—	February 15, 2016	Haleakala	Pan-STARRS 1	·	1.6 km	MPC · JPL
805608	2016 GO_{2}	—	April 14, 2007	Catalina	CSS	·	1.3 km	MPC · JPL
805609	2016 GQ_{4}	—	January 18, 2016	Haleakala	Pan-STARRS 1	·	1.2 km	MPC · JPL
805610	2016 GA_{6}	—	March 10, 2016	Haleakala	Pan-STARRS 1	·	1.3 km	MPC · JPL
805611	2016 GH_{7}	—	February 14, 2010	Mount Lemmon	Mount Lemmon Survey	·	2.0 km	MPC · JPL
805612	2016 GL_{7}	—	March 14, 2007	Mount Lemmon	Mount Lemmon Survey	DOR	1.2 km	MPC · JPL
805613	2016 GG_{8}	—	September 6, 2008	Kitt Peak	Spacewatch	·	1.3 km	MPC · JPL
805614	2016 GE_{11}	—	October 25, 2014	Mount Lemmon	Mount Lemmon Survey	EUN	770 m	MPC · JPL
805615	2016 GQ_{13}	—	March 10, 2016	Haleakala	Pan-STARRS 1	·	1.3 km	MPC · JPL
805616	2016 GN_{15}	—	March 12, 2016	Haleakala	Pan-STARRS 1	JUN	610 m	MPC · JPL
805617	2016 GP_{16}	—	September 25, 2013	Mount Lemmon	Mount Lemmon Survey	·	1.1 km	MPC · JPL
805618	2016 GC_{19}	—	March 10, 2016	Haleakala	Pan-STARRS 1	EOS	1.2 km	MPC · JPL
805619	2016 GD_{19}	—	March 13, 2016	Haleakala	Pan-STARRS 1	HYG	2.0 km	MPC · JPL
805620	2016 GG_{20}	—	February 5, 2011	Mount Lemmon	Mount Lemmon Survey	·	1.2 km	MPC · JPL
805621	2016 GV_{21}	—	April 1, 2016	Haleakala	Pan-STARRS 1	·	1.1 km	MPC · JPL
805622	2016 GZ_{21}	—	March 10, 2016	Haleakala	Pan-STARRS 1	·	1.1 km	MPC · JPL
805623	2016 GJ_{23}	—	April 1, 2016	Haleakala	Pan-STARRS 1	·	1.2 km	MPC · JPL
805624	2016 GL_{24}	—	September 24, 2013	Mount Lemmon	Mount Lemmon Survey	·	1.1 km	MPC · JPL
805625	2016 GU_{26}	—	March 10, 2016	Haleakala	Pan-STARRS 1	·	1.1 km	MPC · JPL
805626	2016 GH_{31}	—	October 3, 2013	Kitt Peak	Spacewatch	EUN	920 m	MPC · JPL
805627	2016 GL_{31}	—	March 2, 2016	Haleakala	Pan-STARRS 1	·	1.3 km	MPC · JPL
805628	2016 GQ_{35}	—	March 10, 2016	Haleakala	Pan-STARRS 1	·	1.9 km	MPC · JPL
805629	2016 GM_{36}	—	September 9, 2013	Haleakala	Pan-STARRS 1	·	1.4 km	MPC · JPL
805630	2016 GW_{36}	—	January 14, 2015	Haleakala	Pan-STARRS 1	·	1.8 km	MPC · JPL
805631	2016 GB_{39}	—	December 26, 2014	Haleakala	Pan-STARRS 1	·	840 m	MPC · JPL
805632	2016 GJ_{39}	—	August 12, 2013	Haleakala	Pan-STARRS 1	·	1.1 km	MPC · JPL
805633	2016 GH_{41}	—	March 10, 2016	Haleakala	Pan-STARRS 1	·	810 m	MPC · JPL
805634	2016 GQ_{42}	—	March 11, 2007	Kitt Peak	Spacewatch	·	1.1 km	MPC · JPL
805635	2016 GY_{42}	—	March 10, 2016	Haleakala	Pan-STARRS 1	EOS	1.3 km	MPC · JPL
805636	2016 GQ_{43}	—	November 17, 2014	Haleakala	Pan-STARRS 1	·	530 m	MPC · JPL
805637	2016 GV_{44}	—	February 23, 2007	Mount Lemmon	Mount Lemmon Survey	·	1.0 km	MPC · JPL
805638	2016 GR_{46}	—	February 22, 2007	Kitt Peak	Spacewatch	MIS	1.7 km	MPC · JPL
805639	2016 GB_{47}	—	March 10, 2016	Haleakala	Pan-STARRS 1	·	1.4 km	MPC · JPL
805640	2016 GC_{49}	—	March 28, 2016	Mount Lemmon	Mount Lemmon Survey	KOR	1.1 km	MPC · JPL
805641	2016 GE_{52}	—	March 4, 2016	Haleakala	Pan-STARRS 1	·	1.2 km	MPC · JPL
805642	2016 GK_{53}	—	October 3, 2013	Mount Lemmon	Mount Lemmon Survey	KOR	910 m	MPC · JPL
805643	2016 GL_{55}	—	October 1, 2013	Mount Lemmon	Mount Lemmon Survey	·	1.3 km	MPC · JPL
805644	2016 GG_{57}	—	January 23, 2011	Mount Lemmon	Mount Lemmon Survey	·	1.0 km	MPC · JPL
805645	2016 GF_{58}	—	March 19, 2016	Mount Lemmon	Mount Lemmon Survey	·	990 m	MPC · JPL
805646	2016 GK_{59}	—	August 15, 2013	Haleakala	Pan-STARRS 1	·	1.0 km	MPC · JPL
805647	2016 GR_{61}	—	April 1, 2016	Haleakala	Pan-STARRS 1	·	1.2 km	MPC · JPL
805648	2016 GY_{62}	—	October 15, 2009	Mount Lemmon	Mount Lemmon Survey	·	990 m	MPC · JPL
805649	2016 GH_{67}	—	April 1, 2016	Haleakala	Pan-STARRS 1	·	1.4 km	MPC · JPL
805650	2016 GV_{68}	—	April 1, 2016	Mount Lemmon	Mount Lemmon Survey	·	1.3 km	MPC · JPL
805651	2016 GW_{68}	—	March 10, 2016	Haleakala	Pan-STARRS 1	·	1.3 km	MPC · JPL
805652	2016 GP_{69}	—	April 1, 2016	Haleakala	Pan-STARRS 1	AGN	750 m	MPC · JPL
805653	2016 GL_{71}	—	April 1, 2016	Haleakala	Pan-STARRS 1	·	1.0 km	MPC · JPL
805654	2016 GE_{72}	—	January 16, 2015	Haleakala	Pan-STARRS 1	·	1.2 km	MPC · JPL
805655	2016 GH_{73}	—	September 7, 2008	Mount Lemmon	Mount Lemmon Survey	·	1.2 km	MPC · JPL
805656	2016 GJ_{73}	—	October 3, 2013	Mount Lemmon	Mount Lemmon Survey	·	1.2 km	MPC · JPL
805657	2016 GG_{76}	—	March 10, 2016	Haleakala	Pan-STARRS 1	·	940 m	MPC · JPL
805658	2016 GU_{76}	—	August 14, 2013	Haleakala	Pan-STARRS 1	·	760 m	MPC · JPL
805659	2016 GN_{78}	—	September 15, 2007	Mount Lemmon	Mount Lemmon Survey	·	1.6 km	MPC · JPL
805660	2016 GV_{78}	—	March 4, 2016	Haleakala	Pan-STARRS 1	·	1.1 km	MPC · JPL
805661	2016 GX_{79}	—	September 26, 2009	Kitt Peak	Spacewatch	HNS	700 m	MPC · JPL
805662	2016 GQ_{80}	—	April 1, 2016	Haleakala	Pan-STARRS 1	AGN	720 m	MPC · JPL
805663	2016 GT_{81}	—	April 7, 2002	Cerro Tololo	Deep Ecliptic Survey	AGN	740 m	MPC · JPL
805664	2016 GX_{81}	—	April 1, 2016	Haleakala	Pan-STARRS 1	·	630 m	MPC · JPL
805665	2016 GY_{82}	—	March 10, 2016	Haleakala	Pan-STARRS 1	·	2.3 km	MPC · JPL
805666	2016 GD_{86}	—	January 20, 2015	Mount Lemmon	Mount Lemmon Survey	·	2.1 km	MPC · JPL
805667	2016 GG_{86}	—	September 1, 2013	Haleakala	Pan-STARRS 1	·	930 m	MPC · JPL
805668	2016 GB_{87}	—	November 20, 2008	Kitt Peak	Spacewatch	·	1.7 km	MPC · JPL
805669	2016 GN_{87}	—	March 10, 2016	Haleakala	Pan-STARRS 1	CLA	1.3 km	MPC · JPL
805670	2016 GA_{88}	—	May 1, 2003	Kitt Peak	Spacewatch	·	1.1 km	MPC · JPL
805671	2016 GH_{88}	—	April 1, 2016	Haleakala	Pan-STARRS 1	·	1.3 km	MPC · JPL
805672	2016 GF_{90}	—	December 26, 2014	Haleakala	Pan-STARRS 1	·	1.2 km	MPC · JPL
805673	2016 GR_{91}	—	April 1, 2016	Haleakala	Pan-STARRS 1	·	1.2 km	MPC · JPL
805674	2016 GJ_{92}	—	January 17, 2016	Haleakala	Pan-STARRS 1	JUN	970 m	MPC · JPL
805675	2016 GQ_{93}	—	April 1, 2016	Haleakala	Pan-STARRS 1	·	1.2 km	MPC · JPL
805676	2016 GV_{93}	—	April 1, 2016	Haleakala	Pan-STARRS 1	·	1.5 km	MPC · JPL
805677	2016 GV_{94}	—	April 1, 2016	Haleakala	Pan-STARRS 1	·	2.2 km	MPC · JPL
805678	2016 GS_{95}	—	April 1, 2016	Haleakala	Pan-STARRS 1	·	1.2 km	MPC · JPL
805679	2016 GF_{97}	—	April 1, 2016	Haleakala	Pan-STARRS 1	·	1.0 km	MPC · JPL
805680	2016 GG_{98}	—	April 1, 2016	Haleakala	Pan-STARRS 1	HOF	1.8 km	MPC · JPL
805681	2016 GF_{99}	—	April 1, 2016	Haleakala	Pan-STARRS 1	AGN	830 m	MPC · JPL
805682	2016 GH_{99}	—	April 1, 2016	Haleakala	Pan-STARRS 1	·	1.2 km	MPC · JPL
805683	2016 GJ_{103}	—	April 1, 2016	Haleakala	Pan-STARRS 1	WIT	610 m	MPC · JPL
805684	2016 GA_{106}	—	April 1, 2016	Haleakala	Pan-STARRS 1	·	1.3 km	MPC · JPL
805685	2016 GM_{107}	—	September 30, 2013	Kitt Peak	Spacewatch	·	1.2 km	MPC · JPL
805686	2016 GT_{115}	—	March 31, 2016	Mount Lemmon	Mount Lemmon Survey	·	1.9 km	MPC · JPL
805687	2016 GZ_{115}	—	February 23, 2007	Kitt Peak	Spacewatch	·	1.0 km	MPC · JPL
805688	2016 GE_{117}	—	February 5, 2011	Haleakala	Pan-STARRS 1	·	1.1 km	MPC · JPL
805689	2016 GK_{118}	—	February 8, 2011	Mount Lemmon	Mount Lemmon Survey	·	1.0 km	MPC · JPL
805690	2016 GQ_{120}	—	February 9, 2011	Mount Lemmon	Mount Lemmon Survey	AEO	690 m	MPC · JPL
805691	2016 GT_{120}	—	April 1, 2016	Haleakala	Pan-STARRS 1	·	1.3 km	MPC · JPL
805692	2016 GY_{120}	—	April 1, 2016	Haleakala	Pan-STARRS 1	WIT	700 m	MPC · JPL
805693	2016 GU_{122}	—	February 13, 2011	Mount Lemmon	Mount Lemmon Survey	·	1.2 km	MPC · JPL
805694	2016 GQ_{123}	—	April 1, 2016	Haleakala	Pan-STARRS 1	·	1.5 km	MPC · JPL
805695	2016 GW_{126}	—	February 10, 2011	Mount Lemmon	Mount Lemmon Survey	MRX	640 m	MPC · JPL
805696	2016 GF_{130}	—	October 7, 2007	Mount Lemmon	Mount Lemmon Survey	·	2.0 km	MPC · JPL
805697	2016 GY_{132}	—	January 17, 2016	Haleakala	Pan-STARRS 1	·	1.6 km	MPC · JPL
805698	2016 GE_{133}	—	April 1, 2016	Haleakala	Pan-STARRS 1	·	1.2 km	MPC · JPL
805699	2016 GD_{137}	—	September 15, 2009	Kitt Peak	Spacewatch	·	1.1 km	MPC · JPL
805700	2016 GT_{137}	—	March 10, 2016	Haleakala	Pan-STARRS 1	·	1.7 km	MPC · JPL

== 805701–805800 ==
back to top

Designation			Discovery			Properties		Ref
Permanent	Provisional	Named after	Date	Site	Discoverer(s)	Category	Diam.	Ref
805701	2016 GR_{138}	—	January 23, 2011	Mount Lemmon	Mount Lemmon Survey	·	1.1 km	MPC · JPL
805702	2016 GY_{139}	—	April 1, 2016	Haleakala	Pan-STARRS 1	·	2.0 km	MPC · JPL
805703	2016 GS_{143}	—	January 16, 2016	Haleakala	Pan-STARRS 1	·	1.3 km	MPC · JPL
805704	2016 GC_{149}	—	April 2, 2016	Haleakala	Pan-STARRS 1	GEF	810 m	MPC · JPL
805705	2016 GN_{149}	—	April 2, 2016	Haleakala	Pan-STARRS 1	·	1.3 km	MPC · JPL
805706	2016 GT_{153}	—	March 1, 2016	Mount Lemmon	Mount Lemmon Survey	·	1.3 km	MPC · JPL
805707	2016 GS_{156}	—	February 10, 2016	Haleakala	Pan-STARRS 1	·	1.0 km	MPC · JPL
805708	2016 GN_{159}	—	February 8, 2011	Mount Lemmon	Mount Lemmon Survey	·	1.3 km	MPC · JPL
805709	2016 GD_{160}	—	March 14, 2016	Mount Lemmon	Mount Lemmon Survey	·	1.4 km	MPC · JPL
805710	2016 GS_{160}	—	January 26, 2011	Mount Lemmon	Mount Lemmon Survey	NEM	1.5 km	MPC · JPL
805711	2016 GN_{161}	—	March 14, 2016	Mount Lemmon	Mount Lemmon Survey	·	2.3 km	MPC · JPL
805712	2016 GT_{163}	—	April 3, 2016	Mount Lemmon	Mount Lemmon Survey	EOS	1.6 km	MPC · JPL
805713	2016 GN_{165}	—	February 11, 2016	Haleakala	Pan-STARRS 1	·	1.5 km	MPC · JPL
805714	2016 GC_{166}	—	December 29, 2014	Haleakala	Pan-STARRS 1	PAD	1.1 km	MPC · JPL
805715	2016 GK_{170}	—	April 3, 2016	Haleakala	Pan-STARRS 1	·	1.2 km	MPC · JPL
805716	2016 GH_{172}	—	January 27, 2011	Mount Lemmon	Mount Lemmon Survey	·	1.0 km	MPC · JPL
805717	2016 GJ_{172}	—	April 3, 2016	Haleakala	Pan-STARRS 1	·	2.1 km	MPC · JPL
805718	2016 GS_{177}	—	January 30, 2011	Mount Lemmon	Mount Lemmon Survey	·	1.1 km	MPC · JPL
805719	2016 GT_{180}	—	March 8, 2016	Haleakala	Pan-STARRS 1	·	1.8 km	MPC · JPL
805720	2016 GG_{185}	—	March 6, 2016	Haleakala	Pan-STARRS 1	·	1.3 km	MPC · JPL
805721	2016 GM_{185}	—	February 11, 2016	Haleakala	Pan-STARRS 1	·	1.5 km	MPC · JPL
805722	2016 GR_{185}	—	November 1, 2013	Mount Lemmon	Mount Lemmon Survey	·	1.4 km	MPC · JPL
805723	2016 GG_{188}	—	February 11, 2016	Haleakala	Pan-STARRS 1	·	1.3 km	MPC · JPL
805724	2016 GK_{194}	—	February 5, 2011	Haleakala	Pan-STARRS 1	·	1.2 km	MPC · JPL
805725	2016 GM_{194}	—	April 30, 2012	Mount Lemmon	Mount Lemmon Survey	·	1.5 km	MPC · JPL
805726	2016 GO_{195}	—	April 1, 2016	Haleakala	Pan-STARRS 1	·	1.8 km	MPC · JPL
805727	2016 GB_{199}	—	August 14, 2012	Haleakala	Pan-STARRS 1	·	2.2 km	MPC · JPL
805728	2016 GO_{200}	—	March 10, 2007	Mount Lemmon	Mount Lemmon Survey	·	1.1 km	MPC · JPL
805729	2016 GK_{202}	—	March 14, 2016	Mount Lemmon	Mount Lemmon Survey	·	1.3 km	MPC · JPL
805730	2016 GK_{205}	—	March 30, 2016	Haleakala	Pan-STARRS 1	·	1.3 km	MPC · JPL
805731	2016 GS_{205}	—	April 5, 2016	Haleakala	Pan-STARRS 1	GEF	780 m	MPC · JPL
805732	2016 GP_{207}	—	March 8, 2016	Haleakala	Pan-STARRS 1	·	1.2 km	MPC · JPL
805733	2016 GT_{208}	—	March 16, 2016	Haleakala	Pan-STARRS 1	·	1.1 km	MPC · JPL
805734	2016 GR_{210}	—	April 1, 2016	Haleakala	Pan-STARRS 1	·	1.3 km	MPC · JPL
805735	2016 GE_{212}	—	February 10, 2011	Mount Lemmon	Mount Lemmon Survey	·	1.3 km	MPC · JPL
805736	2016 GY_{213}	—	April 2, 2016	Haleakala	Pan-STARRS 1	·	2.0 km	MPC · JPL
805737	2016 GW_{216}	—	April 11, 2016	Haleakala	Pan-STARRS 1	AMO	110 m	MPC · JPL
805738	2016 GG_{225}	—	March 6, 2016	Haleakala	Pan-STARRS 1	·	1.1 km	MPC · JPL
805739	2016 GL_{226}	—	February 5, 2011	Haleakala	Pan-STARRS 1	MRX	690 m	MPC · JPL
805740	2016 GB_{232}	—	February 25, 2011	Mount Lemmon	Mount Lemmon Survey	·	1.3 km	MPC · JPL
805741	2016 GV_{235}	—	April 14, 2016	Haleakala	Pan-STARRS 1	·	1.2 km	MPC · JPL
805742	2016 GC_{240}	—	February 10, 2016	Haleakala	Pan-STARRS 1	·	2.8 km	MPC · JPL
805743	2016 GH_{244}	—	January 28, 2011	Mount Lemmon	Mount Lemmon Survey	·	1.1 km	MPC · JPL
805744	2016 GF_{246}	—	February 25, 2011	Mount Lemmon	Mount Lemmon Survey	·	1.3 km	MPC · JPL
805745	2016 GJ_{246}	—	April 3, 2016	Haleakala	Pan-STARRS 1	DOR	1.6 km	MPC · JPL
805746	2016 GS_{250}	—	April 3, 2016	Haleakala	Pan-STARRS 1	·	850 m	MPC · JPL
805747	2016 GX_{254}	—	April 1, 2016	Haleakala	Pan-STARRS 1	·	1.0 km	MPC · JPL
805748	2016 GZ_{255}	—	April 6, 2016	Mount Lemmon	Mount Lemmon Survey	·	1.3 km	MPC · JPL
805749	2016 GL_{256}	—	April 11, 2016	Haleakala	Pan-STARRS 1	·	1.7 km	MPC · JPL
805750	2016 GP_{256}	—	April 11, 2016	Haleakala	Pan-STARRS 1	·	1.5 km	MPC · JPL
805751	2016 GH_{260}	—	November 16, 2009	Mount Lemmon	Mount Lemmon Survey	DOR	1.9 km	MPC · JPL
805752	2016 GK_{261}	—	January 16, 2015	Haleakala	Pan-STARRS 1	·	1.6 km	MPC · JPL
805753	2016 GM_{261}	—	February 22, 2015	Haleakala	Pan-STARRS 1	·	2.5 km	MPC · JPL
805754	2016 GF_{262}	—	April 2, 2016	Kitt Peak	Spacewatch	·	1.1 km	MPC · JPL
805755	2016 GP_{263}	—	April 4, 2016	Haleakala	Pan-STARRS 1	ADE	1.6 km	MPC · JPL
805756	2016 GF_{265}	—	April 5, 2016	Haleakala	Pan-STARRS 1	·	2.5 km	MPC · JPL
805757	2016 GG_{265}	—	April 5, 2016	Haleakala	Pan-STARRS 1	·	1.2 km	MPC · JPL
805758	2016 GS_{265}	—	January 28, 2011	Mount Lemmon	Mount Lemmon Survey	·	1.1 km	MPC · JPL
805759	2016 GQ_{266}	—	November 26, 2014	Haleakala	Pan-STARRS 1	·	1.1 km	MPC · JPL
805760	2016 GS_{267}	—	April 15, 2016	Haleakala	Pan-STARRS 1	·	1.0 km	MPC · JPL
805761	2016 GT_{268}	—	April 15, 2016	Haleakala	Pan-STARRS 1	·	690 m	MPC · JPL
805762	2016 GD_{270}	—	April 4, 2016	Mount Lemmon	Mount Lemmon Survey	·	1.5 km	MPC · JPL
805763	2016 GJ_{270}	—	April 15, 2016	Haleakala	Pan-STARRS 1	·	1.4 km	MPC · JPL
805764	2016 GY_{270}	—	April 3, 2016	Mount Lemmon	Mount Lemmon Survey	·	1.3 km	MPC · JPL
805765	2016 GZ_{270}	—	April 11, 2016	Haleakala	Pan-STARRS 1	·	1.2 km	MPC · JPL
805766	2016 GX_{271}	—	April 3, 2016	Haleakala	Pan-STARRS 1	EUN	890 m	MPC · JPL
805767	2016 GB_{272}	—	April 13, 2016	Haleakala	Pan-STARRS 1	·	1.5 km	MPC · JPL
805768	2016 GD_{272}	—	April 12, 2016	Haleakala	Pan-STARRS 1	·	1.5 km	MPC · JPL
805769	2016 GC_{275}	—	April 3, 2016	Haleakala	Pan-STARRS 1	·	1.2 km	MPC · JPL
805770	2016 GH_{275}	—	April 1, 2016	Haleakala	Pan-STARRS 1	·	1.1 km	MPC · JPL
805771	2016 GA_{276}	—	April 5, 2016	Haleakala	Pan-STARRS 1	·	1.1 km	MPC · JPL
805772	2016 GH_{276}	—	April 11, 2016	Haleakala	Pan-STARRS 1	·	1.8 km	MPC · JPL
805773	2016 GL_{278}	—	April 11, 2016	Haleakala	Pan-STARRS 1	EUN	790 m	MPC · JPL
805774	2016 GW_{278}	—	April 1, 2016	Catalina	CSS	·	1.6 km	MPC · JPL
805775	2016 GE_{279}	—	April 11, 2016	Haleakala	Pan-STARRS 1	·	1.9 km	MPC · JPL
805776	2016 GJ_{279}	—	April 3, 2016	Haleakala	Pan-STARRS 1	·	1.2 km	MPC · JPL
805777	2016 GP_{279}	—	April 3, 2016	Haleakala	Pan-STARRS 1	·	1.2 km	MPC · JPL
805778	2016 GJ_{280}	—	April 2, 2016	Mount Lemmon	Mount Lemmon Survey	·	1.4 km	MPC · JPL
805779	2016 GA_{282}	—	April 3, 2016	Haleakala	Pan-STARRS 1	·	1.3 km	MPC · JPL
805780	2016 GC_{283}	—	April 14, 2016	Haleakala	Pan-STARRS 1	critical	1.4 km	MPC · JPL
805781	2016 GK_{283}	—	April 3, 2016	Haleakala	Pan-STARRS 1	·	1.1 km	MPC · JPL
805782	2016 GF_{285}	—	April 3, 2016	Mount Lemmon	Mount Lemmon Survey	·	920 m	MPC · JPL
805783	2016 GW_{285}	—	April 4, 2016	Haleakala	Pan-STARRS 1	·	1.6 km	MPC · JPL
805784	2016 GZ_{285}	—	April 12, 2016	Haleakala	Pan-STARRS 1	·	2.0 km	MPC · JPL
805785	2016 GN_{286}	—	April 12, 2016	Haleakala	Pan-STARRS 1	·	1.4 km	MPC · JPL
805786	2016 GS_{289}	—	April 12, 2016	Haleakala	Pan-STARRS 1	·	520 m	MPC · JPL
805787	2016 GP_{290}	—	April 10, 2016	Haleakala	Pan-STARRS 1	·	2.5 km	MPC · JPL
805788	2016 GJ_{291}	—	April 3, 2016	Mount Lemmon	Mount Lemmon Survey	·	1.4 km	MPC · JPL
805789	2016 GP_{294}	—	April 1, 2016	Haleakala	Pan-STARRS 1	·	960 m	MPC · JPL
805790	2016 GY_{294}	—	April 3, 2016	Haleakala	Pan-STARRS 1	·	1.3 km	MPC · JPL
805791	2016 GB_{296}	—	April 1, 2016	Haleakala	Pan-STARRS 1	·	1.9 km	MPC · JPL
805792	2016 GY_{296}	—	April 10, 2016	Haleakala	Pan-STARRS 1	·	1.8 km	MPC · JPL
805793	2016 GA_{298}	—	April 3, 2016	Haleakala	Pan-STARRS 1	·	1.9 km	MPC · JPL
805794	2016 GY_{298}	—	April 1, 2016	Haleakala	Pan-STARRS 1	·	2.2 km	MPC · JPL
805795	2016 GZ_{298}	—	April 9, 2016	Haleakala	Pan-STARRS 1	EMA	2.8 km	MPC · JPL
805796	2016 GO_{301}	—	April 5, 2016	Haleakala	Pan-STARRS 1	L4	5.6 km	MPC · JPL
805797	2016 GR_{301}	—	April 4, 2016	Haleakala	Pan-STARRS 1	·	1.6 km	MPC · JPL
805798	2016 GZ_{301}	—	April 1, 2016	Haleakala	Pan-STARRS 1	·	1.2 km	MPC · JPL
805799	2016 GC_{302}	—	April 2, 2016	Mount Lemmon	Mount Lemmon Survey	·	1.7 km	MPC · JPL
805800	2016 GV_{302}	—	April 1, 2016	Mount Lemmon	Mount Lemmon Survey	·	1.1 km	MPC · JPL

== 805801–805900 ==
back to top

Designation			Discovery			Properties		Ref
Permanent	Provisional	Named after	Date	Site	Discoverer(s)	Category	Diam.	Ref
805801	2016 GH_{303}	—	April 1, 2016	Haleakala	Pan-STARRS 1	·	1.2 km	MPC · JPL
805802	2016 GG_{304}	—	April 1, 2016	Haleakala	Pan-STARRS 1	·	1.2 km	MPC · JPL
805803	2016 GJ_{304}	—	April 3, 2016	Mount Lemmon	Mount Lemmon Survey	·	1.2 km	MPC · JPL
805804	2016 GR_{304}	—	April 1, 2016	Haleakala	Pan-STARRS 1	·	1.6 km	MPC · JPL
805805	2016 GK_{305}	—	January 16, 2015	Haleakala	Pan-STARRS 1	HOF	1.9 km	MPC · JPL
805806	2016 GO_{305}	—	October 14, 2007	Mount Lemmon	Mount Lemmon Survey	·	2.1 km	MPC · JPL
805807	2016 GS_{305}	—	April 1, 2016	Haleakala	Pan-STARRS 1	·	850 m	MPC · JPL
805808	2016 GJ_{306}	—	April 5, 2016	Haleakala	Pan-STARRS 1	KOR	900 m	MPC · JPL
805809	2016 GR_{306}	—	April 1, 2016	Haleakala	Pan-STARRS 1	·	2.9 km	MPC · JPL
805810	2016 GS_{306}	—	April 10, 2016	Haleakala	Pan-STARRS 1	BRA	1.2 km	MPC · JPL
805811	2016 GT_{306}	—	April 1, 2016	Haleakala	Pan-STARRS 1	·	840 m	MPC · JPL
805812	2016 GU_{306}	—	April 10, 2016	Haleakala	Pan-STARRS 1	URS	2.1 km	MPC · JPL
805813	2016 GX_{306}	—	April 12, 2016	Haleakala	Pan-STARRS 1	·	970 m	MPC · JPL
805814	2016 GZ_{306}	—	January 13, 2015	Haleakala	Pan-STARRS 1	·	1.4 km	MPC · JPL
805815	2016 GF_{307}	—	April 14, 2016	Haleakala	Pan-STARRS 1	·	1.5 km	MPC · JPL
805816	2016 GC_{312}	—	April 14, 2016	Haleakala	Pan-STARRS 1	·	1.6 km	MPC · JPL
805817	2016 GT_{316}	—	April 1, 2016	Mount Lemmon	Mount Lemmon Survey	·	1.0 km	MPC · JPL
805818	2016 GO_{317}	—	April 3, 2016	Haleakala	Pan-STARRS 1	·	2.0 km	MPC · JPL
805819	2016 GK_{318}	—	April 12, 2016	Haleakala	Pan-STARRS 1	·	1.5 km	MPC · JPL
805820	2016 GT_{318}	—	April 12, 2016	Haleakala	Pan-STARRS 1	MRX	660 m	MPC · JPL
805821	2016 GW_{318}	—	April 12, 2016	Haleakala	Pan-STARRS 1	·	1.3 km	MPC · JPL
805822	2016 GM_{320}	—	February 5, 2011	Haleakala	Pan-STARRS 1	WIT	680 m	MPC · JPL
805823	2016 GA_{321}	—	January 28, 2011	Mount Lemmon	Mount Lemmon Survey	·	1.2 km	MPC · JPL
805824	2016 GM_{321}	—	April 2, 2016	Haleakala	Pan-STARRS 1	MRX	630 m	MPC · JPL
805825	2016 GE_{322}	—	April 15, 2016	Haleakala	Pan-STARRS 1	·	1.4 km	MPC · JPL
805826	2016 GM_{322}	—	April 12, 2016	Haleakala	Pan-STARRS 1	·	1.2 km	MPC · JPL
805827	2016 GW_{323}	—	April 3, 2016	Haleakala	Pan-STARRS 1	·	1.4 km	MPC · JPL
805828	2016 GH_{324}	—	April 1, 2016	Haleakala	Pan-STARRS 1	EOS	1.2 km	MPC · JPL
805829	2016 GF_{327}	—	April 1, 2016	Mount Lemmon	Mount Lemmon Survey	·	1.0 km	MPC · JPL
805830	2016 GR_{334}	—	April 11, 2016	Haleakala	Pan-STARRS 1	·	2.4 km	MPC · JPL
805831	2016 GV_{334}	—	April 3, 2016	Haleakala	Pan-STARRS 1	EOS	1.2 km	MPC · JPL
805832	2016 GR_{337}	—	November 17, 2014	Mount Lemmon	Mount Lemmon Survey	·	1.1 km	MPC · JPL
805833	2016 GS_{338}	—	April 2, 2016	Mount Lemmon	Mount Lemmon Survey	·	1.3 km	MPC · JPL
805834	2016 GU_{338}	—	September 9, 2007	Kitt Peak	Spacewatch	·	1.9 km	MPC · JPL
805835	2016 GM_{343}	—	April 3, 2016	Haleakala	Pan-STARRS 1	HOF	1.8 km	MPC · JPL
805836	2016 GT_{343}	—	April 1, 2016	Haleakala	Pan-STARRS 1	·	1.4 km	MPC · JPL
805837	2016 GU_{343}	—	April 1, 2016	Haleakala	Pan-STARRS 1	·	1.0 km	MPC · JPL
805838	2016 GB_{344}	—	April 1, 2016	Haleakala	Pan-STARRS 1	·	1.3 km	MPC · JPL
805839	2016 GJ_{344}	—	April 1, 2016	Haleakala	Pan-STARRS 1	·	1.3 km	MPC · JPL
805840	2016 GN_{344}	—	September 25, 2013	Mount Lemmon	Mount Lemmon Survey	HOF	1.8 km	MPC · JPL
805841	2016 GO_{344}	—	April 14, 2016	Mount Lemmon	Mount Lemmon Survey	·	1.3 km	MPC · JPL
805842	2016 GX_{344}	—	October 5, 2013	Mount Lemmon	Mount Lemmon Survey	·	1.1 km	MPC · JPL
805843	2016 GY_{344}	—	April 5, 2016	Haleakala	Pan-STARRS 1	HOF	1.7 km	MPC · JPL
805844	2016 GK_{345}	—	April 9, 2016	Haleakala	Pan-STARRS 1	·	1.4 km	MPC · JPL
805845	2016 GC_{346}	—	April 15, 2016	Mount Lemmon	Mount Lemmon Survey	·	1.2 km	MPC · JPL
805846	2016 GD_{347}	—	January 17, 2015	Mount Lemmon	Mount Lemmon Survey	·	1.3 km	MPC · JPL
805847	2016 GR_{347}	—	April 4, 2016	Haleakala	Pan-STARRS 1	GEF	830 m	MPC · JPL
805848	2016 GU_{351}	—	April 3, 2016	Haleakala	Pan-STARRS 1	·	1.1 km	MPC · JPL
805849	2016 GP_{356}	—	April 4, 2016	Haleakala	Pan-STARRS 1	·	2.2 km	MPC · JPL
805850	2016 GM_{357}	—	April 12, 2016	Haleakala	Pan-STARRS 1	VER	1.9 km	MPC · JPL
805851	2016 GY_{358}	—	April 3, 2016	Mount Lemmon	Mount Lemmon Survey	·	1.6 km	MPC · JPL
805852	2016 GJ_{359}	—	April 11, 2016	Haleakala	Pan-STARRS 1	·	1.5 km	MPC · JPL
805853	2016 GG_{360}	—	April 3, 2016	Haleakala	Pan-STARRS 1	NEM	1.4 km	MPC · JPL
805854	2016 GR_{361}	—	April 3, 2016	Mount Lemmon	Mount Lemmon Survey	·	1.1 km	MPC · JPL
805855	2016 GR_{363}	—	April 1, 2016	Haleakala	Pan-STARRS 1	TRE	1.5 km	MPC · JPL
805856	2016 GO_{370}	—	April 8, 2016	Mauna Kea	COIAS	·	1.8 km	MPC · JPL
805857	2016 HB_{1}	—	March 18, 2007	Kitt Peak	Spacewatch	·	1.3 km	MPC · JPL
805858	2016 HT_{1}	—	April 5, 2016	Haleakala	Pan-STARRS 1	·	1.2 km	MPC · JPL
805859	2016 HC_{11}	—	April 30, 2016	Haleakala	Pan-STARRS 1	GAL	1.3 km	MPC · JPL
805860	2016 HW_{12}	—	April 30, 2016	Haleakala	Pan-STARRS 1	·	1.7 km	MPC · JPL
805861	2016 HT_{15}	—	April 5, 2016	Haleakala	Pan-STARRS 1	·	1.1 km	MPC · JPL
805862	2016 HQ_{16}	—	March 23, 2004	Kitt Peak	Spacewatch	·	2.1 km	MPC · JPL
805863	2016 HT_{18}	—	October 6, 2008	Mount Lemmon	Mount Lemmon Survey	·	1.6 km	MPC · JPL
805864	2016 HY_{18}	—	March 15, 2016	Haleakala	Pan-STARRS 1	·	1.3 km	MPC · JPL
805865	2016 HD_{27}	—	September 6, 2008	Catalina	CSS	·	1.4 km	MPC · JPL
805866	2016 HK_{27}	—	April 16, 2016	Haleakala	Pan-STARRS 1	·	1.4 km	MPC · JPL
805867	2016 HE_{28}	—	October 24, 2013	Mount Lemmon	Mount Lemmon Survey	·	1.4 km	MPC · JPL
805868	2016 HL_{28}	—	April 27, 2016	Mount Lemmon	Mount Lemmon Survey	·	1.5 km	MPC · JPL
805869	2016 HR_{28}	—	April 29, 2016	Mount Lemmon	Mount Lemmon Survey	MRX	670 m	MPC · JPL
805870	2016 HR_{29}	—	April 26, 2016	Mount Lemmon	Mount Lemmon Survey	·	1.3 km	MPC · JPL
805871	2016 HS_{29}	—	April 30, 2016	Haleakala	Pan-STARRS 1	·	1.3 km	MPC · JPL
805872	2016 HF_{30}	—	April 30, 2016	Haleakala	Pan-STARRS 1	·	1.1 km	MPC · JPL
805873	2016 HV_{30}	—	April 30, 2016	Haleakala	Pan-STARRS 1	·	1.4 km	MPC · JPL
805874	2016 HB_{31}	—	April 29, 2016	Haleakala	Pan-STARRS 1	·	1.5 km	MPC · JPL
805875	2016 HX_{31}	—	April 17, 2016	Haleakala	Pan-STARRS 1	BRA	1.1 km	MPC · JPL
805876	2016 HB_{33}	—	April 30, 2016	Kitt Peak	Spacewatch	·	1.5 km	MPC · JPL
805877	2016 HB_{34}	—	April 30, 2016	Haleakala	Pan-STARRS 1	·	1.3 km	MPC · JPL
805878	2016 HN_{36}	—	April 27, 2016	Mount Lemmon	Mount Lemmon Survey	·	1.2 km	MPC · JPL
805879	2016 HR_{36}	—	April 30, 2016	Haleakala	Pan-STARRS 1	·	1.5 km	MPC · JPL
805880	2016 HA_{37}	—	October 26, 2013	Mount Lemmon	Mount Lemmon Survey	AGN	750 m	MPC · JPL
805881	2016 HO_{38}	—	April 27, 2016	Mount Lemmon	Mount Lemmon Survey	·	1.7 km	MPC · JPL
805882	2016 HL_{44}	—	April 30, 2016	Haleakala	Pan-STARRS 1	·	1.4 km	MPC · JPL
805883	2016 HT_{45}	—	August 13, 2012	Haleakala	Pan-STARRS 1	·	1.4 km	MPC · JPL
805884	2016 HK_{47}	—	April 30, 2016	Haleakala	Pan-STARRS 1	·	1.5 km	MPC · JPL
805885	2016 HT_{47}	—	October 23, 2013	Mount Lemmon	Mount Lemmon Survey	KOR	910 m	MPC · JPL
805886	2016 HQ_{48}	—	April 30, 2016	Haleakala	Pan-STARRS 1	·	1.3 km	MPC · JPL
805887	2016 HS_{48}	—	December 21, 2014	Haleakala	Pan-STARRS 1	·	1.2 km	MPC · JPL
805888	2016 JJ_{7}	—	April 5, 2016	Haleakala	Pan-STARRS 1	·	1.5 km	MPC · JPL
805889	2016 JC_{9}	—	November 20, 2014	Mount Lemmon	Mount Lemmon Survey	·	1.7 km	MPC · JPL
805890	2016 JR_{9}	—	February 10, 2011	Mount Lemmon	Mount Lemmon Survey	·	1.3 km	MPC · JPL
805891	2016 JT_{13}	—	March 25, 2007	Mount Lemmon	Mount Lemmon Survey	EUN	890 m	MPC · JPL
805892	2016 JU_{15}	—	May 4, 2016	Haleakala	Pan-STARRS 1	·	1.0 km	MPC · JPL
805893	2016 JQ_{17}	—	March 4, 2016	Haleakala	Pan-STARRS 1	APO	700 m	MPC · JPL
805894	2016 JN_{19}	—	December 27, 2014	Mount Lemmon	Mount Lemmon Survey	DOR	1.8 km	MPC · JPL
805895	2016 JN_{20}	—	March 11, 2011	Kitt Peak	Spacewatch	·	1.3 km	MPC · JPL
805896	2016 JC_{21}	—	March 15, 2016	Haleakala	Pan-STARRS 1	·	1.5 km	MPC · JPL
805897	2016 JC_{24}	—	March 7, 2016	Haleakala	Pan-STARRS 1	·	1.4 km	MPC · JPL
805898	2016 JB_{28}	—	May 9, 2016	Mount Lemmon	Mount Lemmon Survey	·	1.4 km	MPC · JPL
805899	2016 JG_{28}	—	February 5, 2016	Haleakala	Pan-STARRS 1	·	1.5 km	MPC · JPL
805900	2016 JJ_{29}	—	February 5, 2016	Haleakala	Pan-STARRS 1	·	2.1 km	MPC · JPL

== 805901–806000 ==
back to top

Designation			Discovery			Properties		Ref
Permanent	Provisional	Named after	Date	Site	Discoverer(s)	Category	Diam.	Ref
805901	2016 JO_{31}	—	June 9, 2007	Kitt Peak	Spacewatch	·	1.3 km	MPC · JPL
805902	2016 JZ_{32}	—	February 10, 2016	Haleakala	Pan-STARRS 1	·	1.3 km	MPC · JPL
805903	2016 JO_{34}	—	February 5, 2016	Haleakala	Pan-STARRS 1	·	1.5 km	MPC · JPL
805904	2016 JX_{39}	—	April 15, 2016	Mount Lemmon	Mount Lemmon Survey	·	1.7 km	MPC · JPL
805905	2016 JJ_{41}	—	March 29, 2011	Mount Lemmon	Mount Lemmon Survey	EUN	840 m	MPC · JPL
805906	2016 JD_{43}	—	May 1, 2016	Haleakala	Pan-STARRS 1	·	1.3 km	MPC · JPL
805907	2016 JO_{46}	—	May 4, 2016	Haleakala	Pan-STARRS 1	·	1.2 km	MPC · JPL
805908	2016 JV_{47}	—	May 1, 2016	Haleakala	Pan-STARRS 1	·	1.2 km	MPC · JPL
805909	2016 JW_{47}	—	May 3, 2016	Mount Lemmon	Mount Lemmon Survey	·	1.4 km	MPC · JPL
805910	2016 JV_{49}	—	May 2, 2016	Mount Lemmon	Mount Lemmon Survey	·	1.5 km	MPC · JPL
805911	2016 JU_{51}	—	May 4, 2016	Kitt Peak	Spacewatch	·	2.0 km	MPC · JPL
805912	2016 JY_{51}	—	May 7, 2016	Haleakala	Pan-STARRS 1	DOR	1.9 km	MPC · JPL
805913	2016 JS_{52}	—	January 22, 2015	Haleakala	Pan-STARRS 1	·	1.1 km	MPC · JPL
805914	2016 JP_{53}	—	May 1, 2016	Haleakala	Pan-STARRS 1	·	930 m	MPC · JPL
805915	2016 JJ_{60}	—	May 1, 2016	Cerro Tololo	DECam	·	1.2 km	MPC · JPL
805916	2016 JA_{63}	—	May 1, 2016	Cerro Tololo	DECam	·	1.5 km	MPC · JPL
805917	2016 JZ_{64}	—	September 9, 2008	Mount Lemmon	Mount Lemmon Survey	HOF	1.9 km	MPC · JPL
805918	2016 JZ_{65}	—	May 1, 2016	Cerro Tololo	DECam	L4	5.0 km	MPC · JPL
805919	2016 JC_{66}	—	May 1, 2016	Cerro Tololo	DECam	·	1.3 km	MPC · JPL
805920	2016 JR_{70}	—	January 16, 2015	Haleakala	Pan-STARRS 1	·	1.5 km	MPC · JPL
805921	2016 JA_{71}	—	January 26, 2015	Haleakala	Pan-STARRS 1	·	1.2 km	MPC · JPL
805922	2016 JC_{72}	—	May 7, 2016	Haleakala	Pan-STARRS 1	HOF	1.6 km	MPC · JPL
805923	2016 JU_{72}	—	May 1, 2016	Cerro Tololo	DECam	WIT	640 m	MPC · JPL
805924	2016 JA_{73}	—	May 3, 2016	Mount Lemmon	Mount Lemmon Survey	·	1.4 km	MPC · JPL
805925	2016 JX_{73}	—	April 22, 2007	Kitt Peak	Spacewatch	·	1.3 km	MPC · JPL
805926	2016 JK_{75}	—	May 1, 2016	Cerro Tololo	DECam	·	1.3 km	MPC · JPL
805927	2016 JR_{77}	—	December 29, 2014	Haleakala	Pan-STARRS 1	·	1.1 km	MPC · JPL
805928	2016 JW_{77}	—	May 1, 2016	Cerro Tololo	DECam	L4	5.1 km	MPC · JPL
805929	2016 JY_{78}	—	May 1, 2016	Cerro Tololo	DECam	·	1.3 km	MPC · JPL
805930	2016 JG_{81}	—	May 1, 2016	Cerro Tololo	DECam	THM	1.6 km	MPC · JPL
805931	2016 JC_{82}	—	May 1, 2016	Haleakala	Pan-STARRS 1	·	2.0 km	MPC · JPL
805932	2016 JF_{82}	—	May 1, 2016	Cerro Tololo	DECam	·	1.5 km	MPC · JPL
805933	2016 JJ_{83}	—	May 1, 2016	Cerro Tololo	DECam	·	1.6 km	MPC · JPL
805934	2016 JP_{94}	—	May 3, 2016	Cerro Tololo	DECam	·	2.3 km	MPC · JPL
805935	2016 JW_{104}	—	May 1, 2016	Cerro Tololo	DECam	·	1.2 km	MPC · JPL
805936	2016 KA_{1}	—	May 29, 2016	Haleakala	Pan-STARRS 1	AMO	230 m	MPC · JPL
805937	2016 KU_{3}	—	January 8, 2016	Haleakala	Pan-STARRS 1	·	1.8 km	MPC · JPL
805938	2016 KH_{5}	—	September 27, 2008	Mount Lemmon	Mount Lemmon Survey	·	1.2 km	MPC · JPL
805939	2016 KW_{5}	—	February 4, 2006	Kitt Peak	Spacewatch	·	1.3 km	MPC · JPL
805940	2016 KH_{6}	—	June 10, 2007	Kitt Peak	Spacewatch	·	1.4 km	MPC · JPL
805941	2016 KL_{7}	—	September 3, 2010	Mount Lemmon	Mount Lemmon Survey	·	500 m	MPC · JPL
805942	2016 KS_{9}	—	May 30, 2016	Haleakala	Pan-STARRS 1	AGN	780 m	MPC · JPL
805943	2016 KK_{10}	—	August 29, 2005	Kitt Peak	Spacewatch	·	2.2 km	MPC · JPL
805944	2016 KN_{11}	—	May 30, 2016	Haleakala	Pan-STARRS 1	·	1.4 km	MPC · JPL
805945	2016 LH_{4}	—	February 22, 2011	Kitt Peak	Spacewatch	·	1.2 km	MPC · JPL
805946	2016 LA_{5}	—	March 17, 2016	Haleakala	Pan-STARRS 1	TIR	1.8 km	MPC · JPL
805947	2016 LB_{6}	—	May 5, 2016	Mount Lemmon	Mount Lemmon Survey	·	1.4 km	MPC · JPL
805948	2016 LL_{6}	—	May 7, 2011	Kitt Peak	Spacewatch	·	1.7 km	MPC · JPL
805949	2016 LZ_{6}	—	January 28, 2015	Haleakala	Pan-STARRS 1	EOS	1.6 km	MPC · JPL
805950	2016 LC_{15}	—	August 26, 2012	Haleakala	Pan-STARRS 1	·	1.4 km	MPC · JPL
805951	2016 LV_{17}	—	November 20, 2014	Haleakala	Pan-STARRS 1	·	1.2 km	MPC · JPL
805952	2016 LK_{18}	—	May 15, 2016	Haleakala	Pan-STARRS 1	·	1.4 km	MPC · JPL
805953	2016 LY_{18}	—	June 5, 2016	Haleakala	Pan-STARRS 1	·	1.4 km	MPC · JPL
805954	2016 LY_{21}	—	January 20, 2015	Haleakala	Pan-STARRS 1	·	1.5 km	MPC · JPL
805955	2016 LY_{22}	—	February 14, 2015	Mount Lemmon	Mount Lemmon Survey	EOS	1.4 km	MPC · JPL
805956	2016 LP_{25}	—	March 5, 2011	Kitt Peak	Spacewatch	·	1.2 km	MPC · JPL
805957	2016 LX_{28}	—	September 18, 2012	Mount Lemmon	Mount Lemmon Survey	·	1.0 km	MPC · JPL
805958	2016 LD_{29}	—	June 4, 2016	Mount Lemmon	Mount Lemmon Survey	·	1.6 km	MPC · JPL
805959	2016 LJ_{29}	—	September 21, 1998	Kitt Peak	Spacewatch	·	1.3 km	MPC · JPL
805960	2016 LE_{33}	—	October 19, 2003	Sacramento Peak	SDSS	(13314)	1.4 km	MPC · JPL
805961	2016 LX_{33}	—	June 5, 2016	Haleakala	Pan-STARRS 1	EOS	1.2 km	MPC · JPL
805962	2016 LB_{36}	—	May 30, 2016	Haleakala	Pan-STARRS 1	·	2.0 km	MPC · JPL
805963	2016 LE_{37}	—	February 4, 2006	Kitt Peak	Spacewatch	·	1.3 km	MPC · JPL
805964	2016 LN_{37}	—	May 30, 2016	Haleakala	Pan-STARRS 1	·	2.0 km	MPC · JPL
805965	2016 LT_{37}	—	June 5, 2016	Haleakala	Pan-STARRS 1	·	2.3 km	MPC · JPL
805966	2016 LU_{37}	—	June 5, 2016	Haleakala	Pan-STARRS 1	·	1.4 km	MPC · JPL
805967	2016 LN_{40}	—	June 3, 2016	ESA OGS	ESA OGS	·	1.2 km	MPC · JPL
805968	2016 LH_{46}	—	March 30, 2016	Haleakala	Pan-STARRS 1	·	1.6 km	MPC · JPL
805969	2016 LG_{54}	—	June 5, 2016	Haleakala	Pan-STARRS 1	T_{j} (2.96)	3.0 km	MPC · JPL
805970	2016 LY_{55}	—	June 5, 2016	Haleakala	Pan-STARRS 1	·	1.1 km	MPC · JPL
805971	2016 LQ_{58}	—	October 19, 2006	Catalina	CSS	·	2.2 km	MPC · JPL
805972	2016 LR_{59}	—	February 20, 2015	Haleakala	Pan-STARRS 1	·	1.5 km	MPC · JPL
805973	2016 LE_{60}	—	November 14, 2012	Kitt Peak	Spacewatch	·	2.0 km	MPC · JPL
805974	2016 LP_{60}	—	April 23, 2015	Haleakala	Pan-STARRS 1	·	2.1 km	MPC · JPL
805975	2016 LU_{61}	—	April 23, 2015	Haleakala	Pan-STARRS 1	·	2.1 km	MPC · JPL
805976	2016 LR_{62}	—	April 24, 2015	Haleakala	Pan-STARRS 1	EOS	1.4 km	MPC · JPL
805977	2016 LB_{63}	—	April 23, 2015	Haleakala	Pan-STARRS 1	EOS	1.3 km	MPC · JPL
805978	2016 LH_{63}	—	April 13, 2015	Haleakala	Pan-STARRS 1	·	1.5 km	MPC · JPL
805979	2016 LU_{67}	—	June 5, 2016	Haleakala	Pan-STARRS 1	·	1.9 km	MPC · JPL
805980	2016 LS_{70}	—	August 6, 2007	Lulin	LUSS	·	1.6 km	MPC · JPL
805981	2016 LZ_{70}	—	June 4, 2016	Mount Lemmon	Mount Lemmon Survey	·	2.0 km	MPC · JPL
805982	2016 LV_{71}	—	September 2, 2005	Palomar Mountain	NEAT	·	2.2 km	MPC · JPL
805983	2016 LW_{75}	—	June 5, 2016	Haleakala	Pan-STARRS 1	·	2.8 km	MPC · JPL
805984	2016 LT_{76}	—	June 5, 2016	Haleakala	Pan-STARRS 1	·	1.1 km	MPC · JPL
805985	2016 LX_{79}	—	June 8, 2016	Mount Lemmon	Mount Lemmon Survey	·	910 m	MPC · JPL
805986	2016 LS_{82}	—	June 7, 2016	Haleakala	Pan-STARRS 1	·	1.4 km	MPC · JPL
805987	2016 LA_{85}	—	June 8, 2016	Haleakala	Pan-STARRS 1	·	1.5 km	MPC · JPL
805988	2016 LV_{85}	—	June 8, 2016	Haleakala	Pan-STARRS 1	·	1.3 km	MPC · JPL
805989	2016 LP_{87}	—	June 7, 2016	Haleakala	Pan-STARRS 1	·	2.0 km	MPC · JPL
805990	2016 LJ_{88}	—	June 5, 2016	Haleakala	Pan-STARRS 1	·	1.8 km	MPC · JPL
805991	2016 LO_{91}	—	June 3, 2016	Haleakala	Pan-STARRS 1	·	1.6 km	MPC · JPL
805992	2016 LR_{92}	—	January 20, 2015	Haleakala	Pan-STARRS 1	·	1.3 km	MPC · JPL
805993	2016 LT_{92}	—	June 12, 2016	Mount Lemmon	Mount Lemmon Survey	·	1.5 km	MPC · JPL
805994	2016 LV_{92}	—	June 5, 2016	Haleakala	Pan-STARRS 1	·	1.2 km	MPC · JPL
805995	2016 LD_{101}	—	June 8, 2016	Haleakala	Pan-STARRS 1	EOS	1.3 km	MPC · JPL
805996	2016 LW_{101}	—	June 5, 2016	Haleakala	Pan-STARRS 1	·	1.4 km	MPC · JPL
805997 Wolszczan	2016 LL_{106}	Wolszczan	June 12, 2016	Mauna Kea	COIAS	·	1.2 km	MPC · JPL
805998 Yunon	2016 LM_{106}	Yunon	June 11, 2016	Mauna Kea	COIAS	·	1.4 km	MPC · JPL
805999	2016 MP	—	May 5, 2016	Haleakala	Pan-STARRS 1	·	2.0 km	MPC · JPL
806000	2016 MB_{5}	—	June 28, 2016	Haleakala	Pan-STARRS 1	·	1.6 km	MPC · JPL

back to top

== Meaning of names ==
As minor planet discoveries are confirmed, they are given a permanent number by the IAU's Minor Planet Center (MPC), and the discoverers can then submit names for them, following the IAU's naming conventions. The list below concerns those minor planets in the specified number-range that have received names, and explains the meanings of those names.

Official naming citations of newly named small Solar System bodies are approved and published in a bulletin by IAU's Working Group for Small Bodies Nomenclature (WGSBN). Before May 2021, citations were published in MPC's Minor Planet Circulars for many decades. Recent citations can also be found on the JPL Small-Body Database (SBDB). Until his death in 2016, German astronomer Lutz D. Schmadel compiled these citations into the Dictionary of Minor Planet Names (DMP) and regularly updated the collection.

Based on Paul Herget's The Names of the Minor Planets, Schmadel also researched the unclear origin of numerous asteroids, most of which had been named prior to World War II. This article incorporates text from this source, which is in the public domain: SBDB New namings may only be added to this list below after official publication as the preannouncement of names is condemned. The WGSBN publishes a comprehensive guideline for the naming rules of non-cometary small Solar System bodies.

Named minor planet	Provisional	This minor planet was named for...	Ref · Catalog
805212 Junkes	2016 CA_{389}	Joseph Junkes, S.J., a German Jesuit astronomer, served as Assistant (from 1935) and later Director (from 1953) of the Specola Vaticana's Astrophysical Laboratory.	IAU · 805212
805997 Wolszczan	2016 LL_{106}	Description available (see ref). Please summarize in your own words.	IAU · 805997
805998 Yunon	2016 LM_{106}	Nagayama Yunon, Japanese manga artist and the author of the comic Hatsukoi Rail Trip.	IAU · 805998
