= List of minor planets: 814001–815000 =

The following is a partial list of minor planets, running from minor-planet number 814001 through 815000, inclusive. The primary data for this and other partial lists is based on JPL's "Small-Body Orbital Elements" and data available from the Minor Planet Center. Critical list information is also provided by the MPC, unless otherwise specified from Lowell Observatory. A detailed description of the table's columns and additional sources are given on the main page including a complete list of every page in this series, and a statistical break-up on the dynamical classification of minor planets.

Also see the summary list of all named bodies in numerical and alphabetical order, and the corresponding naming citations for the number range of this particular list. New namings may only be added to this list after official publication, as the preannouncement of names is condemned by the Working Group for Small Bodies Nomenclature of the International Astronomical Union.

Near-Earth obj.	MBA (inner)	MBA (outer)	Centaur
Mars-crosser	MBA (middle)	Jupiter trojan	Trans-Neptunian obj.
Unclassified

== 814001–814100 ==
Designation			Discovery			Properties		Ref
Permanent	Provisional	Named after	Date	Site	Discoverer(s)	Category	Diam.	Ref
814001	2007 XD_{63}	—	September 6, 2016	Mount Lemmon	Mount Lemmon Survey	·	1.6 km	MPC · JPL
814002	2007 XV_{63}	—	June 18, 2013	Haleakala	Pan-STARRS 1	·	510 m	MPC · JPL
814003	2007 XD_{65}	—	March 26, 2009	Kitt Peak	Spacewatch	·	1.3 km	MPC · JPL
814004	2007 XT_{65}	—	April 2, 2016	Haleakala	Pan-STARRS 1	·	570 m	MPC · JPL
814005	2007 XT_{67}	—	September 30, 2013	Mount Lemmon	Mount Lemmon Survey	·	550 m	MPC · JPL
814006	2007 XJ_{70}	—	December 6, 2007	Mount Lemmon	Mount Lemmon Survey	WIT	700 m	MPC · JPL
814007	2007 XO_{70}	—	December 4, 2007	Mount Lemmon	Mount Lemmon Survey	·	1.1 km	MPC · JPL
814008	2007 XX_{71}	—	December 14, 2007	Mount Lemmon	Mount Lemmon Survey	H	390 m	MPC · JPL
814009	2007 YX_{32}	—	December 18, 2007	Kitt Peak	Spacewatch	PHO	770 m	MPC · JPL
814010	2007 YP_{37}	—	December 30, 2007	Mount Lemmon	Mount Lemmon Survey	PHO	940 m	MPC · JPL
814011	2007 YM_{49}	—	December 17, 2007	Kitt Peak	Spacewatch	NYS	670 m	MPC · JPL
814012	2007 YN_{57}	—	December 28, 2007	Kitt Peak	Spacewatch	·	750 m	MPC · JPL
814013	2007 YQ_{60}	—	December 30, 2007	Catalina	CSS	·	1.1 km	MPC · JPL
814014	2007 YZ_{75}	—	December 16, 2007	Catalina	CSS	·	3.4 km	MPC · JPL
814015	2007 YK_{79}	—	December 19, 2007	Kitt Peak	Spacewatch	DOR	2.0 km	MPC · JPL
814016	2007 YK_{81}	—	February 16, 2015	Haleakala	Pan-STARRS 1	·	510 m	MPC · JPL
814017	2007 YW_{81}	—	December 18, 2007	Kitt Peak	Spacewatch	H	410 m	MPC · JPL
814018	2007 YZ_{81}	—	November 20, 2014	Haleakala	Pan-STARRS 1	NYS	860 m	MPC · JPL
814019	2007 YU_{82}	—	June 26, 2014	Haleakala	Pan-STARRS 1	NYS	1 km	MPC · JPL
814020	2007 YE_{88}	—	January 29, 2015	Haleakala	Pan-STARRS 1	·	540 m	MPC · JPL
814021	2007 YG_{95}	—	December 18, 2007	Mount Lemmon	Mount Lemmon Survey	·	810 m	MPC · JPL
814022	2007 YR_{96}	—	December 30, 2007	Mount Lemmon	Mount Lemmon Survey	·	800 m	MPC · JPL
814023	2007 YT_{96}	—	December 16, 2007	Mount Lemmon	Mount Lemmon Survey	·	500 m	MPC · JPL
814024	2007 YE_{97}	—	December 31, 2007	Mount Lemmon	Mount Lemmon Survey	·	1.6 km	MPC · JPL
814025	2008 AV_{12}	—	January 10, 2008	Mount Lemmon	Mount Lemmon Survey	·	740 m	MPC · JPL
814026	2008 AV_{16}	—	December 30, 2007	Kitt Peak	Spacewatch	·	930 m	MPC · JPL
814027	2008 AU_{19}	—	January 10, 2008	Mount Lemmon	Mount Lemmon Survey	·	590 m	MPC · JPL
814028	2008 AL_{25}	—	January 10, 2008	Mount Lemmon	Mount Lemmon Survey	H	480 m	MPC · JPL
814029	2008 AD_{33}	—	December 14, 2007	Mount Lemmon	Mount Lemmon Survey	·	800 m	MPC · JPL
814030	2008 AO_{47}	—	December 20, 2007	Kitt Peak	Spacewatch	·	1.5 km	MPC · JPL
814031	2008 AP_{48}	—	November 2, 2007	Kitt Peak	Spacewatch	EUN	890 m	MPC · JPL
814032	2008 AD_{50}	—	January 1, 2008	Kitt Peak	Spacewatch	·	1.1 km	MPC · JPL
814033	2008 AQ_{51}	—	January 11, 2008	Kitt Peak	Spacewatch	H	350 m	MPC · JPL
814034	2008 AE_{56}	—	January 11, 2008	Kitt Peak	Spacewatch	·	470 m	MPC · JPL
814035	2008 AR_{58}	—	March 3, 2005	Catalina	CSS	·	540 m	MPC · JPL
814036	2008 AW_{78}	—	January 12, 2008	Kitt Peak	Spacewatch	·	1.8 km	MPC · JPL
814037	2008 AG_{81}	—	January 12, 2008	Kitt Peak	Spacewatch	·	560 m	MPC · JPL
814038	2008 AQ_{88}	—	February 13, 2004	Kitt Peak	Spacewatch	·	720 m	MPC · JPL
814039	2008 AX_{102}	—	December 31, 2007	Mount Lemmon	Mount Lemmon Survey	·	670 m	MPC · JPL
814040	2008 AW_{139}	—	January 13, 2008	Mount Lemmon	Mount Lemmon Survey	H	370 m	MPC · JPL
814041	2008 AL_{141}	—	January 17, 2013	Haleakala	Pan-STARRS 1	·	1.5 km	MPC · JPL
814042	2008 AF_{145}	—	December 19, 2007	Mount Lemmon	Mount Lemmon Survey	·	1.5 km	MPC · JPL
814043	2008 AG_{148}	—	March 26, 2014	Mount Lemmon	Mount Lemmon Survey	·	1.7 km	MPC · JPL
814044	2008 AV_{150}	—	January 15, 2008	Mount Lemmon	Mount Lemmon Survey	NYS	740 m	MPC · JPL
814045	2008 AR_{151}	—	January 13, 2008	Kitt Peak	Spacewatch	H	360 m	MPC · JPL
814046	2008 AU_{153}	—	January 1, 2008	Kitt Peak	Spacewatch	·	560 m	MPC · JPL
814047	2008 AB_{154}	—	January 11, 2008	Kitt Peak	Spacewatch	·	920 m	MPC · JPL
814048	2008 AR_{154}	—	December 30, 2007	Mount Lemmon	Mount Lemmon Survey	MAS	450 m	MPC · JPL
814049	2008 AT_{155}	—	January 10, 2008	Kitt Peak	Spacewatch	EOS	1.4 km	MPC · JPL
814050	2008 AY_{156}	—	January 10, 2008	Mount Lemmon	Mount Lemmon Survey	KON	1.6 km	MPC · JPL
814051	2008 AZ_{157}	—	January 14, 2008	Kitt Peak	Spacewatch	·	1.0 km	MPC · JPL
814052	2008 AG_{159}	—	January 11, 2008	Kitt Peak	Spacewatch	·	890 m	MPC · JPL
814053	2008 AR_{159}	—	January 12, 2008	Kitt Peak	Spacewatch	·	1.5 km	MPC · JPL
814054	2008 BH_{25}	—	December 18, 2007	Mount Lemmon	Mount Lemmon Survey	H	410 m	MPC · JPL
814055	2008 BC_{27}	—	January 30, 2008	Mount Lemmon	Mount Lemmon Survey	·	2.1 km	MPC · JPL
814056	2008 BM_{49}	—	January 30, 2008	Mount Lemmon	Mount Lemmon Survey	·	690 m	MPC · JPL
814057	2008 BQ_{49}	—	January 30, 2008	Mount Lemmon	Mount Lemmon Survey	·	1.4 km	MPC · JPL
814058	2008 BK_{52}	—	January 20, 2008	Mount Lemmon	Mount Lemmon Survey	H	470 m	MPC · JPL
814059	2008 BG_{56}	—	January 18, 2008	Kitt Peak	Spacewatch	·	490 m	MPC · JPL
814060	2008 BH_{60}	—	January 18, 2008	Kitt Peak	Spacewatch	(5)	700 m	MPC · JPL
814061	2008 BA_{61}	—	January 30, 2008	Mount Lemmon	Mount Lemmon Survey	·	960 m	MPC · JPL
814062	2008 BP_{62}	—	January 30, 2008	Mount Lemmon	Mount Lemmon Survey	·	430 m	MPC · JPL
814063	2008 CZ	—	February 2, 2008	Schärding	Gierlinger, R.	·	770 m	MPC · JPL
814064	2008 CW_{9}	—	February 2, 2008	Mount Lemmon	Mount Lemmon Survey	·	1.4 km	MPC · JPL
814065	2008 CR_{10}	—	January 11, 2008	Kitt Peak	Spacewatch	·	1.2 km	MPC · JPL
814066	2008 CV_{21}	—	February 8, 2008	Kitt Peak	Spacewatch	·	400 m	MPC · JPL
814067	2008 CO_{31}	—	February 2, 2008	Kitt Peak	Spacewatch	(5)	700 m	MPC · JPL
814068	2008 CW_{31}	—	February 2, 2008	Kitt Peak	Spacewatch	AGN	850 m	MPC · JPL
814069	2008 CM_{36}	—	February 2, 2008	Kitt Peak	Spacewatch	·	470 m	MPC · JPL
814070	2008 CY_{37}	—	February 2, 2008	Kitt Peak	Spacewatch	·	1.8 km	MPC · JPL
814071	2008 CM_{40}	—	January 10, 2008	Kitt Peak	Spacewatch	·	880 m	MPC · JPL
814072	2008 CC_{42}	—	February 2, 2008	Kitt Peak	Spacewatch	·	560 m	MPC · JPL
814073	2008 CT_{64}	—	April 11, 2005	Kitt Peak	Spacewatch	·	500 m	MPC · JPL
814074	2008 CJ_{66}	—	February 8, 2008	Mount Lemmon	Mount Lemmon Survey	·	530 m	MPC · JPL
814075	2008 CB_{79}	—	September 15, 2006	Kitt Peak	Spacewatch	·	1.3 km	MPC · JPL
814076	2008 CN_{82}	—	March 10, 2005	Mount Lemmon	Mount Lemmon Survey	·	510 m	MPC · JPL
814077	2008 CN_{94}	—	February 8, 2008	Mount Lemmon	Mount Lemmon Survey	·	870 m	MPC · JPL
814078	2008 CG_{101}	—	February 9, 2008	Mount Lemmon	Mount Lemmon Survey	·	510 m	MPC · JPL
814079	2008 CF_{108}	—	January 15, 2008	Mount Lemmon	Mount Lemmon Survey	(1547)	1.2 km	MPC · JPL
814080	2008 CC_{110}	—	February 9, 2008	Kitt Peak	Spacewatch	PHO	640 m	MPC · JPL
814081	2008 CU_{134}	—	January 10, 2008	Kitt Peak	Spacewatch	BRA	1.1 km	MPC · JPL
814082	2008 CZ_{140}	—	February 8, 2008	Kitt Peak	Spacewatch	·	1.8 km	MPC · JPL
814083	2008 CK_{141}	—	January 10, 2008	Mount Lemmon	Mount Lemmon Survey	·	1.4 km	MPC · JPL
814084	2008 CT_{148}	—	October 22, 1995	Kitt Peak	Spacewatch	·	830 m	MPC · JPL
814085	2008 CU_{169}	—	February 12, 2008	Mount Lemmon	Mount Lemmon Survey	H	410 m	MPC · JPL
814086	2008 CQ_{174}	—	February 13, 2008	Mount Lemmon	Mount Lemmon Survey	H	430 m	MPC · JPL
814087	2008 CS_{182}	—	February 11, 2008	Mount Lemmon	Mount Lemmon Survey	·	860 m	MPC · JPL
814088	2008 CW_{183}	—	February 13, 2008	Mount Lemmon	Mount Lemmon Survey	·	1.6 km	MPC · JPL
814089	2008 CA_{194}	—	February 9, 2008	Kitt Peak	Spacewatch	·	1.5 km	MPC · JPL
814090	2008 CJ_{204}	—	February 13, 2008	Mount Lemmon	Mount Lemmon Survey	(5)	940 m	MPC · JPL
814091	2008 CY_{217}	—	February 8, 2008	Mount Lemmon	Mount Lemmon Survey	·	1.6 km	MPC · JPL
814092	2008 CF_{218}	—	February 2, 2008	Kitt Peak	Spacewatch	·	910 m	MPC · JPL
814093	2008 CM_{223}	—	October 10, 2010	Kitt Peak	Spacewatch	·	840 m	MPC · JPL
814094	2008 CY_{224}	—	February 9, 2008	Mount Lemmon	Mount Lemmon Survey	·	490 m	MPC · JPL
814095	2008 CC_{226}	—	October 14, 2010	Mount Lemmon	Mount Lemmon Survey	·	820 m	MPC · JPL
814096	2008 CS_{226}	—	November 13, 2010	Mount Lemmon	Mount Lemmon Survey	·	490 m	MPC · JPL
814097	2008 CY_{226}	—	February 13, 2008	Kitt Peak	Spacewatch	·	530 m	MPC · JPL
814098	2008 CW_{227}	—	February 8, 2008	Kitt Peak	Spacewatch	MAR	620 m	MPC · JPL
814099	2008 CM_{230}	—	September 4, 2010	Mount Lemmon	Mount Lemmon Survey	·	1.7 km	MPC · JPL
814100	2008 CW_{230}	—	January 3, 2013	Mount Lemmon	Mount Lemmon Survey	·	1.5 km	MPC · JPL

== 814101–814200 ==
back to top

Designation			Discovery			Properties		Ref
Permanent	Provisional	Named after	Date	Site	Discoverer(s)	Category	Diam.	Ref
814101	2008 CX_{232}	—	February 11, 2008	Mount Lemmon	Mount Lemmon Survey	·	360 m	MPC · JPL
814102	2008 CP_{233}	—	December 14, 2010	Mount Lemmon	Mount Lemmon Survey	·	610 m	MPC · JPL
814103	2008 CK_{234}	—	February 8, 2008	Kitt Peak	Spacewatch	·	470 m	MPC · JPL
814104	2008 CV_{234}	—	July 11, 2016	Haleakala	Pan-STARRS 1	·	470 m	MPC · JPL
814105	2008 CP_{237}	—	October 2, 2013	Mount Lemmon	Mount Lemmon Survey	·	430 m	MPC · JPL
814106	2008 CF_{239}	—	February 2, 2008	Kitt Peak	Spacewatch	·	480 m	MPC · JPL
814107	2008 CZ_{240}	—	February 9, 2008	Kitt Peak	Spacewatch	H	370 m	MPC · JPL
814108	2008 CC_{241}	—	February 8, 2008	Kitt Peak	Spacewatch	RAF	630 m	MPC · JPL
814109	2008 CT_{242}	—	February 10, 2008	Mount Lemmon	Mount Lemmon Survey	·	1.2 km	MPC · JPL
814110	2008 CN_{245}	—	February 1, 2008	Mount Lemmon	Mount Lemmon Survey	·	1.5 km	MPC · JPL
814111	2008 CQ_{247}	—	February 12, 2008	Mount Lemmon	Mount Lemmon Survey	·	800 m	MPC · JPL
814112	2008 CB_{248}	—	February 10, 2008	Kitt Peak	Spacewatch	·	930 m	MPC · JPL
814113	2008 CQ_{248}	—	February 8, 2008	Kitt Peak	Spacewatch	·	990 m	MPC · JPL
814114	2008 CA_{249}	—	February 9, 2008	Kitt Peak	Spacewatch	·	910 m	MPC · JPL
814115	2008 CJ_{250}	—	February 9, 2008	Kitt Peak	Spacewatch	EUN	880 m	MPC · JPL
814116	2008 CP_{253}	—	February 10, 2008	Kitt Peak	Spacewatch	·	1.9 km	MPC · JPL
814117	2008 DE_{8}	—	February 2, 2008	Kitt Peak	Spacewatch	·	2.1 km	MPC · JPL
814118	2008 DP_{16}	—	February 27, 2008	Mount Lemmon	Mount Lemmon Survey	PHO	700 m	MPC · JPL
814119	2008 DC_{17}	—	February 27, 2008	Mount Lemmon	Mount Lemmon Survey	DOR	1.7 km	MPC · JPL
814120	2008 DT_{31}	—	February 27, 2008	Kitt Peak	Spacewatch	·	680 m	MPC · JPL
814121	2008 DG_{52}	—	February 29, 2008	Mount Lemmon	Mount Lemmon Survey	·	490 m	MPC · JPL
814122	2008 DT_{62}	—	May 17, 2005	Mount Lemmon	Mount Lemmon Survey	·	510 m	MPC · JPL
814123	2008 DQ_{63}	—	February 7, 2008	Kitt Peak	Spacewatch	·	550 m	MPC · JPL
814124	2008 DL_{65}	—	February 10, 2008	Kitt Peak	Spacewatch	·	1.9 km	MPC · JPL
814125	2008 DM_{74}	—	February 8, 2008	Kitt Peak	Spacewatch	·	590 m	MPC · JPL
814126	2008 DB_{86}	—	February 26, 2008	Mount Lemmon	Mount Lemmon Survey	·	540 m	MPC · JPL
814127	2008 DG_{91}	—	February 28, 2008	Mount Lemmon	Mount Lemmon Survey	·	1.5 km	MPC · JPL
814128	2008 DL_{91}	—	February 18, 2008	Mount Lemmon	Mount Lemmon Survey	·	540 m	MPC · JPL
814129	2008 DH_{92}	—	February 28, 2008	Mount Lemmon	Mount Lemmon Survey	·	610 m	MPC · JPL
814130	2008 DY_{92}	—	September 26, 2009	Mount Lemmon	Mount Lemmon Survey	·	560 m	MPC · JPL
814131	2008 DD_{93}	—	February 28, 2008	Mount Lemmon	Mount Lemmon Survey	·	540 m	MPC · JPL
814132	2008 DJ_{97}	—	February 27, 2008	Mount Lemmon	Mount Lemmon Survey	·	550 m	MPC · JPL
814133	2008 DN_{100}	—	February 28, 2008	Mount Lemmon	Mount Lemmon Survey	·	1.6 km	MPC · JPL
814134	2008 EV_{4}	—	March 2, 2008	Mount Lemmon	Mount Lemmon Survey	·	620 m	MPC · JPL
814135	2008 EQ_{13}	—	March 1, 2008	Kitt Peak	Spacewatch	·	600 m	MPC · JPL
814136	2008 EP_{46}	—	March 5, 2008	Mount Lemmon	Mount Lemmon Survey	H	390 m	MPC · JPL
814137	2008 ED_{49}	—	February 9, 2008	Kitt Peak	Spacewatch	KOR	1.4 km	MPC · JPL
814138	2008 EM_{50}	—	February 28, 2008	Mount Lemmon	Mount Lemmon Survey	·	740 m	MPC · JPL
814139	2008 EH_{57}	—	January 11, 2008	Mount Lemmon	Mount Lemmon Survey	·	1.7 km	MPC · JPL
814140	2008 EZ_{62}	—	March 9, 2008	Mount Lemmon	Mount Lemmon Survey	·	1.1 km	MPC · JPL
814141	2008 EW_{64}	—	March 9, 2008	Mount Lemmon	Mount Lemmon Survey	·	670 m	MPC · JPL
814142	2008 EB_{66}	—	March 9, 2008	Mount Lemmon	Mount Lemmon Survey	·	690 m	MPC · JPL
814143	2008 EU_{129}	—	March 11, 2008	Kitt Peak	Spacewatch	·	480 m	MPC · JPL
814144	2008 ET_{130}	—	March 11, 2008	Kitt Peak	Spacewatch	·	580 m	MPC · JPL
814145	2008 EJ_{132}	—	March 11, 2008	Catalina	CSS	·	440 m	MPC · JPL
814146	2008 EO_{142}	—	March 12, 2008	Mount Lemmon	Mount Lemmon Survey	·	1.3 km	MPC · JPL
814147 Vladturcu	2008 EB_{145}	Vladturcu	March 11, 2008	La Silla	EURONEAR	·	2.1 km	MPC · JPL
814148 Alexandrupop	2008 EW_{154}	Alexandrupop	March 11, 2008	La Silla	EURONEAR	·	510 m	MPC · JPL
814149	2008 EG_{158}	—	March 6, 2008	Mount Lemmon	Mount Lemmon Survey	·	1.1 km	MPC · JPL
814150	2008 EM_{173}	—	September 10, 2010	Kitt Peak	Spacewatch	·	710 m	MPC · JPL
814151	2008 EH_{176}	—	January 10, 2013	Haleakala	Pan-STARRS 1	·	1.7 km	MPC · JPL
814152	2008 EM_{176}	—	March 12, 2008	Kitt Peak	Spacewatch	PHO	630 m	MPC · JPL
814153	2008 EA_{177}	—	March 4, 2008	Mount Lemmon	Mount Lemmon Survey	·	520 m	MPC · JPL
814154	2008 EC_{177}	—	March 1, 2008	Mount Lemmon	Mount Lemmon Survey	HNS	720 m	MPC · JPL
814155	2008 EY_{178}	—	March 11, 2008	Mount Lemmon	Mount Lemmon Survey	·	850 m	MPC · JPL
814156	2008 EY_{179}	—	November 6, 2010	Kitt Peak	Spacewatch	·	500 m	MPC · JPL
814157	2008 EY_{184}	—	September 19, 2017	Haleakala	Pan-STARRS 1	·	720 m	MPC · JPL
814158	2008 EP_{186}	—	August 3, 2016	Haleakala	Pan-STARRS 1	·	590 m	MPC · JPL
814159	2008 EM_{188}	—	April 14, 2015	Mount Lemmon	Mount Lemmon Survey	·	500 m	MPC · JPL
814160	2008 EL_{193}	—	March 12, 2008	Mount Lemmon	Mount Lemmon Survey	·	630 m	MPC · JPL
814161	2008 EE_{195}	—	March 15, 2008	Mount Lemmon	Mount Lemmon Survey	·	990 m	MPC · JPL
814162	2008 EH_{195}	—	March 13, 2008	Kitt Peak	Spacewatch	·	740 m	MPC · JPL
814163	2008 EM_{195}	—	March 8, 2008	Mount Lemmon	Mount Lemmon Survey	·	1.8 km	MPC · JPL
814164	2008 EV_{196}	—	March 8, 2008	Mount Lemmon	Mount Lemmon Survey	MAS	520 m	MPC · JPL
814165	2008 EG_{198}	—	March 13, 2008	Mount Lemmon	Mount Lemmon Survey	·	1.6 km	MPC · JPL
814166	2008 FV_{3}	—	February 10, 2008	Kitt Peak	Spacewatch	·	860 m	MPC · JPL
814167	2008 FL_{12}	—	February 8, 2008	Kitt Peak	Spacewatch	·	520 m	MPC · JPL
814168	2008 FG_{13}	—	March 26, 2008	Mount Lemmon	Mount Lemmon Survey	ADE	1.3 km	MPC · JPL
814169	2008 FW_{13}	—	February 10, 2008	Mount Lemmon	Mount Lemmon Survey	·	590 m	MPC · JPL
814170	2008 FE_{21}	—	March 27, 2008	Kitt Peak	Spacewatch	·	860 m	MPC · JPL
814171	2008 FB_{67}	—	March 28, 2008	Kitt Peak	Spacewatch	·	490 m	MPC · JPL
814172	2008 FM_{72}	—	March 30, 2008	Kitt Peak	Spacewatch	·	2.4 km	MPC · JPL
814173	2008 FV_{73}	—	March 30, 2008	Catalina	CSS	·	700 m	MPC · JPL
814174	2008 FS_{84}	—	March 28, 2008	Mount Lemmon	Mount Lemmon Survey	·	540 m	MPC · JPL
814175	2008 FA_{88}	—	March 28, 2008	Mount Lemmon	Mount Lemmon Survey	EOS	1.3 km	MPC · JPL
814176	2008 FO_{90}	—	March 11, 2005	Mount Lemmon	Mount Lemmon Survey	·	460 m	MPC · JPL
814177	2008 FM_{92}	—	June 3, 2005	Kitt Peak	Spacewatch	·	500 m	MPC · JPL
814178	2008 FS_{92}	—	March 29, 2008	Mount Lemmon	Mount Lemmon Survey	·	2.0 km	MPC · JPL
814179	2008 FT_{93}	—	March 29, 2008	Kitt Peak	Spacewatch	LIX	2.3 km	MPC · JPL
814180	2008 FZ_{97}	—	March 30, 2008	Kitt Peak	Spacewatch	·	1.4 km	MPC · JPL
814181	2008 FN_{98}	—	March 30, 2008	Kitt Peak	Spacewatch	·	600 m	MPC · JPL
814182	2008 FO_{98}	—	March 30, 2008	Kitt Peak	Spacewatch	·	1.9 km	MPC · JPL
814183	2008 FL_{101}	—	March 30, 2008	Kitt Peak	Spacewatch	·	570 m	MPC · JPL
814184	2008 FF_{102}	—	March 30, 2008	Kitt Peak	Spacewatch	V	480 m	MPC · JPL
814185	2008 FV_{104}	—	March 30, 2008	Kitt Peak	Spacewatch	·	980 m	MPC · JPL
814186	2008 FO_{113}	—	March 28, 2008	Mount Lemmon	Mount Lemmon Survey	·	550 m	MPC · JPL
814187	2008 FR_{114}	—	March 31, 2008	Mount Lemmon	Mount Lemmon Survey	·	410 m	MPC · JPL
814188	2008 FB_{118}	—	March 9, 1997	Kitt Peak	Spacewatch	·	700 m	MPC · JPL
814189	2008 FW_{119}	—	March 31, 2008	Mount Lemmon	Mount Lemmon Survey	·	530 m	MPC · JPL
814190	2008 FP_{120}	—	March 31, 2008	Mount Lemmon	Mount Lemmon Survey	·	1.8 km	MPC · JPL
814191	2008 FR_{120}	—	March 11, 2008	Mount Lemmon	Mount Lemmon Survey	·	540 m	MPC · JPL
814192	2008 FY_{128}	—	March 29, 2008	Kitt Peak	Spacewatch	·	550 m	MPC · JPL
814193	2008 FO_{138}	—	March 26, 2008	Mount Lemmon	Mount Lemmon Survey	·	520 m	MPC · JPL
814194	2008 FX_{138}	—	March 28, 2008	Kitt Peak	Spacewatch	·	470 m	MPC · JPL
814195	2008 FY_{139}	—	March 31, 2008	Mount Lemmon	Mount Lemmon Survey	·	940 m	MPC · JPL
814196	2008 FO_{140}	—	March 30, 2008	Kitt Peak	Spacewatch	·	600 m	MPC · JPL
814197	2008 FF_{141}	—	January 10, 2011	Kitt Peak	Spacewatch	BAP	700 m	MPC · JPL
814198	2008 FH_{141}	—	March 31, 2008	Mount Lemmon	Mount Lemmon Survey	·	1.6 km	MPC · JPL
814199	2008 FH_{144}	—	March 31, 2008	Mount Lemmon	Mount Lemmon Survey	·	480 m	MPC · JPL
814200	2008 FK_{144}	—	March 29, 2008	Mount Lemmon	Mount Lemmon Survey	EOS	1.5 km	MPC · JPL

== 814201–814300 ==
back to top

Designation			Discovery			Properties		Ref
Permanent	Provisional	Named after	Date	Site	Discoverer(s)	Category	Diam.	Ref
814201	2008 FA_{147}	—	March 29, 2008	Kitt Peak	Spacewatch	·	680 m	MPC · JPL
814202	2008 FQ_{147}	—	March 26, 2008	Mount Lemmon	Mount Lemmon Survey	·	570 m	MPC · JPL
814203	2008 GK_{11}	—	April 1, 2008	Kitt Peak	Spacewatch	·	1.6 km	MPC · JPL
814204	2008 GS_{27}	—	March 26, 2008	Mount Lemmon	Mount Lemmon Survey	·	560 m	MPC · JPL
814205	2008 GN_{29}	—	March 13, 2008	Kitt Peak	Spacewatch	·	1.9 km	MPC · JPL
814206	2008 GP_{31}	—	April 3, 2008	Kitt Peak	Spacewatch	(2076)	480 m	MPC · JPL
814207	2008 GX_{34}	—	March 15, 2004	Kitt Peak	Spacewatch	MAS	560 m	MPC · JPL
814208	2008 GO_{52}	—	March 28, 2008	Mount Lemmon	Mount Lemmon Survey	·	780 m	MPC · JPL
814209	2008 GW_{53}	—	March 10, 2008	Kitt Peak	Spacewatch	·	400 m	MPC · JPL
814210	2008 GP_{55}	—	April 5, 2008	Mount Lemmon	Mount Lemmon Survey	·	450 m	MPC · JPL
814211	2008 GM_{56}	—	July 14, 2016	Haleakala	Pan-STARRS 1	MAS	520 m	MPC · JPL
814212	2008 GP_{57}	—	April 5, 2008	Mount Lemmon	Mount Lemmon Survey	NYS	660 m	MPC · JPL
814213	2008 GF_{76}	—	April 7, 2008	Mount Lemmon	Mount Lemmon Survey	EOS	1.5 km	MPC · JPL
814214	2008 GV_{79}	—	April 7, 2008	Kitt Peak	Spacewatch	·	1.1 km	MPC · JPL
814215	2008 GB_{83}	—	April 8, 2008	Kitt Peak	Spacewatch	·	530 m	MPC · JPL
814216	2008 GW_{95}	—	March 28, 2008	Kitt Peak	Spacewatch	LIX	2.4 km	MPC · JPL
814217	2008 GQ_{106}	—	March 30, 2008	Kitt Peak	Spacewatch	·	520 m	MPC · JPL
814218	2008 GF_{108}	—	April 13, 2008	Mount Lemmon	Mount Lemmon Survey	·	710 m	MPC · JPL
814219	2008 GT_{108}	—	April 13, 2008	Mount Lemmon	Mount Lemmon Survey	·	1.0 km	MPC · JPL
814220	2008 GY_{114}	—	April 3, 2008	Kitt Peak	Spacewatch	·	490 m	MPC · JPL
814221	2008 GP_{118}	—	March 30, 2008	Kitt Peak	Spacewatch	·	520 m	MPC · JPL
814222	2008 GU_{126}	—	April 14, 2008	Mount Lemmon	Mount Lemmon Survey	·	870 m	MPC · JPL
814223	2008 GY_{129}	—	April 4, 2008	Mount Lemmon	Mount Lemmon Survey	·	2.4 km	MPC · JPL
814224	2008 GR_{133}	—	April 4, 2008	Kitt Peak	Spacewatch	·	570 m	MPC · JPL
814225	2008 GE_{137}	—	April 3, 2008	Kitt Peak	Spacewatch	·	490 m	MPC · JPL
814226	2008 GC_{140}	—	April 6, 2008	Kitt Peak	Spacewatch	·	1.1 km	MPC · JPL
814227	2008 GP_{147}	—	April 10, 2008	Kitt Peak	Spacewatch	·	560 m	MPC · JPL
814228	2008 GS_{147}	—	April 7, 2008	Mount Lemmon	Mount Lemmon Survey	·	590 m	MPC · JPL
814229	2008 GE_{151}	—	April 10, 2008	Catalina	CSS	·	1.4 km	MPC · JPL
814230	2008 GV_{152}	—	April 14, 2008	Mount Lemmon	Mount Lemmon Survey	·	1.3 km	MPC · JPL
814231	2008 GE_{153}	—	April 7, 2008	Kitt Peak	Spacewatch	·	370 m	MPC · JPL
814232	2008 GP_{153}	—	September 1, 2013	Mount Lemmon	Mount Lemmon Survey	·	580 m	MPC · JPL
814233	2008 GZ_{153}	—	April 13, 2008	Kitt Peak	Spacewatch	·	520 m	MPC · JPL
814234	2008 GC_{154}	—	March 29, 2012	Haleakala	Pan-STARRS 1	·	1.0 km	MPC · JPL
814235	2008 GW_{154}	—	April 14, 2008	Mount Lemmon	Mount Lemmon Survey	·	1.9 km	MPC · JPL
814236	2008 GH_{155}	—	November 5, 2013	La Silla	La Silla	·	530 m	MPC · JPL
814237	2008 GX_{155}	—	April 2, 2008	Kitt Peak	Spacewatch	·	570 m	MPC · JPL
814238	2008 GY_{155}	—	September 14, 2013	Haleakala	Pan-STARRS 1	·	1.1 km	MPC · JPL
814239	2008 GZ_{155}	—	April 6, 2008	Kitt Peak	Spacewatch	H	290 m	MPC · JPL
814240	2008 GP_{158}	—	May 15, 2012	Mount Lemmon	Mount Lemmon Survey	NYS	720 m	MPC · JPL
814241	2008 GA_{160}	—	August 8, 2012	Haleakala	Pan-STARRS 1	·	510 m	MPC · JPL
814242	2008 GP_{160}	—	March 18, 2018	Haleakala	Pan-STARRS 1	·	560 m	MPC · JPL
814243	2008 GB_{162}	—	April 4, 2008	Kitt Peak	Spacewatch	THB	2.1 km	MPC · JPL
814244	2008 GK_{164}	—	April 5, 2008	Kitt Peak	Spacewatch	MAS	650 m	MPC · JPL
814245	2008 GR_{164}	—	May 12, 2015	Mount Lemmon	Mount Lemmon Survey	·	440 m	MPC · JPL
814246	2008 GM_{165}	—	April 11, 2008	Kitt Peak	Spacewatch	·	650 m	MPC · JPL
814247	2008 GE_{166}	—	April 3, 2008	Kitt Peak	Spacewatch	·	530 m	MPC · JPL
814248	2008 GP_{166}	—	April 4, 2008	Kitt Peak	Spacewatch	·	930 m	MPC · JPL
814249	2008 GY_{166}	—	April 14, 2008	Mount Lemmon	Mount Lemmon Survey	·	510 m	MPC · JPL
814250	2008 GJ_{168}	—	April 5, 2008	Kitt Peak	Spacewatch	·	710 m	MPC · JPL
814251	2008 GP_{169}	—	April 6, 2008	Mount Lemmon	Mount Lemmon Survey	·	930 m	MPC · JPL
814252	2008 GQ_{169}	—	April 6, 2008	Mount Lemmon	Mount Lemmon Survey	V	550 m	MPC · JPL
814253	2008 GC_{170}	—	April 14, 2008	Mount Lemmon	Mount Lemmon Survey	·	1.8 km	MPC · JPL
814254	2008 GL_{171}	—	April 5, 2008	Mount Lemmon	Mount Lemmon Survey	·	510 m	MPC · JPL
814255	2008 GO_{174}	—	April 3, 2008	Kitt Peak	Spacewatch	·	2.1 km	MPC · JPL
814256	2008 GP_{174}	—	April 14, 2008	Mount Lemmon	Mount Lemmon Survey	·	2.3 km	MPC · JPL
814257	2008 GU_{174}	—	April 4, 2008	Mount Lemmon	Mount Lemmon Survey	·	910 m	MPC · JPL
814258	2008 GD_{176}	—	April 7, 2008	Kitt Peak	Spacewatch	·	490 m	MPC · JPL
814259	2008 GG_{176}	—	April 4, 2008	Mount Lemmon	Mount Lemmon Survey	V	400 m	MPC · JPL
814260	2008 GC_{177}	—	April 8, 2008	Mount Lemmon	Mount Lemmon Survey	EOS	1.3 km	MPC · JPL
814261	2008 GK_{177}	—	June 8, 2016	Haleakala	Pan-STARRS 1	·	950 m	MPC · JPL
814262	2008 GA_{179}	—	April 1, 2008	Kitt Peak	Spacewatch	·	460 m	MPC · JPL
814263	2008 GE_{179}	—	April 15, 2008	Mount Lemmon	Mount Lemmon Survey	·	1.0 km	MPC · JPL
814264	2008 GN_{179}	—	April 4, 2008	Mount Lemmon	Mount Lemmon Survey	·	2.0 km	MPC · JPL
814265	2008 GH_{180}	—	March 15, 2008	Mount Lemmon	Mount Lemmon Survey	·	2.0 km	MPC · JPL
814266	2008 GW_{180}	—	April 11, 2008	Kitt Peak	Spacewatch	·	2.0 km	MPC · JPL
814267	2008 HS_{7}	—	April 24, 2008	Kitt Peak	Spacewatch	·	790 m	MPC · JPL
814268	2008 HK_{10}	—	April 24, 2008	Mount Lemmon	Mount Lemmon Survey	·	520 m	MPC · JPL
814269	2008 HO_{10}	—	April 9, 2008	Kitt Peak	Spacewatch	·	660 m	MPC · JPL
814270	2008 HV_{13}	—	March 5, 2008	Kitt Peak	Spacewatch	·	660 m	MPC · JPL
814271	2008 HA_{15}	—	April 11, 2008	Kitt Peak	Spacewatch	·	1.1 km	MPC · JPL
814272	2008 HH_{23}	—	April 27, 2008	Kitt Peak	Spacewatch	·	890 m	MPC · JPL
814273	2008 HD_{26}	—	April 27, 2008	Kitt Peak	Spacewatch	·	730 m	MPC · JPL
814274	2008 HA_{32}	—	April 29, 2008	Mount Lemmon	Mount Lemmon Survey	·	1.0 km	MPC · JPL
814275	2008 HB_{35}	—	April 28, 2008	Kitt Peak	Spacewatch	·	560 m	MPC · JPL
814276	2008 HE_{43}	—	April 27, 2008	Mount Lemmon	Mount Lemmon Survey	·	1.8 km	MPC · JPL
814277	2008 HA_{50}	—	March 21, 2002	Kitt Peak	Spacewatch	·	1.8 km	MPC · JPL
814278	2008 HJ_{50}	—	February 13, 2004	Kitt Peak	Spacewatch	NYS	680 m	MPC · JPL
814279	2008 HL_{52}	—	April 29, 2008	Kitt Peak	Spacewatch	·	1.9 km	MPC · JPL
814280	2008 HS_{61}	—	April 30, 2008	Mount Lemmon	Mount Lemmon Survey	·	670 m	MPC · JPL
814281	2008 HW_{64}	—	April 30, 2008	Mount Lemmon	Mount Lemmon Survey	BAR	640 m	MPC · JPL
814282	2008 HR_{72}	—	October 26, 2013	Kitt Peak	Spacewatch	·	560 m	MPC · JPL
814283	2008 HV_{72}	—	May 10, 2015	Mount Lemmon	Mount Lemmon Survey	·	530 m	MPC · JPL
814284	2008 HE_{73}	—	February 10, 2011	Mount Lemmon	Mount Lemmon Survey	·	610 m	MPC · JPL
814285	2008 HG_{73}	—	April 29, 2008	Mount Lemmon	Mount Lemmon Survey	·	480 m	MPC · JPL
814286	2008 HF_{74}	—	October 14, 2009	La Sagra	OAM	·	670 m	MPC · JPL
814287	2008 HX_{74}	—	April 29, 2008	Mount Lemmon	Mount Lemmon Survey	·	1.4 km	MPC · JPL
814288	2008 HO_{75}	—	May 25, 2015	Haleakala	Pan-STARRS 1	·	490 m	MPC · JPL
814289	2008 HY_{75}	—	April 19, 2015	Mount Lemmon	Mount Lemmon Survey	(2076)	510 m	MPC · JPL
814290	2008 HL_{76}	—	April 25, 2015	Haleakala	Pan-STARRS 1	·	440 m	MPC · JPL
814291	2008 HW_{77}	—	April 30, 2008	Mount Lemmon	Mount Lemmon Survey	·	1.0 km	MPC · JPL
814292	2008 HR_{78}	—	April 30, 2008	Mount Lemmon	Mount Lemmon Survey	THM	1.8 km	MPC · JPL
814293	2008 HL_{79}	—	April 5, 2008	Anderson Mesa	Wasserman, L. H.	·	470 m	MPC · JPL
814294	2008 HA_{80}	—	April 30, 2008	Mount Lemmon	Mount Lemmon Survey	·	2.0 km	MPC · JPL
814295	2008 JM_{2}	—	May 2, 2008	Kitt Peak	Spacewatch	·	910 m	MPC · JPL
814296	2008 JK_{8}	—	April 11, 2008	Mount Lemmon	Mount Lemmon Survey	EUN	830 m	MPC · JPL
814297	2008 JR_{13}	—	May 5, 2008	Mount Lemmon	Mount Lemmon Survey	·	810 m	MPC · JPL
814298	2008 JS_{15}	—	May 3, 2008	Kitt Peak	Spacewatch	·	600 m	MPC · JPL
814299	2008 JE_{16}	—	May 3, 2008	Mount Lemmon	Mount Lemmon Survey	EOS	1.2 km	MPC · JPL
814300	2008 JJ_{16}	—	May 3, 2008	Mount Lemmon	Mount Lemmon Survey	·	1.9 km	MPC · JPL

== 814301–814400 ==
back to top

Designation			Discovery			Properties		Ref
Permanent	Provisional	Named after	Date	Site	Discoverer(s)	Category	Diam.	Ref
814301	2008 JO_{16}	—	May 3, 2008	Mount Lemmon	Mount Lemmon Survey	EUP	1.8 km	MPC · JPL
814302	2008 JZ_{16}	—	May 3, 2008	Mount Lemmon	Mount Lemmon Survey	·	1.9 km	MPC · JPL
814303	2008 JL_{23}	—	May 7, 2008	Kitt Peak	Spacewatch	·	510 m	MPC · JPL
814304	2008 JE_{33}	—	April 15, 2008	Mount Lemmon	Mount Lemmon Survey	H	450 m	MPC · JPL
814305	2008 JE_{34}	—	April 16, 2008	Mount Lemmon	Mount Lemmon Survey	·	1.1 km	MPC · JPL
814306	2008 JC_{44}	—	December 13, 2010	Mount Lemmon	Mount Lemmon Survey	·	1.3 km	MPC · JPL
814307	2008 JP_{44}	—	May 15, 2008	Mount Lemmon	Mount Lemmon Survey	EUN	940 m	MPC · JPL
814308	2008 JU_{44}	—	May 14, 2008	Mount Lemmon	Mount Lemmon Survey	·	550 m	MPC · JPL
814309	2008 JY_{44}	—	November 25, 2014	Haleakala	Pan-STARRS 1	H	400 m	MPC · JPL
814310	2008 JG_{45}	—	May 21, 2015	Haleakala	Pan-STARRS 1	·	570 m	MPC · JPL
814311	2008 JQ_{45}	—	May 3, 2008	Mount Lemmon	Mount Lemmon Survey	·	1.1 km	MPC · JPL
814312	2008 JJ_{47}	—	October 24, 2009	Kitt Peak	Spacewatch	·	610 m	MPC · JPL
814313	2008 JF_{48}	—	May 5, 2008	Kitt Peak	Spacewatch	TIR	2.1 km	MPC · JPL
814314	2008 JG_{49}	—	November 26, 2016	Mount Lemmon	Mount Lemmon Survey	·	600 m	MPC · JPL
814315	2008 JJ_{49}	—	April 13, 2012	Haleakala	Pan-STARRS 1	·	840 m	MPC · JPL
814316	2008 JV_{49}	—	March 31, 2008	Mount Lemmon	Mount Lemmon Survey	·	1.6 km	MPC · JPL
814317	2008 JY_{49}	—	May 14, 2008	Mount Lemmon	Mount Lemmon Survey	·	870 m	MPC · JPL
814318	2008 JO_{53}	—	May 3, 2008	Mount Lemmon	Mount Lemmon Survey	·	490 m	MPC · JPL
814319	2008 JZ_{53}	—	May 3, 2008	Mount Lemmon	Mount Lemmon Survey	·	680 m	MPC · JPL
814320	2008 JB_{54}	—	May 8, 2008	Kitt Peak	Spacewatch	·	2.0 km	MPC · JPL
814321	2008 JT_{54}	—	May 5, 2008	Mount Lemmon	Mount Lemmon Survey	·	470 m	MPC · JPL
814322	2008 JZ_{54}	—	May 8, 2008	Kitt Peak	Spacewatch	·	460 m	MPC · JPL
814323	2008 JE_{55}	—	May 14, 2008	Mount Lemmon	Mount Lemmon Survey	·	940 m	MPC · JPL
814324	2008 JR_{55}	—	May 7, 2008	Mount Lemmon	Mount Lemmon Survey	·	2.4 km	MPC · JPL
814325	2008 JS_{55}	—	May 3, 2008	Mount Lemmon	Mount Lemmon Survey	·	1.9 km	MPC · JPL
814326	2008 KK_{1}	—	May 26, 2008	Kitt Peak	Spacewatch	·	810 m	MPC · JPL
814327	2008 KS_{9}	—	May 3, 2008	Kitt Peak	Spacewatch	·	1.9 km	MPC · JPL
814328	2008 KU_{15}	—	April 27, 2008	Kitt Peak	Spacewatch	ADE	1.5 km	MPC · JPL
814329	2008 KF_{19}	—	May 28, 2008	Mount Lemmon	Mount Lemmon Survey	·	600 m	MPC · JPL
814330	2008 KH_{20}	—	May 2, 2008	Kitt Peak	Spacewatch	·	570 m	MPC · JPL
814331	2008 KU_{27}	—	April 27, 2008	Kitt Peak	Spacewatch	BAR	920 m	MPC · JPL
814332	2008 KH_{32}	—	April 25, 2008	Kitt Peak	Spacewatch	·	2.7 km	MPC · JPL
814333	2008 KK_{33}	—	May 7, 2008	Kitt Peak	Spacewatch	·	2.1 km	MPC · JPL
814334	2008 KM_{35}	—	May 13, 2008	Kitt Peak	Spacewatch	·	950 m	MPC · JPL
814335	2008 KG_{44}	—	December 1, 2010	Mount Lemmon	Mount Lemmon Survey	T_{j} (2.98) · 3:2	4.1 km	MPC · JPL
814336	2008 KU_{44}	—	January 1, 2014	Haleakala	Pan-STARRS 1	V	510 m	MPC · JPL
814337	2008 KF_{45}	—	March 6, 2013	Haleakala	Pan-STARRS 1	LIX	2.4 km	MPC · JPL
814338	2008 KH_{45}	—	April 23, 2015	Haleakala	Pan-STARRS 1	·	630 m	MPC · JPL
814339	2008 KB_{47}	—	October 23, 2009	Mount Lemmon	Mount Lemmon Survey	·	620 m	MPC · JPL
814340	2008 KF_{47}	—	April 16, 2013	Cerro Tololo-DECam	DECam	·	1.5 km	MPC · JPL
814341	2008 KR_{48}	—	May 28, 2008	Mount Lemmon	Mount Lemmon Survey	·	1.6 km	MPC · JPL
814342	2008 KS_{48}	—	May 28, 2008	Kitt Peak	Spacewatch	·	2.1 km	MPC · JPL
814343	2008 KK_{49}	—	May 31, 2008	Kitt Peak	Spacewatch	ELF	2.7 km	MPC · JPL
814344	2008 LH	—	June 1, 2008	Kitt Peak	Spacewatch	MAR	860 m	MPC · JPL
814345	2008 LQ_{1}	—	June 2, 2008	Kitt Peak	Spacewatch	·	560 m	MPC · JPL
814346	2008 LD_{3}	—	June 1, 2008	Mount Lemmon	Mount Lemmon Survey	·	680 m	MPC · JPL
814347	2008 LP_{3}	—	June 2, 2008	Kitt Peak	Spacewatch	·	2.2 km	MPC · JPL
814348	2008 LT_{4}	—	June 3, 2008	Mount Lemmon	Mount Lemmon Survey	·	620 m	MPC · JPL
814349	2008 LC_{5}	—	June 3, 2008	Mount Lemmon	Mount Lemmon Survey	·	580 m	MPC · JPL
814350	2008 LE_{10}	—	May 28, 2008	Mount Lemmon	Mount Lemmon Survey	·	610 m	MPC · JPL
814351	2008 LQ_{13}	—	May 26, 2008	Kitt Peak	Spacewatch	EUN	820 m	MPC · JPL
814352	2008 LJ_{19}	—	October 7, 2012	Haleakala	Pan-STARRS 1	NYS	950 m	MPC · JPL
814353	2008 LN_{19}	—	May 19, 2015	Haleakala	Pan-STARRS 1	·	730 m	MPC · JPL
814354	2008 LA_{21}	—	June 9, 2008	Kitt Peak	Spacewatch	·	1.2 km	MPC · JPL
814355	2008 LJ_{21}	—	June 10, 2008	Kitt Peak	Spacewatch	·	1.1 km	MPC · JPL
814356	2008 MX_{2}	—	June 2, 2008	Mount Lemmon	Mount Lemmon Survey	·	750 m	MPC · JPL
814357	2008 MS_{4}	—	June 30, 2008	Kitt Peak	Spacewatch	·	660 m	MPC · JPL
814358	2008 MX_{5}	—	June 30, 2008	Kitt Peak	Spacewatch	·	1.3 km	MPC · JPL
814359	2008 NV_{2}	—	June 6, 2008	Kitt Peak	Spacewatch	·	830 m	MPC · JPL
814360	2008 OD_{8}	—	July 30, 2008	Mount Lemmon	Mount Lemmon Survey	·	990 m	MPC · JPL
814361	2008 OJ_{10}	—	July 3, 2008	Mount Lemmon	Mount Lemmon Survey	·	470 m	MPC · JPL
814362	2008 OC_{26}	—	July 30, 2008	Mount Lemmon	Mount Lemmon Survey	NYS	1.0 km	MPC · JPL
814363	2008 OS_{26}	—	December 4, 2013	Haleakala	Pan-STARRS 1	JUN	810 m	MPC · JPL
814364	2008 OW_{26}	—	July 30, 2008	Mount Lemmon	Mount Lemmon Survey	·	1.2 km	MPC · JPL
814365	2008 OB_{27}	—	July 30, 2008	Mount Lemmon	Mount Lemmon Survey	·	1.0 km	MPC · JPL
814366	2008 OC_{27}	—	December 12, 2013	Mount Lemmon	Mount Lemmon Survey	EUN	1.0 km	MPC · JPL
814367	2008 OW_{28}	—	January 2, 2016	Mount Lemmon	Mount Lemmon Survey	·	2.7 km	MPC · JPL
814368	2008 OA_{29}	—	February 23, 2015	Haleakala	Pan-STARRS 1	ERI	1.1 km	MPC · JPL
814369	2008 OF_{30}	—	October 9, 2012	Haleakala	Pan-STARRS 1	·	930 m	MPC · JPL
814370	2008 OT_{30}	—	October 31, 2014	Mount Lemmon	Mount Lemmon Survey	·	1.5 km	MPC · JPL
814371	2008 OR_{31}	—	July 25, 2008	Mount Lemmon	Mount Lemmon Survey	·	3.4 km	MPC · JPL
814372	2008 PA	—	June 8, 2008	Kitt Peak	Spacewatch	·	490 m	MPC · JPL
814373	2008 PQ	—	July 30, 2008	Kitt Peak	Spacewatch	·	570 m	MPC · JPL
814374	2008 PN_{18}	—	August 2, 2008	Charleston	R. Holmes, H. Devore	·	470 m	MPC · JPL
814375	2008 PU_{22}	—	August 6, 2008	La Sagra	OAM	·	450 m	MPC · JPL
814376	2008 PV_{22}	—	August 11, 2008	La Sagra	OAM	·	2.2 km	MPC · JPL
814377	2008 PC_{23}	—	April 21, 2012	Kitt Peak	Spacewatch	·	1.2 km	MPC · JPL
814378	2008 PS_{24}	—	August 11, 2008	Črni Vrh	Skvarč, J.	(1547)	1.3 km	MPC · JPL
814379	2008 QW	—	August 22, 2008	Piszkéstető	K. Sárneczky	·	2.3 km	MPC · JPL
814380	2008 QJ_{9}	—	August 21, 2008	Kitt Peak	Spacewatch	·	1.5 km	MPC · JPL
814381	2008 QC_{36}	—	August 21, 2008	Kitt Peak	Spacewatch	·	580 m	MPC · JPL
814382	2008 QR_{37}	—	August 21, 2008	Kitt Peak	Spacewatch	MIS	1.9 km	MPC · JPL
814383	2008 QB_{42}	—	October 31, 1999	Kitt Peak	Spacewatch	·	1.2 km	MPC · JPL
814384	2008 QA_{48}	—	August 24, 2008	Socorro	LINEAR	·	1.4 km	MPC · JPL
814385	2008 QH_{49}	—	July 30, 2008	Kitt Peak	Spacewatch	·	600 m	MPC · JPL
814386	2008 QX_{49}	—	August 29, 2008	La Sagra	OAM	·	3.0 km	MPC · JPL
814387	2008 QK_{50}	—	August 23, 2008	Kitt Peak	Spacewatch	H	480 m	MPC · JPL
814388	2008 QT_{51}	—	August 21, 2008	Kitt Peak	Spacewatch	·	1.7 km	MPC · JPL
814389	2008 RQ_{2}	—	September 2, 2008	Kitt Peak	Spacewatch	NYS	840 m	MPC · JPL
814390	2008 RN_{7}	—	August 9, 2008	La Sagra	OAM	TIR	2.2 km	MPC · JPL
814391	2008 RY_{12}	—	September 4, 2008	Kitt Peak	Spacewatch	·	430 m	MPC · JPL
814392	2008 RO_{16}	—	August 24, 2008	Kitt Peak	Spacewatch	·	510 m	MPC · JPL
814393	2008 RZ_{25}	—	September 1, 2008	Zelenchukskaya	Station, Zelenchukskaya	·	2.3 km	MPC · JPL
814394	2008 RT_{28}	—	September 2, 2008	Kitt Peak	Spacewatch	·	1.3 km	MPC · JPL
814395	2008 RT_{31}	—	September 2, 2008	Kitt Peak	Spacewatch	·	710 m	MPC · JPL
814396	2008 RY_{36}	—	February 21, 2007	Mount Lemmon	Mount Lemmon Survey	·	560 m	MPC · JPL
814397	2008 RS_{39}	—	September 2, 2008	Kitt Peak	Spacewatch	MAR	650 m	MPC · JPL
814398	2008 RT_{41}	—	September 2, 2008	Kitt Peak	Spacewatch	·	740 m	MPC · JPL
814399	2008 RE_{46}	—	September 2, 2008	Kitt Peak	Spacewatch	·	780 m	MPC · JPL
814400	2008 RF_{47}	—	September 2, 2008	Kitt Peak	Spacewatch	·	1.0 km	MPC · JPL

== 814401–814500 ==
back to top

Designation			Discovery			Properties		Ref
Permanent	Provisional	Named after	Date	Site	Discoverer(s)	Category	Diam.	Ref
814401	2008 RH_{52}	—	September 3, 2008	Kitt Peak	Spacewatch	V	510 m	MPC · JPL
814402	2008 RG_{62}	—	September 4, 2008	Kitt Peak	Spacewatch	·	580 m	MPC · JPL
814403	2008 RZ_{63}	—	September 4, 2008	Kitt Peak	Spacewatch	·	610 m	MPC · JPL
814404	2008 RG_{70}	—	September 5, 2008	Kitt Peak	Spacewatch	·	2.3 km	MPC · JPL
814405	2008 RZ_{79}	—	September 5, 2008	Kitt Peak	Spacewatch	·	440 m	MPC · JPL
814406	2008 RE_{86}	—	September 5, 2008	Kitt Peak	Spacewatch	·	2.2 km	MPC · JPL
814407	2008 RE_{98}	—	September 6, 2008	Catalina	CSS	(1547)	1.0 km	MPC · JPL
814408	2008 RC_{101}	—	September 6, 2008	Kitt Peak	Spacewatch	THM	1.7 km	MPC · JPL
814409	2008 RZ_{111}	—	September 4, 2008	Kitt Peak	Spacewatch	·	540 m	MPC · JPL
814410	2008 RX_{123}	—	September 6, 2008	Mount Lemmon	Mount Lemmon Survey	MAS	550 m	MPC · JPL
814411	2008 RZ_{135}	—	September 4, 2008	Kitt Peak	Spacewatch	H	350 m	MPC · JPL
814412	2008 RJ_{136}	—	September 4, 2008	Kitt Peak	Spacewatch	MAS	630 m	MPC · JPL
814413	2008 RV_{136}	—	September 4, 2008	Kitt Peak	Spacewatch	·	2.2 km	MPC · JPL
814414	2008 RX_{137}	—	September 5, 2008	Kitt Peak	Spacewatch	T_{j} (2.98)	3.0 km	MPC · JPL
814415	2008 RJ_{145}	—	September 2, 2008	Kitt Peak	Spacewatch	MAS	650 m	MPC · JPL
814416	2008 RZ_{149}	—	September 7, 2008	Mount Lemmon	Mount Lemmon Survey	·	1.4 km	MPC · JPL
814417	2008 RR_{150}	—	August 24, 2017	Haleakala	Pan-STARRS 1	MRX	790 m	MPC · JPL
814418	2008 RK_{152}	—	September 6, 2008	Mount Lemmon	Mount Lemmon Survey	·	530 m	MPC · JPL
814419	2008 RP_{152}	—	September 3, 2008	Kitt Peak	Spacewatch	·	1.2 km	MPC · JPL
814420	2008 RD_{153}	—	September 3, 2008	Kitt Peak	Spacewatch	·	500 m	MPC · JPL
814421	2008 RP_{153}	—	September 6, 2008	Mount Lemmon	Mount Lemmon Survey	·	830 m	MPC · JPL
814422	2008 RN_{155}	—	September 6, 2008	Mount Lemmon	Mount Lemmon Survey	·	860 m	MPC · JPL
814423	2008 RY_{155}	—	September 6, 2008	Mount Lemmon	Mount Lemmon Survey	THM	1.8 km	MPC · JPL
814424	2008 RO_{157}	—	August 11, 2015	Haleakala	Pan-STARRS 1	·	670 m	MPC · JPL
814425	2008 RM_{159}	—	September 5, 2008	Kitt Peak	Spacewatch	·	1.4 km	MPC · JPL
814426	2008 RU_{161}	—	September 4, 2008	Kitt Peak	Spacewatch	·	1.1 km	MPC · JPL
814427	2008 RB_{162}	—	September 6, 2008	Kitt Peak	Spacewatch	·	780 m	MPC · JPL
814428	2008 RH_{164}	—	September 6, 2008	Mount Lemmon	Mount Lemmon Survey	·	700 m	MPC · JPL
814429	2008 RK_{164}	—	September 7, 2008	Mount Lemmon	Mount Lemmon Survey	·	550 m	MPC · JPL
814430	2008 RT_{165}	—	December 4, 2012	Mount Lemmon	Mount Lemmon Survey	·	1.0 km	MPC · JPL
814431	2008 RR_{166}	—	July 28, 2015	Haleakala	Pan-STARRS 1	V	480 m	MPC · JPL
814432	2008 RW_{166}	—	August 9, 2015	Haleakala	Pan-STARRS 1	·	600 m	MPC · JPL
814433	2008 RB_{170}	—	September 9, 2008	Mount Lemmon	Mount Lemmon Survey	·	1.6 km	MPC · JPL
814434	2008 RF_{170}	—	September 4, 2008	Kitt Peak	Spacewatch	VER	2.1 km	MPC · JPL
814435	2008 RH_{170}	—	September 6, 2008	Kitt Peak	Spacewatch	·	1.2 km	MPC · JPL
814436	2008 RT_{170}	—	September 5, 2008	Kitt Peak	Spacewatch	·	1.2 km	MPC · JPL
814437	2008 RJ_{172}	—	September 9, 2008	Mount Lemmon	Mount Lemmon Survey	·	1.6 km	MPC · JPL
814438	2008 RT_{172}	—	September 5, 2008	Kitt Peak	Spacewatch	V	470 m	MPC · JPL
814439	2008 RW_{173}	—	September 4, 2008	Kitt Peak	Spacewatch	·	990 m	MPC · JPL
814440	2008 RB_{176}	—	September 9, 2008	Mount Lemmon	Mount Lemmon Survey	·	1.2 km	MPC · JPL
814441	2008 RL_{176}	—	September 6, 2008	Mount Lemmon	Mount Lemmon Survey	·	570 m	MPC · JPL
814442	2008 RQ_{176}	—	September 9, 2008	Mount Lemmon	Mount Lemmon Survey	·	1.5 km	MPC · JPL
814443	2008 RV_{176}	—	September 6, 2008	Mount Lemmon	Mount Lemmon Survey	URS	2.2 km	MPC · JPL
814444	2008 RY_{177}	—	September 7, 2008	Mount Lemmon	Mount Lemmon Survey	·	500 m	MPC · JPL
814445	2008 RS_{179}	—	September 9, 2008	Mount Lemmon	Mount Lemmon Survey	·	1.1 km	MPC · JPL
814446	2008 RN_{180}	—	September 7, 2008	Mount Lemmon	Mount Lemmon Survey	·	950 m	MPC · JPL
814447	2008 RD_{184}	—	September 7, 2008	Mount Lemmon	Mount Lemmon Survey	NYS	550 m	MPC · JPL
814448	2008 SF_{2}	—	September 7, 2008	Catalina	CSS	·	1.5 km	MPC · JPL
814449	2008 SO_{11}	—	September 3, 2008	Kitt Peak	Spacewatch	·	1.2 km	MPC · JPL
814450	2008 SP_{16}	—	August 21, 2008	Kitt Peak	Spacewatch	·	1.1 km	MPC · JPL
814451	2008 SB_{24}	—	September 6, 2008	Mount Lemmon	Mount Lemmon Survey	·	1.4 km	MPC · JPL
814452	2008 SH_{24}	—	September 6, 2008	Mount Lemmon	Mount Lemmon Survey	·	550 m	MPC · JPL
814453	2008 SM_{29}	—	September 2, 2008	Kitt Peak	Spacewatch	ADE	2.1 km	MPC · JPL
814454	2008 SD_{50}	—	September 20, 2008	Catalina	CSS	·	1.3 km	MPC · JPL
814455	2008 SH_{60}	—	September 20, 2008	Mount Lemmon	Mount Lemmon Survey	·	1.4 km	MPC · JPL
814456	2008 SK_{62}	—	September 21, 2008	Mount Lemmon	Mount Lemmon Survey	·	3.2 km	MPC · JPL
814457	2008 SA_{63}	—	August 23, 2008	Kitt Peak	Spacewatch	·	1.6 km	MPC · JPL
814458	2008 SY_{64}	—	September 21, 2008	Mount Lemmon	Mount Lemmon Survey	·	1.6 km	MPC · JPL
814459	2008 SJ_{66}	—	September 4, 2008	Kitt Peak	Spacewatch	·	1.1 km	MPC · JPL
814460	2008 SP_{66}	—	September 10, 2008	Kitt Peak	Spacewatch	·	1.3 km	MPC · JPL
814461	2008 SH_{70}	—	September 22, 2008	Kitt Peak	Spacewatch	·	520 m	MPC · JPL
814462	2008 SN_{87}	—	August 26, 2008	La Sagra	OAM	·	1.2 km	MPC · JPL
814463	2008 SR_{93}	—	September 21, 2008	Kitt Peak	Spacewatch	·	760 m	MPC · JPL
814464	2008 SZ_{103}	—	September 7, 2008	Mount Lemmon	Mount Lemmon Survey	·	2.8 km	MPC · JPL
814465	2008 SJ_{123}	—	September 6, 2008	Mount Lemmon	Mount Lemmon Survey	·	680 m	MPC · JPL
814466	2008 SJ_{126}	—	September 22, 2008	Kitt Peak	Spacewatch	·	620 m	MPC · JPL
814467	2008 SV_{126}	—	September 22, 2008	Kitt Peak	Spacewatch	·	1.8 km	MPC · JPL
814468	2008 SY_{141}	—	September 24, 2008	Mount Lemmon	Mount Lemmon Survey	·	600 m	MPC · JPL
814469	2008 SL_{142}	—	September 24, 2008	Mount Lemmon	Mount Lemmon Survey	·	2.2 km	MPC · JPL
814470	2008 SV_{157}	—	September 3, 2008	Kitt Peak	Spacewatch	·	930 m	MPC · JPL
814471	2008 SY_{157}	—	September 2, 2008	Kitt Peak	Spacewatch	·	500 m	MPC · JPL
814472	2008 SF_{164}	—	September 23, 2008	Mount Lemmon	Mount Lemmon Survey	NYS	880 m	MPC · JPL
814473	2008 SL_{164}	—	September 29, 2008	Catalina	CSS	·	520 m	MPC · JPL
814474	2008 SL_{172}	—	September 21, 2008	Catalina	CSS	·	1.6 km	MPC · JPL
814475	2008 SR_{178}	—	September 24, 2008	Kitt Peak	Spacewatch	H	330 m	MPC · JPL
814476	2008 ST_{185}	—	August 29, 2008	Črni Vrh	Matičič, S.	·	1.7 km	MPC · JPL
814477	2008 SZ_{187}	—	September 25, 2008	Kitt Peak	Spacewatch	·	1.0 km	MPC · JPL
814478	2008 SU_{195}	—	September 21, 2008	Kitt Peak	Spacewatch	NYS	690 m	MPC · JPL
814479	2008 SR_{196}	—	September 25, 2008	Kitt Peak	Spacewatch	T_{j} (2.99) · 3:2	3.5 km	MPC · JPL
814480	2008 SS_{216}	—	September 29, 2008	Mount Lemmon	Mount Lemmon Survey	·	560 m	MPC · JPL
814481	2008 SR_{220}	—	August 21, 2008	Kitt Peak	Spacewatch	NYS	860 m	MPC · JPL
814482	2008 SC_{229}	—	September 28, 2008	Mount Lemmon	Mount Lemmon Survey	·	1.2 km	MPC · JPL
814483	2008 SY_{229}	—	September 28, 2008	Mount Lemmon	Mount Lemmon Survey	L4	6.0 km	MPC · JPL
814484	2008 SP_{230}	—	September 28, 2008	Mount Lemmon	Mount Lemmon Survey	·	1.5 km	MPC · JPL
814485	2008 SN_{236}	—	September 21, 2008	Kitt Peak	Spacewatch	·	440 m	MPC · JPL
814486	2008 SN_{247}	—	September 2, 2008	Kitt Peak	Spacewatch	MAS	600 m	MPC · JPL
814487	2008 SM_{264}	—	September 25, 2008	Kitt Peak	Spacewatch	·	1.6 km	MPC · JPL
814488	2008 SV_{266}	—	September 21, 2008	Kitt Peak	Spacewatch	·	1.3 km	MPC · JPL
814489	2008 SQ_{274}	—	September 20, 2008	Kitt Peak	Spacewatch	THM	1.6 km	MPC · JPL
814490	2008 SW_{282}	—	September 27, 2008	Mount Lemmon	Mount Lemmon Survey	·	1.6 km	MPC · JPL
814491	2008 SK_{286}	—	September 22, 2008	Mount Lemmon	Mount Lemmon Survey	·	570 m	MPC · JPL
814492	2008 SF_{287}	—	September 23, 2008	Kitt Peak	Spacewatch	·	940 m	MPC · JPL
814493	2008 SK_{287}	—	September 23, 2008	Kitt Peak	Spacewatch	·	1.1 km	MPC · JPL
814494	2008 SY_{289}	—	September 28, 2008	Mount Lemmon	Mount Lemmon Survey	·	780 m	MPC · JPL
814495	2008 SD_{295}	—	September 23, 2008	Catalina	CSS	·	590 m	MPC · JPL
814496	2008 SA_{299}	—	September 22, 2008	Socorro	LINEAR	H	440 m	MPC · JPL
814497	2008 SA_{309}	—	September 22, 2008	Socorro	LINEAR	·	920 m	MPC · JPL
814498	2008 SC_{309}	—	September 20, 2008	Kitt Peak	Spacewatch	NYS	870 m	MPC · JPL
814499	2008 SK_{310}	—	July 25, 2001	Haleakala	NEAT	·	570 m	MPC · JPL
814500	2008 SH_{313}	—	September 25, 2008	Mount Lemmon	Mount Lemmon Survey	·	1.4 km	MPC · JPL

== 814501–814600 ==
back to top

Designation			Discovery			Properties		Ref
Permanent	Provisional	Named after	Date	Site	Discoverer(s)	Category	Diam.	Ref
814501	2008 SL_{315}	—	September 23, 2008	Mount Lemmon	Mount Lemmon Survey	(1547)	1.1 km	MPC · JPL
814502	2008 SD_{317}	—	September 25, 2008	Kitt Peak	Spacewatch	PAD	1.3 km	MPC · JPL
814503	2008 SQ_{317}	—	April 5, 2016	Haleakala	Pan-STARRS 1	AEO	780 m	MPC · JPL
814504	2008 SL_{318}	—	September 28, 2008	Mount Lemmon	Mount Lemmon Survey	·	1.5 km	MPC · JPL
814505	2008 SE_{319}	—	September 20, 2008	Mount Lemmon	Mount Lemmon Survey	·	2.7 km	MPC · JPL
814506	2008 SW_{319}	—	September 23, 2008	Kitt Peak	Spacewatch	·	1.5 km	MPC · JPL
814507	2008 SH_{320}	—	September 28, 2008	Mount Lemmon	Mount Lemmon Survey	·	490 m	MPC · JPL
814508	2008 SY_{320}	—	September 27, 2008	Mount Lemmon	Mount Lemmon Survey	·	890 m	MPC · JPL
814509	2008 SU_{321}	—	September 6, 2008	Kitt Peak	Spacewatch	·	1.2 km	MPC · JPL
814510	2008 SX_{323}	—	September 6, 2008	Kitt Peak	Spacewatch	THM	1.7 km	MPC · JPL
814511	2008 SK_{324}	—	September 22, 2008	Kitt Peak	Spacewatch	NYS	880 m	MPC · JPL
814512	2008 SS_{324}	—	December 2, 2012	Mount Lemmon	Mount Lemmon Survey	·	890 m	MPC · JPL
814513	2008 SB_{325}	—	March 14, 2011	Mount Lemmon	Mount Lemmon Survey	·	2.3 km	MPC · JPL
814514	2008 ST_{326}	—	September 22, 2008	Kitt Peak	Spacewatch	MAS	560 m	MPC · JPL
814515	2008 SZ_{329}	—	September 23, 2008	Mount Lemmon	Mount Lemmon Survey	·	1.2 km	MPC · JPL
814516	2008 SU_{330}	—	February 9, 2014	Haleakala	Pan-STARRS 1	·	650 m	MPC · JPL
814517	2008 SM_{331}	—	September 22, 2008	Kitt Peak	Spacewatch	·	440 m	MPC · JPL
814518	2008 SF_{332}	—	October 21, 2012	Kitt Peak	Spacewatch	MAS	620 m	MPC · JPL
814519	2008 SH_{332}	—	January 29, 2017	Haleakala	Pan-STARRS 1	·	2.7 km	MPC · JPL
814520	2008 SZ_{333}	—	September 24, 2008	Kitt Peak	Spacewatch	·	620 m	MPC · JPL
814521	2008 SH_{338}	—	September 28, 2008	Mount Lemmon	Mount Lemmon Survey	·	1.6 km	MPC · JPL
814522	2008 SB_{340}	—	September 29, 2008	Mount Lemmon	Mount Lemmon Survey	·	590 m	MPC · JPL
814523	2008 SW_{341}	—	September 25, 2008	Kitt Peak	Spacewatch	·	820 m	MPC · JPL
814524	2008 SC_{344}	—	September 23, 2008	Kitt Peak	Spacewatch	(5)	640 m	MPC · JPL
814525	2008 SL_{344}	—	September 23, 2008	Mount Lemmon	Mount Lemmon Survey	·	570 m	MPC · JPL
814526	2008 SQ_{346}	—	September 23, 2008	Kitt Peak	Spacewatch	·	860 m	MPC · JPL
814527	2008 SR_{348}	—	September 24, 2008	Kitt Peak	Spacewatch	·	1.2 km	MPC · JPL
814528	2008 SX_{349}	—	September 20, 2008	Mount Lemmon	Mount Lemmon Survey	·	560 m	MPC · JPL
814529	2008 SD_{350}	—	September 22, 2008	Kitt Peak	Spacewatch	·	1.3 km	MPC · JPL
814530	2008 SO_{352}	—	September 23, 2008	Kitt Peak	Spacewatch	·	1.6 km	MPC · JPL
814531	2008 SB_{356}	—	September 23, 2008	Mount Lemmon	Mount Lemmon Survey	·	490 m	MPC · JPL
814532	2008 SG_{362}	—	September 21, 2008	Kitt Peak	Spacewatch	·	490 m	MPC · JPL
814533	2008 TE_{7}	—	September 23, 2008	Catalina	CSS	·	1.3 km	MPC · JPL
814534	2008 TJ_{14}	—	October 1, 2008	Mount Lemmon	Mount Lemmon Survey	·	1.1 km	MPC · JPL
814535	2008 TW_{20}	—	September 6, 2008	Mount Lemmon	Mount Lemmon Survey	·	910 m	MPC · JPL
814536	2008 TM_{25}	—	September 20, 2008	Kitt Peak	Spacewatch	·	440 m	MPC · JPL
814537	2008 TM_{28}	—	September 5, 2008	Kitt Peak	Spacewatch	·	510 m	MPC · JPL
814538	2008 TD_{37}	—	September 5, 2008	Kitt Peak	Spacewatch	·	1.4 km	MPC · JPL
814539	2008 TH_{38}	—	September 4, 2008	Kitt Peak	Spacewatch	·	810 m	MPC · JPL
814540	2008 TJ_{41}	—	October 1, 2008	Mount Lemmon	Mount Lemmon Survey	JUN	750 m	MPC · JPL
814541	2008 TR_{42}	—	October 1, 2008	Mount Lemmon	Mount Lemmon Survey	·	1.6 km	MPC · JPL
814542	2008 TM_{54}	—	September 24, 2008	Kitt Peak	Spacewatch	·	2.5 km	MPC · JPL
814543	2008 TX_{54}	—	February 1, 2006	Kitt Peak	Spacewatch	·	480 m	MPC · JPL
814544	2008 TP_{61}	—	September 20, 2008	Kitt Peak	Spacewatch	·	730 m	MPC · JPL
814545	2008 TU_{68}	—	October 2, 2008	Kitt Peak	Spacewatch	·	750 m	MPC · JPL
814546	2008 TH_{71}	—	October 2, 2008	Kitt Peak	Spacewatch	NYS	870 m	MPC · JPL
814547	2008 TR_{73}	—	October 2, 2008	Kitt Peak	Spacewatch	V	440 m	MPC · JPL
814548	2008 TT_{73}	—	September 6, 2008	Mount Lemmon	Mount Lemmon Survey	·	550 m	MPC · JPL
814549	2008 TE_{76}	—	October 2, 2008	Mount Lemmon	Mount Lemmon Survey	·	1.2 km	MPC · JPL
814550	2008 TX_{76}	—	September 2, 2008	Kitt Peak	Spacewatch	·	1.3 km	MPC · JPL
814551	2008 TN_{78}	—	September 23, 2008	Mount Lemmon	Mount Lemmon Survey	·	1.2 km	MPC · JPL
814552	2008 TU_{79}	—	September 23, 2008	Mount Lemmon	Mount Lemmon Survey	KOR	1.2 km	MPC · JPL
814553	2008 TN_{96}	—	October 6, 2008	Kitt Peak	Spacewatch	SUL	1.5 km	MPC · JPL
814554	2008 TM_{97}	—	September 5, 2008	Kitt Peak	Spacewatch	·	1.2 km	MPC · JPL
814555	2008 TR_{97}	—	September 5, 2008	Kitt Peak	Spacewatch	·	650 m	MPC · JPL
814556	2008 TZ_{98}	—	September 24, 2008	Kitt Peak	Spacewatch	·	1.4 km	MPC · JPL
814557	2008 TU_{99}	—	October 6, 2008	Kitt Peak	Spacewatch	·	1.2 km	MPC · JPL
814558	2008 TN_{102}	—	October 6, 2008	Kitt Peak	Spacewatch	PHO	900 m	MPC · JPL
814559	2008 TW_{102}	—	September 20, 2008	Mount Lemmon	Mount Lemmon Survey	·	480 m	MPC · JPL
814560	2008 TF_{120}	—	September 6, 2008	Mount Lemmon	Mount Lemmon Survey	EUN	730 m	MPC · JPL
814561	2008 TB_{121}	—	September 22, 2008	Kitt Peak	Spacewatch	·	1.4 km	MPC · JPL
814562	2008 TT_{123}	—	September 24, 2008	Kitt Peak	Spacewatch	·	670 m	MPC · JPL
814563	2008 TV_{126}	—	September 22, 2008	Kitt Peak	Spacewatch	·	1.2 km	MPC · JPL
814564	2008 TK_{127}	—	October 8, 2008	Mount Lemmon	Mount Lemmon Survey	·	940 m	MPC · JPL
814565	2008 TC_{128}	—	September 23, 2008	Kitt Peak	Spacewatch	·	1.2 km	MPC · JPL
814566	2008 TC_{135}	—	September 22, 2008	Kitt Peak	Spacewatch	·	1.2 km	MPC · JPL
814567	2008 TP_{135}	—	September 26, 2008	Kitt Peak	Spacewatch	·	930 m	MPC · JPL
814568	2008 TX_{139}	—	September 23, 2008	Kitt Peak	Spacewatch	·	460 m	MPC · JPL
814569	2008 TH_{141}	—	October 9, 2008	Mount Lemmon	Mount Lemmon Survey	·	700 m	MPC · JPL
814570	2008 TS_{147}	—	October 9, 2008	Mount Lemmon	Mount Lemmon Survey	3:2	3.1 km	MPC · JPL
814571	2008 TH_{149}	—	September 29, 2008	Catalina	CSS	AGN	830 m	MPC · JPL
814572	2008 TS_{149}	—	September 2, 2008	Kitt Peak	Spacewatch	·	2.0 km	MPC · JPL
814573	2008 TL_{152}	—	September 3, 2008	Kitt Peak	Spacewatch	·	670 m	MPC · JPL
814574	2008 TP_{155}	—	October 9, 2008	Mount Lemmon	Mount Lemmon Survey	JUN	830 m	MPC · JPL
814575	2008 TR_{156}	—	October 8, 2008	Mount Lemmon	Mount Lemmon Survey	·	2.7 km	MPC · JPL
814576	2008 TY_{167}	—	October 1, 2008	Catalina	CSS	(895)	3.1 km	MPC · JPL
814577	2008 TJ_{170}	—	October 9, 2008	Kitt Peak	Spacewatch	·	2.4 km	MPC · JPL
814578	2008 TM_{171}	—	October 2, 2008	Mount Lemmon	Mount Lemmon Survey	·	1.4 km	MPC · JPL
814579	2008 TZ_{179}	—	September 20, 2008	Catalina	CSS	TIN	880 m	MPC · JPL
814580	2008 TA_{181}	—	October 9, 2008	Catalina	CSS	·	1.2 km	MPC · JPL
814581	2008 TJ_{185}	—	October 6, 2008	Kitt Peak	Spacewatch	·	790 m	MPC · JPL
814582	2008 TV_{191}	—	October 8, 2008	Mount Lemmon	Mount Lemmon Survey	·	660 m	MPC · JPL
814583	2008 TF_{197}	—	November 10, 2013	Kitt Peak	Spacewatch	·	1.3 km	MPC · JPL
814584	2008 TH_{197}	—	October 8, 2008	Mount Lemmon	Mount Lemmon Survey	·	1.3 km	MPC · JPL
814585	2008 TD_{201}	—	October 6, 2008	Kitt Peak	Spacewatch	·	1.0 km	MPC · JPL
814586	2008 TA_{202}	—	October 8, 2008	Mount Lemmon	Mount Lemmon Survey	·	1.2 km	MPC · JPL
814587	2008 TM_{202}	—	October 7, 2008	Mount Lemmon	Mount Lemmon Survey	·	1.5 km	MPC · JPL
814588	2008 TA_{203}	—	October 6, 2008	Mount Lemmon	Mount Lemmon Survey	·	1.2 km	MPC · JPL
814589	2008 TV_{205}	—	August 31, 2017	Mount Lemmon	Mount Lemmon Survey	·	1.4 km	MPC · JPL
814590	2008 TH_{206}	—	October 2, 2008	Mount Lemmon	Mount Lemmon Survey	·	780 m	MPC · JPL
814591	2008 TY_{208}	—	March 4, 2017	Haleakala	Pan-STARRS 1	·	2.7 km	MPC · JPL
814592	2008 TM_{209}	—	August 21, 2015	Haleakala	Pan-STARRS 1	·	660 m	MPC · JPL
814593	2008 TG_{215}	—	July 30, 2015	Haleakala	Pan-STARRS 1	·	690 m	MPC · JPL
814594	2008 TW_{219}	—	October 8, 2008	Kitt Peak	Spacewatch	·	1.3 km	MPC · JPL
814595	2008 TK_{220}	—	October 6, 2008	Mount Lemmon	Mount Lemmon Survey	·	1.3 km	MPC · JPL
814596	2008 TJ_{224}	—	October 6, 2008	Mount Lemmon	Mount Lemmon Survey	·	720 m	MPC · JPL
814597	2008 TJ_{226}	—	October 1, 2008	Mount Lemmon	Mount Lemmon Survey	·	840 m	MPC · JPL
814598	2008 TX_{227}	—	October 1, 2008	Mount Lemmon	Mount Lemmon Survey	·	1.1 km	MPC · JPL
814599	2008 TN_{228}	—	October 3, 2008	Kitt Peak	Spacewatch	·	1.3 km	MPC · JPL
814600	2008 TB_{231}	—	October 8, 2008	Kitt Peak	Spacewatch	·	920 m	MPC · JPL

== 814601–814700 ==
back to top

Designation			Discovery			Properties		Ref
Permanent	Provisional	Named after	Date	Site	Discoverer(s)	Category	Diam.	Ref
814601	2008 TF_{232}	—	October 1, 2008	Mount Lemmon	Mount Lemmon Survey	·	1.9 km	MPC · JPL
814602	2008 TA_{234}	—	October 2, 2008	Kitt Peak	Spacewatch	·	470 m	MPC · JPL
814603	2008 TU_{234}	—	October 10, 2008	Mount Lemmon	Mount Lemmon Survey	·	1.0 km	MPC · JPL
814604	2008 TQ_{238}	—	October 8, 2008	Mount Lemmon	Mount Lemmon Survey	·	600 m	MPC · JPL
814605	2008 TH_{240}	—	October 2, 2008	Kitt Peak	Spacewatch	·	830 m	MPC · JPL
814606	2008 TN_{240}	—	October 1, 2008	Mount Lemmon	Mount Lemmon Survey	·	1.1 km	MPC · JPL
814607	2008 UA_{6}	—	October 23, 2008	Kitt Peak	Spacewatch	·	660 m	MPC · JPL
814608	2008 UR_{8}	—	September 5, 2008	Kitt Peak	Spacewatch	·	530 m	MPC · JPL
814609	2008 UV_{9}	—	September 20, 2001	Socorro	LINEAR	·	390 m	MPC · JPL
814610	2008 UJ_{12}	—	September 24, 2008	Mount Lemmon	Mount Lemmon Survey	LIX	2.9 km	MPC · JPL
814611	2008 UK_{15}	—	September 4, 2008	Kitt Peak	Spacewatch	·	2.3 km	MPC · JPL
814612	2008 UP_{16}	—	September 20, 2008	Kitt Peak	Spacewatch	·	1.3 km	MPC · JPL
814613	2008 UV_{24}	—	September 29, 2008	Kitt Peak	Spacewatch	·	2.5 km	MPC · JPL
814614	2008 UH_{27}	—	October 6, 2008	Kitt Peak	Spacewatch	·	700 m	MPC · JPL
814615	2008 UO_{33}	—	October 20, 2008	Mount Lemmon	Mount Lemmon Survey	·	730 m	MPC · JPL
814616	2008 UQ_{37}	—	October 20, 2008	Kitt Peak	Spacewatch	·	1.6 km	MPC · JPL
814617	2008 UZ_{38}	—	October 20, 2008	Kitt Peak	Spacewatch	·	870 m	MPC · JPL
814618	2008 UP_{39}	—	October 8, 2008	Kitt Peak	Spacewatch	THM	1.8 km	MPC · JPL
814619	2008 UE_{41}	—	October 20, 2008	Kitt Peak	Spacewatch	·	780 m	MPC · JPL
814620	2008 UB_{42}	—	October 20, 2008	Kitt Peak	Spacewatch	AEO	890 m	MPC · JPL
814621	2008 UU_{44}	—	September 21, 2008	Kitt Peak	Spacewatch	·	520 m	MPC · JPL
814622	2008 UJ_{48}	—	October 20, 2008	Mount Lemmon	Mount Lemmon Survey	·	2.0 km	MPC · JPL
814623	2008 UP_{48}	—	September 22, 2008	Mount Lemmon	Mount Lemmon Survey	·	520 m	MPC · JPL
814624	2008 UZ_{49}	—	October 7, 2008	Kitt Peak	Spacewatch	·	500 m	MPC · JPL
814625	2008 UF_{51}	—	October 2, 2008	Kitt Peak	Spacewatch	·	1.9 km	MPC · JPL
814626	2008 UT_{52}	—	October 20, 2008	Mount Lemmon	Mount Lemmon Survey	·	1.1 km	MPC · JPL
814627	2008 UR_{57}	—	October 21, 2008	Kitt Peak	Spacewatch	·	480 m	MPC · JPL
814628	2008 US_{62}	—	October 21, 2008	Kitt Peak	Spacewatch	·	600 m	MPC · JPL
814629	2008 UJ_{63}	—	October 21, 2008	Kitt Peak	Spacewatch	·	1.5 km	MPC · JPL
814630	2008 UN_{64}	—	October 8, 2008	Catalina	CSS	PHO	780 m	MPC · JPL
814631	2008 UT_{68}	—	October 6, 2008	Mount Lemmon	Mount Lemmon Survey	·	960 m	MPC · JPL
814632	2008 UX_{69}	—	September 22, 2008	Kitt Peak	Spacewatch	·	570 m	MPC · JPL
814633	2008 UA_{87}	—	October 1, 2008	Kitt Peak	Spacewatch	·	1.1 km	MPC · JPL
814634	2008 UE_{99}	—	October 23, 2008	Kitt Peak	Spacewatch	·	820 m	MPC · JPL
814635	2008 UM_{104}	—	August 22, 2004	Kitt Peak	Spacewatch	·	820 m	MPC · JPL
814636	2008 UL_{130}	—	September 22, 2008	Kitt Peak	Spacewatch	·	530 m	MPC · JPL
814637	2008 UX_{139}	—	October 23, 2008	Kitt Peak	Spacewatch	NEM	1.5 km	MPC · JPL
814638	2008 UQ_{144}	—	October 23, 2008	Kitt Peak	Spacewatch	·	970 m	MPC · JPL
814639	2008 UW_{146}	—	October 23, 2008	Kitt Peak	Spacewatch	·	890 m	MPC · JPL
814640	2008 UN_{152}	—	October 23, 2008	Mount Lemmon	Mount Lemmon Survey	·	470 m	MPC · JPL
814641	2008 UM_{162}	—	October 24, 2008	Kitt Peak	Spacewatch	·	890 m	MPC · JPL
814642	2008 UO_{164}	—	September 26, 2008	Kitt Peak	Spacewatch	AEO	890 m	MPC · JPL
814643	2008 UA_{165}	—	October 8, 2008	Kitt Peak	Spacewatch	SUL	1.6 km	MPC · JPL
814644	2008 UU_{165}	—	October 6, 2008	Kitt Peak	Spacewatch	LEO	1.1 km	MPC · JPL
814645	2008 UQ_{166}	—	September 9, 2008	Mount Lemmon	Mount Lemmon Survey	·	620 m	MPC · JPL
814646	2008 UW_{171}	—	October 24, 2008	Kitt Peak	Spacewatch	·	2.7 km	MPC · JPL
814647	2008 UH_{173}	—	August 12, 1997	Kitt Peak	Spacewatch	·	800 m	MPC · JPL
814648	2008 UB_{178}	—	October 24, 2008	Mount Lemmon	Mount Lemmon Survey	·	750 m	MPC · JPL
814649	2008 UQ_{182}	—	October 24, 2008	Mount Lemmon	Mount Lemmon Survey	·	2.5 km	MPC · JPL
814650	2008 UG_{183}	—	September 23, 2008	Kitt Peak	Spacewatch	·	1.2 km	MPC · JPL
814651	2008 UP_{184}	—	October 3, 2008	Mount Lemmon	Mount Lemmon Survey	·	630 m	MPC · JPL
814652	2008 UC_{187}	—	October 24, 2008	Kitt Peak	Spacewatch	·	870 m	MPC · JPL
814653	2008 UD_{190}	—	October 9, 2008	Mount Lemmon	Mount Lemmon Survey	·	900 m	MPC · JPL
814654	2008 UD_{193}	—	October 25, 2008	Mount Lemmon	Mount Lemmon Survey	·	1.9 km	MPC · JPL
814655	2008 UW_{197}	—	October 27, 2008	Kitt Peak	Spacewatch	·	1.5 km	MPC · JPL
814656	2008 UH_{216}	—	October 9, 2008	Kitt Peak	Spacewatch	·	1.3 km	MPC · JPL
814657	2008 UJ_{216}	—	October 24, 2008	Catalina	CSS	JUN	870 m	MPC · JPL
814658	2008 UB_{221}	—	October 25, 2008	Kitt Peak	Spacewatch	·	430 m	MPC · JPL
814659	2008 UE_{224}	—	October 25, 2008	Kitt Peak	Spacewatch	·	1.5 km	MPC · JPL
814660	2008 UB_{231}	—	September 4, 2008	Kitt Peak	Spacewatch	·	1.3 km	MPC · JPL
814661	2008 UG_{242}	—	October 26, 2008	Kitt Peak	Spacewatch	KON	1.5 km	MPC · JPL
814662	2008 UH_{252}	—	September 16, 2003	Kitt Peak	Spacewatch	·	1.1 km	MPC · JPL
814663	2008 UQ_{255}	—	October 6, 2008	Mount Lemmon	Mount Lemmon Survey	·	1.5 km	MPC · JPL
814664	2008 UN_{269}	—	September 6, 2008	Mount Lemmon	Mount Lemmon Survey	·	650 m	MPC · JPL
814665	2008 UF_{271}	—	October 28, 2008	Kitt Peak	Spacewatch	·	1.0 km	MPC · JPL
814666	2008 UV_{271}	—	October 28, 2008	Kitt Peak	Spacewatch	·	1.7 km	MPC · JPL
814667	2008 UG_{273}	—	October 28, 2008	Mount Lemmon	Mount Lemmon Survey	·	710 m	MPC · JPL
814668	2008 UK_{285}	—	October 28, 2008	Kitt Peak	Spacewatch	·	440 m	MPC · JPL
814669	2008 UJ_{288}	—	October 28, 2008	Mount Lemmon	Mount Lemmon Survey	H	370 m	MPC · JPL
814670	2008 UJ_{294}	—	October 29, 2008	Kitt Peak	Spacewatch	·	2.3 km	MPC · JPL
814671	2008 UE_{302}	—	October 21, 2008	Kitt Peak	Spacewatch	·	1.0 km	MPC · JPL
814672	2008 UE_{307}	—	October 30, 2008	Kitt Peak	Spacewatch	·	910 m	MPC · JPL
814673	2008 UW_{308}	—	October 30, 2008	Kitt Peak	Spacewatch	·	2.6 km	MPC · JPL
814674	2008 UG_{310}	—	October 30, 2008	Catalina	CSS	·	800 m	MPC · JPL
814675	2008 UL_{319}	—	October 10, 2008	Mount Lemmon	Mount Lemmon Survey	·	1.3 km	MPC · JPL
814676	2008 UX_{373}	—	October 15, 2004	Mount Lemmon	Mount Lemmon Survey	·	950 m	MPC · JPL
814677	2008 UL_{375}	—	October 30, 2008	Kitt Peak	Spacewatch	·	1.4 km	MPC · JPL
814678	2008 UE_{376}	—	March 19, 2010	Zelenchukskaya	T. V. Krjačko, B. Satovski	·	1.5 km	MPC · JPL
814679	2008 UQ_{376}	—	October 21, 2008	Kitt Peak	Spacewatch	(5)	1.0 km	MPC · JPL
814680	2008 UF_{378}	—	October 20, 2008	Kitt Peak	Spacewatch	·	1.3 km	MPC · JPL
814681	2008 UZ_{379}	—	October 20, 2008	Mount Lemmon	Mount Lemmon Survey	·	1.2 km	MPC · JPL
814682	2008 UJ_{380}	—	October 8, 2004	Kitt Peak	Spacewatch	·	770 m	MPC · JPL
814683	2008 UK_{380}	—	May 7, 2014	Haleakala	Pan-STARRS 1	·	860 m	MPC · JPL
814684	2008 US_{380}	—	May 12, 2015	Mount Lemmon	Mount Lemmon Survey	HNS	780 m	MPC · JPL
814685	2008 UT_{380}	—	October 27, 2008	Kitt Peak	Spacewatch	3:2	3.2 km	MPC · JPL
814686	2008 UA_{383}	—	September 19, 2014	Haleakala	Pan-STARRS 1	·	2.5 km	MPC · JPL
814687	2008 UK_{384}	—	October 17, 2012	Haleakala	Pan-STARRS 1	·	640 m	MPC · JPL
814688	2008 UO_{384}	—	April 2, 2011	Kitt Peak	Spacewatch	PHO	820 m	MPC · JPL
814689	2008 UM_{385}	—	October 29, 2008	Kitt Peak	Spacewatch	·	680 m	MPC · JPL
814690	2008 UT_{385}	—	October 28, 2008	Kitt Peak	Spacewatch	·	1.3 km	MPC · JPL
814691	2008 UN_{386}	—	October 27, 2008	Mount Lemmon	Mount Lemmon Survey	·	1 km	MPC · JPL
814692	2008 UV_{386}	—	October 25, 2008	Mount Lemmon	Mount Lemmon Survey	H	480 m	MPC · JPL
814693	2008 UJ_{387}	—	June 27, 2015	Haleakala	Pan-STARRS 1	·	920 m	MPC · JPL
814694	2008 UL_{387}	—	October 23, 2008	Mount Lemmon	Mount Lemmon Survey	TIR	2.2 km	MPC · JPL
814695	2008 US_{387}	—	April 24, 2014	Mount Lemmon	Mount Lemmon Survey	V	540 m	MPC · JPL
814696	2008 UA_{389}	—	August 9, 2004	Siding Spring	SSS	·	690 m	MPC · JPL
814697	2008 UT_{389}	—	October 21, 2008	Kitt Peak	Spacewatch	VER	2.3 km	MPC · JPL
814698	2008 US_{391}	—	November 18, 2016	Mount Lemmon	Mount Lemmon Survey	·	1.5 km	MPC · JPL
814699	2008 UH_{394}	—	April 10, 2014	Haleakala	Pan-STARRS 1	·	1.1 km	MPC · JPL
814700	2008 UJ_{396}	—	August 21, 2015	Haleakala	Pan-STARRS 1	NYS	810 m	MPC · JPL

== 814701–814800 ==
back to top

Designation			Discovery			Properties		Ref
Permanent	Provisional	Named after	Date	Site	Discoverer(s)	Category	Diam.	Ref
814701	2008 UD_{399}	—	May 30, 2014	Mount Lemmon	Mount Lemmon Survey	·	500 m	MPC · JPL
814702	2008 UW_{401}	—	February 10, 2016	Haleakala	Pan-STARRS 1	·	2.0 km	MPC · JPL
814703	2008 UJ_{403}	—	April 22, 2007	Kitt Peak	Spacewatch	PHO	750 m	MPC · JPL
814704	2008 UF_{405}	—	October 22, 2008	Mount Lemmon	Mount Lemmon Survey	H	440 m	MPC · JPL
814705	2008 UG_{405}	—	October 21, 2008	Kitt Peak	Spacewatch	·	450 m	MPC · JPL
814706	2008 UL_{406}	—	October 20, 2008	Mount Lemmon	Mount Lemmon Survey	·	580 m	MPC · JPL
814707	2008 US_{406}	—	October 23, 2008	Kitt Peak	Spacewatch	NYS	600 m	MPC · JPL
814708	2008 UY_{406}	—	October 24, 2008	Kitt Peak	Spacewatch	·	1.2 km	MPC · JPL
814709	2008 UA_{407}	—	October 28, 2008	Kitt Peak	Spacewatch	·	2.0 km	MPC · JPL
814710	2008 UO_{407}	—	October 29, 2008	Kitt Peak	Spacewatch	·	640 m	MPC · JPL
814711	2008 UN_{410}	—	October 27, 2008	Mount Lemmon	Mount Lemmon Survey	·	960 m	MPC · JPL
814712	2008 UR_{411}	—	October 27, 2008	Mount Lemmon	Mount Lemmon Survey	·	880 m	MPC · JPL
814713	2008 UT_{412}	—	October 30, 2008	Kitt Peak	Spacewatch	V	510 m	MPC · JPL
814714	2008 UP_{417}	—	October 28, 2008	Mount Lemmon	Mount Lemmon Survey	·	2.4 km	MPC · JPL
814715	2008 UP_{418}	—	October 22, 2008	Kitt Peak	Spacewatch	HNS	860 m	MPC · JPL
814716	2008 UY_{424}	—	October 24, 2008	Kitt Peak	Spacewatch	·	780 m	MPC · JPL
814717	2008 VX_{6}	—	September 27, 2008	Mount Lemmon	Mount Lemmon Survey	·	1.1 km	MPC · JPL
814718	2008 VE_{12}	—	November 2, 2008	Mount Lemmon	Mount Lemmon Survey	H	430 m	MPC · JPL
814719	2008 VL_{15}	—	November 1, 2008	Kitt Peak	Spacewatch	·	490 m	MPC · JPL
814720	2008 VE_{17}	—	September 9, 2008	Mount Lemmon	Mount Lemmon Survey	·	880 m	MPC · JPL
814721	2008 VU_{23}	—	September 9, 2008	Mount Lemmon	Mount Lemmon Survey	·	700 m	MPC · JPL
814722	2008 VO_{35}	—	November 2, 2008	Kitt Peak	Spacewatch	·	1.5 km	MPC · JPL
814723	2008 VX_{37}	—	October 6, 2008	Mount Lemmon	Mount Lemmon Survey	·	470 m	MPC · JPL
814724	2008 VK_{38}	—	October 21, 2008	Mount Lemmon	Mount Lemmon Survey	·	1.6 km	MPC · JPL
814725	2008 VB_{41}	—	November 28, 2000	Kitt Peak	Spacewatch	·	820 m	MPC · JPL
814726	2008 VL_{41}	—	September 28, 2008	Mount Lemmon	Mount Lemmon Survey	·	2.6 km	MPC · JPL
814727	2008 VL_{44}	—	November 3, 2008	Mount Lemmon	Mount Lemmon Survey	·	2.5 km	MPC · JPL
814728	2008 VD_{52}	—	October 7, 2008	Kitt Peak	Spacewatch	·	1.2 km	MPC · JPL
814729	2008 VN_{56}	—	October 21, 2008	Kitt Peak	Spacewatch	·	1.5 km	MPC · JPL
814730	2008 VU_{62}	—	October 31, 2008	Kitt Peak	Spacewatch	·	900 m	MPC · JPL
814731	2008 VG_{83}	—	November 2, 2008	Mount Lemmon	Mount Lemmon Survey	MRX	810 m	MPC · JPL
814732	2008 VN_{83}	—	December 10, 2013	Mount Lemmon	Mount Lemmon Survey	DOR	1.9 km	MPC · JPL
814733	2008 VR_{84}	—	November 8, 2008	Kitt Peak	Spacewatch	(5)	1.0 km	MPC · JPL
814734	2008 VL_{85}	—	November 3, 2008	Mount Lemmon	Mount Lemmon Survey	GEF	800 m	MPC · JPL
814735	2008 VX_{86}	—	November 7, 2008	Mount Lemmon	Mount Lemmon Survey	·	520 m	MPC · JPL
814736	2008 VA_{90}	—	November 1, 2008	Mount Lemmon	Mount Lemmon Survey	·	1.0 km	MPC · JPL
814737	2008 VF_{95}	—	January 3, 2014	Kitt Peak	Spacewatch	·	1.4 km	MPC · JPL
814738	2008 VG_{95}	—	November 8, 2008	Kitt Peak	Spacewatch	·	410 m	MPC · JPL
814739	2008 VC_{100}	—	November 1, 2008	Mount Lemmon	Mount Lemmon Survey	·	590 m	MPC · JPL
814740	2008 VR_{100}	—	November 3, 2008	Kitt Peak	Spacewatch	·	680 m	MPC · JPL
814741	2008 VM_{101}	—	November 7, 2008	Mount Lemmon	Mount Lemmon Survey	·	1.2 km	MPC · JPL
814742	2008 VS_{102}	—	November 7, 2008	Mount Lemmon	Mount Lemmon Survey	·	670 m	MPC · JPL
814743	2008 VT_{102}	—	November 8, 2008	Mount Lemmon	Mount Lemmon Survey	RAF	780 m	MPC · JPL
814744	2008 VE_{103}	—	November 9, 2008	Mount Lemmon	Mount Lemmon Survey	·	1.1 km	MPC · JPL
814745	2008 VG_{103}	—	November 2, 2008	Mount Lemmon	Mount Lemmon Survey	·	930 m	MPC · JPL
814746	2008 VC_{104}	—	November 2, 2008	Mount Lemmon	Mount Lemmon Survey	·	1.6 km	MPC · JPL
814747	2008 VL_{104}	—	November 2, 2008	Catalina	CSS	JUN	830 m	MPC · JPL
814748	2008 VS_{104}	—	November 7, 2008	Mount Lemmon	Mount Lemmon Survey	·	730 m	MPC · JPL
814749	2008 VH_{105}	—	October 24, 2008	Catalina	CSS	H	400 m	MPC · JPL
814750	2008 VR_{105}	—	November 3, 2008	Kitt Peak	Spacewatch	·	870 m	MPC · JPL
814751	2008 VN_{109}	—	November 7, 2008	Mount Lemmon	Mount Lemmon Survey	·	450 m	MPC · JPL
814752	2008 WV_{3}	—	October 8, 2008	Catalina	CSS	·	850 m	MPC · JPL
814753	2008 WY_{4}	—	September 28, 2008	Mount Lemmon	Mount Lemmon Survey	·	2.6 km	MPC · JPL
814754	2008 WZ_{16}	—	October 27, 2008	Kitt Peak	Spacewatch	·	2.1 km	MPC · JPL
814755	2008 WH_{29}	—	November 7, 2008	Mount Lemmon	Mount Lemmon Survey	·	840 m	MPC · JPL
814756	2008 WB_{30}	—	November 19, 2008	Mount Lemmon	Mount Lemmon Survey	·	920 m	MPC · JPL
814757	2008 WC_{33}	—	July 29, 2008	Mount Lemmon	Mount Lemmon Survey	·	3.0 km	MPC · JPL
814758	2008 WH_{36}	—	November 7, 2008	Mount Lemmon	Mount Lemmon Survey	PHO	580 m	MPC · JPL
814759	2008 WH_{37}	—	September 24, 2008	Mount Lemmon	Mount Lemmon Survey	·	1.8 km	MPC · JPL
814760	2008 WG_{43}	—	October 27, 2008	Kitt Peak	Spacewatch	·	610 m	MPC · JPL
814761	2008 WA_{53}	—	November 20, 2003	Kitt Peak	Spacewatch	H	470 m	MPC · JPL
814762	2008 WA_{54}	—	October 31, 2008	Kitt Peak	Spacewatch	·	520 m	MPC · JPL
814763	2008 WG_{57}	—	November 20, 2008	Mount Lemmon	Mount Lemmon Survey	·	2.6 km	MPC · JPL
814764	2008 WC_{76}	—	November 20, 2008	Kitt Peak	Spacewatch	·	780 m	MPC · JPL
814765	2008 WC_{81}	—	September 29, 2008	Mount Lemmon	Mount Lemmon Survey	·	890 m	MPC · JPL
814766	2008 WL_{100}	—	September 9, 2008	Mount Lemmon	Mount Lemmon Survey	·	550 m	MPC · JPL
814767	2008 WE_{106}	—	September 24, 2008	Mount Lemmon	Mount Lemmon Survey	·	1.5 km	MPC · JPL
814768	2008 WR_{106}	—	October 21, 2008	Kitt Peak	Spacewatch	·	620 m	MPC · JPL
814769	2008 WB_{111}	—	December 25, 2005	Kitt Peak	Spacewatch	·	420 m	MPC · JPL
814770	2008 WL_{117}	—	November 17, 2004	Campo Imperatore	CINEOS	·	900 m	MPC · JPL
814771	2008 WF_{124}	—	November 19, 2008	Kitt Peak	Spacewatch	H	450 m	MPC · JPL
814772	2008 WG_{129}	—	November 19, 2008	Kitt Peak	Spacewatch	·	2.5 km	MPC · JPL
814773	2008 WB_{138}	—	November 30, 2008	Socorro	LINEAR	(5)	970 m	MPC · JPL
814774	2008 WG_{148}	—	August 26, 2012	Haleakala	Pan-STARRS 1	·	1.2 km	MPC · JPL
814775	2008 WM_{148}	—	November 21, 2008	Kitt Peak	Spacewatch	·	1.3 km	MPC · JPL
814776	2008 WA_{150}	—	July 25, 2015	Haleakala	Pan-STARRS 1	·	880 m	MPC · JPL
814777	2008 WY_{150}	—	November 19, 2008	Kitt Peak	Spacewatch	VER	2.0 km	MPC · JPL
814778	2008 WH_{151}	—	November 17, 2008	Kitt Peak	Spacewatch	PHO	710 m	MPC · JPL
814779	2008 WM_{151}	—	March 16, 2010	Kitt Peak	Spacewatch	·	1.2 km	MPC · JPL
814780	2008 WT_{152}	—	November 24, 2008	Kitt Peak	Spacewatch	·	690 m	MPC · JPL
814781	2008 WN_{153}	—	May 10, 2015	Mount Lemmon	Mount Lemmon Survey	·	1.4 km	MPC · JPL
814782	2008 WD_{154}	—	November 23, 2008	Kitt Peak	Spacewatch	V	520 m	MPC · JPL
814783	2008 WM_{156}	—	November 19, 2008	Kitt Peak	Spacewatch	PHO	640 m	MPC · JPL
814784	2008 WK_{157}	—	November 19, 2008	Mount Lemmon	Mount Lemmon Survey	·	570 m	MPC · JPL
814785	2008 WA_{158}	—	November 24, 2008	Mount Lemmon	Mount Lemmon Survey	·	1.5 km	MPC · JPL
814786	2008 WU_{159}	—	November 19, 2008	Kitt Peak	Spacewatch	·	930 m	MPC · JPL
814787	2008 WN_{160}	—	November 20, 2008	Kitt Peak	Spacewatch	·	950 m	MPC · JPL
814788	2008 WW_{161}	—	November 20, 2008	Kitt Peak	Spacewatch	·	810 m	MPC · JPL
814789	2008 WX_{161}	—	November 21, 2008	Kitt Peak	Spacewatch	·	1.2 km	MPC · JPL
814790	2008 WV_{162}	—	November 21, 2008	Kitt Peak	Spacewatch	·	1.5 km	MPC · JPL
814791	2008 XS_{13}	—	November 21, 2008	Mount Lemmon	Mount Lemmon Survey	·	1.2 km	MPC · JPL
814792	2008 XL_{26}	—	October 30, 2008	Kitt Peak	Spacewatch	H	360 m	MPC · JPL
814793	2008 XZ_{35}	—	December 2, 2008	Kitt Peak	Spacewatch	·	880 m	MPC · JPL
814794	2008 XN_{42}	—	December 2, 2008	Kitt Peak	Spacewatch	·	1.2 km	MPC · JPL
814795	2008 XB_{44}	—	October 23, 2008	Kitt Peak	Spacewatch	JUN	740 m	MPC · JPL
814796	2008 XZ_{45}	—	November 19, 2008	Kitt Peak	Spacewatch	·	1.4 km	MPC · JPL
814797	2008 XR_{56}	—	November 19, 2008	Kitt Peak	Spacewatch	·	1.1 km	MPC · JPL
814798	2008 XB_{60}	—	December 5, 2008	Kitt Peak	Spacewatch	(18466)	1.6 km	MPC · JPL
814799	2008 XN_{60}	—	December 3, 2008	Mount Lemmon	Mount Lemmon Survey	·	1.2 km	MPC · JPL
814800	2008 XE_{64}	—	May 19, 2015	Haleakala	Pan-STARRS 1	·	1.1 km	MPC · JPL

== 814801–814900 ==
back to top

Designation			Discovery			Properties		Ref
Permanent	Provisional	Named after	Date	Site	Discoverer(s)	Category	Diam.	Ref
814801	2008 YG_{5}	—	November 16, 1995	Kitt Peak	Spacewatch	·	1.1 km	MPC · JPL
814802	2008 YM_{10}	—	November 21, 2008	Kitt Peak	Spacewatch	·	1.1 km	MPC · JPL
814803	2008 YC_{14}	—	November 6, 2008	Mount Lemmon	Mount Lemmon Survey	·	730 m	MPC · JPL
814804	2008 YH_{15}	—	December 21, 2008	Mount Lemmon	Mount Lemmon Survey	·	2.1 km	MPC · JPL
814805	2008 YU_{21}	—	December 21, 2008	Mount Lemmon	Mount Lemmon Survey	·	1.5 km	MPC · JPL
814806	2008 YT_{24}	—	November 19, 2008	Kitt Peak	Spacewatch	·	980 m	MPC · JPL
814807	2008 YD_{40}	—	December 29, 2008	Mount Lemmon	Mount Lemmon Survey	LIX	2.3 km	MPC · JPL
814808	2008 YF_{42}	—	December 2, 2008	Kitt Peak	Spacewatch	NYS	840 m	MPC · JPL
814809	2008 YB_{43}	—	December 21, 2008	Mount Lemmon	Mount Lemmon Survey	·	640 m	MPC · JPL
814810	2008 YJ_{49}	—	December 29, 2008	Mount Lemmon	Mount Lemmon Survey	·	510 m	MPC · JPL
814811	2008 YP_{52}	—	May 1, 2006	Mauna Kea	P. A. Wiegert	·	690 m	MPC · JPL
814812	2008 YD_{53}	—	December 29, 2008	Mount Lemmon	Mount Lemmon Survey	·	2.2 km	MPC · JPL
814813	2008 YS_{53}	—	December 29, 2008	Mount Lemmon	Mount Lemmon Survey	·	1.7 km	MPC · JPL
814814	2008 YJ_{61}	—	December 4, 2008	Mount Lemmon	Mount Lemmon Survey	H	470 m	MPC · JPL
814815	2008 YQ_{71}	—	October 14, 2004	Kitt Peak	Spacewatch	·	770 m	MPC · JPL
814816	2008 YA_{72}	—	December 30, 2008	Kitt Peak	Spacewatch	EOS	1.4 km	MPC · JPL
814817	2008 YW_{73}	—	December 22, 2008	Kitt Peak	Spacewatch	·	1.6 km	MPC · JPL
814818	2008 YO_{75}	—	December 30, 2008	Mount Lemmon	Mount Lemmon Survey	·	1.1 km	MPC · JPL
814819	2008 YM_{82}	—	November 20, 2008	Mount Lemmon	Mount Lemmon Survey	·	1.1 km	MPC · JPL
814820	2008 YW_{88}	—	December 21, 2008	Mount Lemmon	Mount Lemmon Survey	·	2.6 km	MPC · JPL
814821	2008 YL_{95}	—	December 21, 2008	Kitt Peak	Spacewatch	·	1.9 km	MPC · JPL
814822	2008 YO_{110}	—	December 4, 2008	Mount Lemmon	Mount Lemmon Survey	·	1.4 km	MPC · JPL
814823	2008 YC_{112}	—	November 22, 2008	Kitt Peak	Spacewatch	·	1.3 km	MPC · JPL
814824	2008 YE_{130}	—	December 31, 2008	Kitt Peak	Spacewatch	·	440 m	MPC · JPL
814825	2008 YZ_{130}	—	November 7, 2008	Mount Lemmon	Mount Lemmon Survey	·	1.5 km	MPC · JPL
814826	2008 YG_{131}	—	December 31, 2008	Mount Lemmon	Mount Lemmon Survey	·	530 m	MPC · JPL
814827	2008 YQ_{138}	—	December 22, 2008	Mount Lemmon	Mount Lemmon Survey	·	540 m	MPC · JPL
814828	2008 YS_{143}	—	December 30, 2008	Kitt Peak	Spacewatch	NYS	780 m	MPC · JPL
814829	2008 YA_{147}	—	September 22, 2003	Palomar	NEAT	·	1.9 km	MPC · JPL
814830	2008 YC_{147}	—	December 31, 2008	Kitt Peak	Spacewatch	·	500 m	MPC · JPL
814831	2008 YW_{149}	—	December 21, 2008	Kitt Peak	Spacewatch	·	730 m	MPC · JPL
814832	2008 YK_{177}	—	December 21, 2008	Catalina	CSS	·	1.3 km	MPC · JPL
814833	2008 YX_{177}	—	December 30, 2008	Mount Lemmon	Mount Lemmon Survey	·	460 m	MPC · JPL
814834	2008 YQ_{178}	—	March 5, 2013	Mount Lemmon	Mount Lemmon Survey	·	720 m	MPC · JPL
814835	2008 YP_{179}	—	December 22, 2008	Mount Lemmon	Mount Lemmon Survey	·	810 m	MPC · JPL
814836	2008 YO_{180}	—	December 6, 2008	Kitt Peak	Spacewatch	JUN	840 m	MPC · JPL
814837	2008 YA_{181}	—	October 16, 2013	Mount Lemmon	Mount Lemmon Survey	H	420 m	MPC · JPL
814838	2008 YQ_{187}	—	December 21, 2008	Mount Lemmon	Mount Lemmon Survey	·	820 m	MPC · JPL
814839	2008 YT_{193}	—	December 22, 2008	Kitt Peak	Spacewatch	BRA	1.3 km	MPC · JPL
814840	2008 YM_{196}	—	December 22, 2008	Mount Lemmon	Mount Lemmon Survey	PHO	750 m	MPC · JPL
814841	2008 YP_{198}	—	December 22, 2008	Kitt Peak	Spacewatch	·	850 m	MPC · JPL
814842	2009 AS_{7}	—	January 1, 2009	Mount Lemmon	Mount Lemmon Survey	·	910 m	MPC · JPL
814843	2009 AU_{7}	—	January 1, 2009	Mount Lemmon	Mount Lemmon Survey	·	1.0 km	MPC · JPL
814844	2009 AZ_{9}	—	December 4, 2008	Mount Lemmon	Mount Lemmon Survey	·	1.9 km	MPC · JPL
814845	2009 AF_{28}	—	December 5, 2008	Mount Lemmon	Mount Lemmon Survey	·	1.3 km	MPC · JPL
814846	2009 AF_{38}	—	January 2, 2009	Kitt Peak	Spacewatch	·	460 m	MPC · JPL
814847	2009 AJ_{39}	—	December 22, 2008	Mount Lemmon	Mount Lemmon Survey	·	1.1 km	MPC · JPL
814848	2009 AO_{49}	—	January 1, 2009	Kitt Peak	Spacewatch	·	1.6 km	MPC · JPL
814849	2009 AO_{50}	—	January 2, 2009	Mount Lemmon	Mount Lemmon Survey	·	1.1 km	MPC · JPL
814850	2009 AE_{54}	—	November 18, 2011	Mount Lemmon	Mount Lemmon Survey	·	500 m	MPC · JPL
814851	2009 AC_{57}	—	January 1, 2009	Mount Lemmon	Mount Lemmon Survey	·	520 m	MPC · JPL
814852	2009 AQ_{57}	—	September 8, 2011	Kitt Peak	Spacewatch	·	800 m	MPC · JPL
814853	2009 AX_{60}	—	January 2, 2009	Kitt Peak	Spacewatch	·	750 m	MPC · JPL
814854	2009 AK_{61}	—	January 1, 2009	Kitt Peak	Spacewatch	·	460 m	MPC · JPL
814855	2009 AO_{62}	—	January 3, 2009	Mount Lemmon	Mount Lemmon Survey	·	1.1 km	MPC · JPL
814856	2009 BM_{3}	—	January 18, 2009	Socorro	LINEAR	T_{j} (2.98) · EUP	3.0 km	MPC · JPL
814857	2009 BC_{8}	—	December 22, 2008	Črni Vrh	Matičič, S.	·	2.0 km	MPC · JPL
814858	2009 BS_{15}	—	January 2, 2009	Kitt Peak	Spacewatch	·	810 m	MPC · JPL
814859	2009 BO_{29}	—	December 29, 2008	Kitt Peak	Spacewatch	·	860 m	MPC · JPL
814860	2009 BD_{33}	—	January 2, 2009	Mount Lemmon	Mount Lemmon Survey	NYS	840 m	MPC · JPL
814861	2009 BZ_{40}	—	January 16, 2009	Kitt Peak	Spacewatch	·	1.3 km	MPC · JPL
814862	2009 BX_{46}	—	December 22, 2008	Mount Lemmon	Mount Lemmon Survey	·	780 m	MPC · JPL
814863	2009 BJ_{55}	—	December 29, 2008	Mount Lemmon	Mount Lemmon Survey	·	450 m	MPC · JPL
814864	2009 BW_{56}	—	January 18, 2009	Kitt Peak	Spacewatch	·	520 m	MPC · JPL
814865	2009 BW_{92}	—	March 11, 2002	Palomar	NEAT	·	870 m	MPC · JPL
814866	2009 BT_{97}	—	January 25, 2009	Kitt Peak	Spacewatch	·	460 m	MPC · JPL
814867	2009 BL_{100}	—	January 15, 2009	Kitt Peak	Spacewatch	·	810 m	MPC · JPL
814868	2009 BZ_{101}	—	January 29, 2009	Mount Lemmon	Mount Lemmon Survey	·	580 m	MPC · JPL
814869	2009 BD_{144}	—	January 20, 2009	Kitt Peak	Spacewatch	·	650 m	MPC · JPL
814870	2009 BH_{148}	—	January 30, 2009	Mount Lemmon	Mount Lemmon Survey	·	780 m	MPC · JPL
814871	2009 BJ_{155}	—	December 30, 2008	Mount Lemmon	Mount Lemmon Survey	(5)	860 m	MPC · JPL
814872	2009 BW_{157}	—	January 31, 2009	Kitt Peak	Spacewatch	(5)	1.0 km	MPC · JPL
814873	2009 BG_{162}	—	January 20, 2009	Kitt Peak	Spacewatch	NYS	810 m	MPC · JPL
814874	2009 BP_{163}	—	January 17, 2009	Kitt Peak	Spacewatch	·	480 m	MPC · JPL
814875	2009 BJ_{174}	—	January 25, 2009	Kitt Peak	Spacewatch	·	1.6 km	MPC · JPL
814876	2009 BU_{180}	—	January 18, 2009	Kitt Peak	Spacewatch	·	520 m	MPC · JPL
814877	2009 BY_{183}	—	January 20, 2009	Catalina	CSS	·	1.3 km	MPC · JPL
814878	2009 BH_{194}	—	August 14, 2016	Haleakala	Pan-STARRS 1	GAL	1.2 km	MPC · JPL
814879	2009 BX_{195}	—	January 16, 2009	Mount Lemmon	Mount Lemmon Survey	EOS	1.7 km	MPC · JPL
814880	2009 BL_{196}	—	July 27, 2011	Haleakala	Pan-STARRS 1	·	930 m	MPC · JPL
814881	2009 BZ_{196}	—	January 31, 2009	Kitt Peak	Spacewatch	·	590 m	MPC · JPL
814882	2009 BC_{198}	—	January 21, 2009	Mount Lemmon	Mount Lemmon Survey	·	2.1 km	MPC · JPL
814883	2009 BE_{199}	—	November 3, 2012	Mount Lemmon	Mount Lemmon Survey	·	1.5 km	MPC · JPL
814884	2009 BX_{200}	—	December 1, 2008	Kitt Peak	Spacewatch	·	1.5 km	MPC · JPL
814885	2009 BS_{201}	—	November 13, 2017	Haleakala	Pan-STARRS 1	·	420 m	MPC · JPL
814886	2009 BT_{201}	—	September 9, 2015	Haleakala	Pan-STARRS 1	·	1.0 km	MPC · JPL
814887	2009 BB_{202}	—	January 29, 2009	Mount Lemmon	Mount Lemmon Survey	·	560 m	MPC · JPL
814888	2009 BR_{202}	—	January 25, 2009	Kitt Peak	Spacewatch	·	1.7 km	MPC · JPL
814889	2009 BB_{203}	—	January 17, 2009	Mount Lemmon	Mount Lemmon Survey	PHO	610 m	MPC · JPL
814890	2009 BJ_{205}	—	January 25, 2009	Kitt Peak	Spacewatch	·	1.5 km	MPC · JPL
814891	2009 BN_{206}	—	January 25, 2009	Kitt Peak	Spacewatch	·	810 m	MPC · JPL
814892	2009 BE_{207}	—	January 17, 2009	Kitt Peak	Spacewatch	HYG	1.8 km	MPC · JPL
814893	2009 BY_{212}	—	January 29, 2009	Kitt Peak	Spacewatch	·	1.7 km	MPC · JPL
814894	2009 BY_{213}	—	January 20, 2009	Kitt Peak	Spacewatch	KOR	830 m	MPC · JPL
814895	2009 BG_{214}	—	January 20, 2009	Kitt Peak	Spacewatch	·	860 m	MPC · JPL
814896	2009 CL	—	February 1, 2009	Socorro	LINEAR	BAR	980 m	MPC · JPL
814897	2009 CN_{14}	—	February 1, 2009	Kitt Peak	Spacewatch	·	1.3 km	MPC · JPL
814898	2009 CE_{16}	—	February 1, 2009	Mount Lemmon	Mount Lemmon Survey	·	1.7 km	MPC · JPL
814899	2009 CP_{16}	—	February 1, 2009	Mount Lemmon	Mount Lemmon Survey	·	500 m	MPC · JPL
814900	2009 CX_{16}	—	January 20, 2009	Mount Lemmon	Mount Lemmon Survey	·	470 m	MPC · JPL

== 814901–815000 ==
back to top

Designation			Discovery			Properties		Ref
Permanent	Provisional	Named after	Date	Site	Discoverer(s)	Category	Diam.	Ref
814901	2009 CC_{22}	—	February 1, 2009	Kitt Peak	Spacewatch	·	460 m	MPC · JPL
814902	2009 CG_{24}	—	February 1, 2009	Kitt Peak	Spacewatch	TRE	1.5 km	MPC · JPL
814903	2009 CT_{36}	—	January 3, 2009	Mount Lemmon	Mount Lemmon Survey	·	1.1 km	MPC · JPL
814904	2009 CC_{43}	—	March 4, 2006	Kitt Peak	Spacewatch	·	390 m	MPC · JPL
814905	2009 CP_{45}	—	January 25, 2006	Kitt Peak	Spacewatch	·	690 m	MPC · JPL
814906	2009 CE_{67}	—	February 4, 2009	Mount Lemmon	Mount Lemmon Survey	(18466)	1.7 km	MPC · JPL
814907	2009 CE_{69}	—	February 1, 2009	Kitt Peak	Spacewatch	PHO	650 m	MPC · JPL
814908	2009 CS_{69}	—	March 25, 2014	Mount Lemmon	Mount Lemmon Survey	·	1.6 km	MPC · JPL
814909	2009 CN_{72}	—	February 1, 2009	Kitt Peak	Spacewatch	·	440 m	MPC · JPL
814910	2009 CU_{72}	—	February 20, 2015	Haleakala	Pan-STARRS 1	URS	2.1 km	MPC · JPL
814911	2009 CE_{73}	—	February 5, 2009	Kitt Peak	Spacewatch	·	600 m	MPC · JPL
814912	2009 CV_{73}	—	December 18, 2015	Mount Lemmon	Mount Lemmon Survey	·	770 m	MPC · JPL
814913	2009 CP_{75}	—	February 1, 2009	Mount Lemmon	Mount Lemmon Survey	NYS	860 m	MPC · JPL
814914	2009 CK_{77}	—	February 2, 2009	Mount Lemmon	Mount Lemmon Survey	JUN	810 m	MPC · JPL
814915	2009 DG_{8}	—	February 19, 2009	Mount Lemmon	Mount Lemmon Survey	·	490 m	MPC · JPL
814916	2009 DJ_{8}	—	February 19, 2009	Mount Lemmon	Mount Lemmon Survey	·	560 m	MPC · JPL
814917	2009 DY_{16}	—	January 18, 2009	Kitt Peak	Spacewatch	·	730 m	MPC · JPL
814918	2009 DM_{26}	—	January 3, 2009	Mount Lemmon	Mount Lemmon Survey	THB	2.4 km	MPC · JPL
814919	2009 DA_{27}	—	January 31, 2009	Kitt Peak	Spacewatch	·	1.2 km	MPC · JPL
814920	2009 DS_{28}	—	September 13, 2007	Mount Lemmon	Mount Lemmon Survey	·	1.3 km	MPC · JPL
814921	2009 DS_{37}	—	February 22, 2009	Mount Lemmon	Mount Lemmon Survey	·	1.2 km	MPC · JPL
814922	2009 DV_{37}	—	February 23, 2009	Calar Alto	F. Hormuth	·	520 m	MPC · JPL
814923	2009 DJ_{47}	—	February 26, 2009	Rehoboth	L. A. Molnar	·	720 m	MPC · JPL
814924	2009 DB_{59}	—	February 22, 2009	Kitt Peak	Spacewatch	·	1.4 km	MPC · JPL
814925	2009 DE_{74}	—	February 26, 2009	Catalina	CSS	H	410 m	MPC · JPL
814926	2009 DM_{85}	—	February 27, 2009	Kitt Peak	Spacewatch	·	870 m	MPC · JPL
814927	2009 DD_{99}	—	February 26, 2009	Kitt Peak	Spacewatch	·	660 m	MPC · JPL
814928	2009 DR_{112}	—	February 26, 2009	Mount Lemmon	Mount Lemmon Survey	·	960 m	MPC · JPL
814929	2009 DX_{113}	—	February 19, 2009	Kitt Peak	Spacewatch	·	1.3 km	MPC · JPL
814930	2009 DY_{124}	—	February 19, 2009	Kitt Peak	Spacewatch	·	1.1 km	MPC · JPL
814931	2009 DF_{130}	—	February 27, 2009	Kitt Peak	Spacewatch	·	1.5 km	MPC · JPL
814932	2009 DR_{131}	—	January 20, 2009	Kitt Peak	Spacewatch	·	440 m	MPC · JPL
814933	2009 DF_{138}	—	February 20, 2009	Kitt Peak	Spacewatch	·	1.4 km	MPC · JPL
814934	2009 DT_{148}	—	February 20, 2009	Mount Lemmon	Mount Lemmon Survey	H	410 m	MPC · JPL
814935	2009 DV_{148}	—	February 1, 2009	Kitt Peak	Spacewatch	H	340 m	MPC · JPL
814936	2009 DO_{149}	—	February 20, 2009	Kitt Peak	Spacewatch	·	510 m	MPC · JPL
814937	2009 DG_{153}	—	February 19, 2009	Kitt Peak	Spacewatch	·	1.3 km	MPC · JPL
814938	2009 DM_{154}	—	February 28, 2009	Kitt Peak	Spacewatch	·	1.1 km	MPC · JPL
814939	2009 DU_{156}	—	February 19, 2009	Kitt Peak	Spacewatch	·	1.3 km	MPC · JPL
814940	2009 DJ_{158}	—	February 20, 2009	Kitt Peak	Spacewatch	·	420 m	MPC · JPL
814941	2009 DK_{160}	—	February 20, 2009	Kitt Peak	Spacewatch	·	1.4 km	MPC · JPL
814942	2009 EO_{15}	—	February 3, 2009	Kitt Peak	Spacewatch	(5)	820 m	MPC · JPL
814943	2009 ED_{23}	—	March 3, 2009	Kitt Peak	Spacewatch	·	730 m	MPC · JPL
814944	2009 EP_{24}	—	March 2, 2009	Kitt Peak	Spacewatch	·	1.1 km	MPC · JPL
814945	2009 EV_{32}	—	March 3, 2009	Mount Lemmon	Mount Lemmon Survey	·	460 m	MPC · JPL
814946	2009 EZ_{34}	—	March 2, 2009	Kitt Peak	Spacewatch	·	780 m	MPC · JPL
814947	2009 EV_{35}	—	October 10, 2015	Haleakala	Pan-STARRS 1	·	1.1 km	MPC · JPL
814948	2009 ER_{37}	—	March 15, 2009	Mount Lemmon	Mount Lemmon Survey	·	1.2 km	MPC · JPL
814949	2009 EY_{37}	—	September 25, 2016	Mount Lemmon	Mount Lemmon Survey	KOR	1.1 km	MPC · JPL
814950	2009 ED_{38}	—	October 8, 2012	Haleakala	Pan-STARRS 1	·	2.2 km	MPC · JPL
814951	2009 FM_{1}	—	March 18, 2009	Mount Lemmon	Mount Lemmon Survey	·	850 m	MPC · JPL
814952	2009 FT_{6}	—	March 16, 2009	Kitt Peak	Spacewatch	·	450 m	MPC · JPL
814953	2009 FK_{8}	—	January 10, 2003	Palomar	NEAT	·	2.2 km	MPC · JPL
814954	2009 FF_{12}	—	March 3, 2009	Mount Lemmon	Mount Lemmon Survey	·	380 m	MPC · JPL
814955	2009 FS_{16}	—	March 19, 2009	Mount Lemmon	Mount Lemmon Survey	H	350 m	MPC · JPL
814956	2009 FC_{20}	—	February 20, 2009	Mount Lemmon	Mount Lemmon Survey	·	2.3 km	MPC · JPL
814957	2009 FJ_{27}	—	March 21, 2009	Kitt Peak	Spacewatch	·	1.6 km	MPC · JPL
814958	2009 FG_{38}	—	February 14, 2009	Kitt Peak	Spacewatch	·	810 m	MPC · JPL
814959	2009 FP_{51}	—	March 3, 2009	Mount Lemmon	Mount Lemmon Survey	EUN	1.1 km	MPC · JPL
814960	2009 FS_{79}	—	March 22, 2009	Mount Lemmon	Mount Lemmon Survey	·	2.4 km	MPC · JPL
814961	2009 FY_{83}	—	March 13, 2016	Haleakala	Pan-STARRS 1	·	550 m	MPC · JPL
814962	2009 FK_{84}	—	April 2, 2016	Haleakala	Pan-STARRS 1	·	580 m	MPC · JPL
814963	2009 FU_{84}	—	March 26, 2009	Kitt Peak	Spacewatch	H	410 m	MPC · JPL
814964	2009 FE_{85}	—	March 26, 2009	Kitt Peak	Spacewatch	·	2.3 km	MPC · JPL
814965	2009 FZ_{88}	—	August 20, 2014	Haleakala	Pan-STARRS 1	·	690 m	MPC · JPL
814966	2009 FT_{89}	—	March 24, 2015	Mount Lemmon	Mount Lemmon Survey	·	2.3 km	MPC · JPL
814967	2009 FD_{93}	—	March 21, 2009	Catalina	CSS	EUN	950 m	MPC · JPL
814968	2009 FK_{94}	—	March 26, 2009	Mount Lemmon	Mount Lemmon Survey	·	580 m	MPC · JPL
814969	2009 FR_{95}	—	March 31, 2009	Mount Lemmon	Mount Lemmon Survey	·	660 m	MPC · JPL
814970	2009 GO_{4}	—	April 3, 2009	Cerro Burek	I. de la Cueva	·	1.6 km	MPC · JPL
814971	2009 GO_{7}	—	March 28, 2009	Kitt Peak	Spacewatch	H	400 m	MPC · JPL
814972	2009 GJ_{8}	—	October 10, 2015	Haleakala	Pan-STARRS 1	·	1.4 km	MPC · JPL
814973	2009 GM_{9}	—	April 2, 2009	Mount Lemmon	Mount Lemmon Survey	V	480 m	MPC · JPL
814974	2009 GE_{10}	—	April 1, 2009	Mount Lemmon	Mount Lemmon Survey	·	1.3 km	MPC · JPL
814975	2009 GW_{10}	—	April 1, 2009	Mount Lemmon	Mount Lemmon Survey	·	460 m	MPC · JPL
814976	2009 HK_{1}	—	March 17, 2009	Kitt Peak	Spacewatch	NYS	820 m	MPC · JPL
814977	2009 HA_{5}	—	April 2, 2009	Mount Lemmon	Mount Lemmon Survey	·	480 m	MPC · JPL
814978	2009 HA_{6}	—	April 17, 2009	Kitt Peak	Spacewatch	·	2.1 km	MPC · JPL
814979	2009 HH_{9}	—	April 17, 2009	Mount Lemmon	Mount Lemmon Survey	·	1.6 km	MPC · JPL
814980	2009 HH_{13}	—	April 17, 2009	Mount Lemmon	Mount Lemmon Survey	H	390 m	MPC · JPL
814981	2009 HK_{28}	—	April 18, 2009	Kitt Peak	Spacewatch	·	1.3 km	MPC · JPL
814982	2009 HM_{36}	—	April 19, 2009	Piszkéstető	K. Sárneczky	EUN	1.0 km	MPC · JPL
814983	2009 HM_{43}	—	March 18, 2009	Kitt Peak	Spacewatch	·	760 m	MPC · JPL
814984	2009 HJ_{55}	—	April 21, 2009	Mount Lemmon	Mount Lemmon Survey	·	480 m	MPC · JPL
814985	2009 HU_{59}	—	April 3, 2009	Catalina	CSS	·	1.9 km	MPC · JPL
814986	2009 HW_{59}	—	April 21, 2009	Mount Lemmon	Mount Lemmon Survey	·	1.4 km	MPC · JPL
814987	2009 HN_{61}	—	April 20, 2009	Mount Lemmon	Mount Lemmon Survey	·	1.5 km	MPC · JPL
814988	2009 HW_{61}	—	April 20, 2009	Mount Lemmon	Mount Lemmon Survey	·	440 m	MPC · JPL
814989	2009 HV_{64}	—	February 24, 2009	Mount Lemmon	Mount Lemmon Survey	H	430 m	MPC · JPL
814990	2009 HV_{69}	—	February 13, 2008	Mount Lemmon	Mount Lemmon Survey	3:2	3.7 km	MPC · JPL
814991	2009 HR_{70}	—	April 22, 2009	Mount Lemmon	Mount Lemmon Survey	·	450 m	MPC · JPL
814992	2009 HT_{70}	—	April 22, 2009	Mount Lemmon	Mount Lemmon Survey	·	1.5 km	MPC · JPL
814993	2009 HB_{72}	—	April 26, 2009	Mount Lemmon	Mount Lemmon Survey	NYS	680 m	MPC · JPL
814994	2009 HZ_{74}	—	April 18, 2009	Kitt Peak	Spacewatch	·	450 m	MPC · JPL
814995	2009 HO_{75}	—	March 21, 2009	Kitt Peak	Spacewatch	H	410 m	MPC · JPL
814996	2009 HV_{82}	—	February 27, 2009	Mount Lemmon	Mount Lemmon Survey	·	610 m	MPC · JPL
814997	2009 HT_{87}	—	April 30, 2009	Mount Lemmon	Mount Lemmon Survey	·	620 m	MPC · JPL
814998	2009 HC_{102}	—	April 20, 2009	Kitt Peak	Spacewatch	·	700 m	MPC · JPL
814999	2009 HK_{113}	—	April 18, 2009	Mount Lemmon	Mount Lemmon Survey	·	730 m	MPC · JPL
815000	2009 HP_{114}	—	October 14, 2010	Mount Lemmon	Mount Lemmon Survey	H	420 m	MPC · JPL

back to top

== Meaning of names ==
As minor planet discoveries are confirmed, they are given a permanent number by the IAU's Minor Planet Center (MPC), and the discoverers can then submit names for them, following the IAU's naming conventions. The list below concerns those minor planets in the specified number-range that have received names, and explains the meanings of those names.

Official naming citations of newly named small Solar System bodies are approved and published in a bulletin by IAU's Working Group for Small Bodies Nomenclature (WGSBN). Before May 2021, citations were published in MPC's Minor Planet Circulars for many decades. Recent citations can also be found on the JPL Small-Body Database (SBDB). Until his death in 2016, German astronomer Lutz D. Schmadel compiled these citations into the Dictionary of Minor Planet Names (DMP) and regularly updated the collection.

Based on Paul Herget's The Names of the Minor Planets, Schmadel also researched the unclear origin of numerous asteroids, most of which had been named prior to World War II. This article incorporates text from this source, which is in the public domain: SBDB New namings may only be added to this list below after official publication as the preannouncement of names is condemned. The WGSBN publishes a comprehensive guideline for the naming rules of non-cometary small Solar System bodies.

Named minor planet	Provisional	This minor planet was named for...	Ref · Catalog
814147 Vladturcu	2008 EB_{145}	Description available (see ref). Please summarize in your own words.	IAU · 814147
814148 Alexandrupop	2008 EW_{154}	Description available (see ref). Please summarize in your own words.	IAU · 814148
