= List of minor planets: 886001–887000 =

The following is a partial list of minor planets, running from minor-planet number 886001 through 887000, inclusive. The primary data for this and other partial lists is based on JPL's "Small-Body Orbital Elements" and data available from the Minor Planet Center. Critical list information is also provided by the MPC, unless otherwise specified from Lowell Observatory. A detailed description of the table's columns and additional sources are given on the main page including a complete list of every page in this series, and a statistical break-up on the dynamical classification of minor planets.

Also see the summary list of all named bodies in numerical and alphabetical order, and the corresponding naming citations for the number range of this particular list. New namings may only be added to this list after official publication, as the preannouncement of names is condemned by the Working Group for Small Bodies Nomenclature of the International Astronomical Union.

Near-Earth obj.	MBA (inner)	MBA (outer)	Centaur
Mars-crosser	MBA (middle)	Jupiter trojan	Trans-Neptunian obj.
Unclassified

== 886001–886100 ==
Designation			Discovery			Properties		Ref
Permanent	Provisional	Named after	Date	Site	Discoverer(s)	Category	Diam.	Ref
886001	2019 TM_{16}	—	October 2, 2008	Kitt Peak	Spacewatch	·	1.6 km	MPC · JPL
886002	2019 TV_{16}	—	October 7, 2019	Haleakala	Pan-STARRS 1	H	340 m	MPC · JPL
886003	2019 TK_{19}	—	September 2, 2013	Mount Lemmon	Mount Lemmon Survey	·	2.1 km	MPC · JPL
886004	2019 TT_{19}	—	September 6, 2008	Mount Lemmon	Mount Lemmon Survey	·	1.8 km	MPC · JPL
886005	2019 TP_{20}	—	September 23, 2008	Kitt Peak	Spacewatch	·	1.6 km	MPC · JPL
886006	2019 TB_{22}	—	April 1, 2016	Mount Lemmon	Mount Lemmon Survey	·	2.1 km	MPC · JPL
886007	2019 TO_{23}	—	October 21, 2014	Kitt Peak	Spacewatch	·	1.2 km	MPC · JPL
886008	2019 TO_{24}	—	October 8, 2019	Haleakala	Pan-STARRS 1	EUN	810 m	MPC · JPL
886009	2019 TT_{25}	—	October 8, 2019	Mount Lemmon	Mount Lemmon Survey	·	1.9 km	MPC · JPL
886010	2019 TJ_{27}	—	April 13, 2018	Haleakala	Pan-STARRS 1	·	1.2 km	MPC · JPL
886011	2019 TA_{30}	—	September 24, 2019	Haleakala	Pan-STARRS 1	·	920 m	MPC · JPL
886012	2019 TD_{30}	—	December 10, 2014	Mount Lemmon	Mount Lemmon Survey	·	1.7 km	MPC · JPL
886013	2019 TY_{32}	—	October 5, 2019	Haleakala	Pan-STARRS 1	·	1.8 km	MPC · JPL
886014	2019 TZ_{35}	—	October 11, 2019	Mount Lemmon	Mount Lemmon Survey	·	840 m	MPC · JPL
886015	2019 TV_{36}	—	October 1, 2019	Haleakala	Pan-STARRS 1	T_{j} (2.96)	2.6 km	MPC · JPL
886016	2019 TR_{37}	—	October 5, 2019	Haleakala	Pan-STARRS 2	·	1.3 km	MPC · JPL
886017	2019 TU_{37}	—	October 3, 2019	Mount Lemmon	Mount Lemmon Survey	·	2.6 km	MPC · JPL
886018	2019 TC_{38}	—	October 5, 2019	Haleakala	Pan-STARRS 1	·	2.2 km	MPC · JPL
886019	2019 TS_{44}	—	October 5, 2019	Haleakala	Pan-STARRS 1	·	1.9 km	MPC · JPL
886020	2019 TN_{46}	—	October 9, 2019	Mount Lemmon	Mount Lemmon Survey	·	1.9 km	MPC · JPL
886021	2019 TT_{46}	—	October 10, 2019	Mount Lemmon	Mount Lemmon Survey	T_{j} (2.92)	3.3 km	MPC · JPL
886022	2019 TQ_{47}	—	October 9, 2019	Haleakala	Pan-STARRS 1	·	1.4 km	MPC · JPL
886023	2019 TQ_{49}	—	August 11, 2013	Kitt Peak	Spacewatch	·	2.0 km	MPC · JPL
886024	2019 TY_{52}	—	March 20, 2017	Haleakala	Pan-STARRS 1	EOS	1.6 km	MPC · JPL
886025	2019 TB_{57}	—	October 11, 2019	Mount Lemmon	Mount Lemmon Survey	LIX	2.9 km	MPC · JPL
886026	2019 TW_{59}	—	October 3, 2019	Mount Lemmon	Mount Lemmon Survey	·	1.6 km	MPC · JPL
886027	2019 TE_{60}	—	October 8, 2019	Mount Lemmon	Mount Lemmon Survey	·	1.6 km	MPC · JPL
886028	2019 TL_{62}	—	October 7, 2019	Haleakala	Pan-STARRS 1	·	2.6 km	MPC · JPL
886029	2019 TO_{63}	—	October 8, 2019	Mount Lemmon	Mount Lemmon Survey	·	790 m	MPC · JPL
886030	2019 TT_{63}	—	October 8, 2019	Mount Lemmon	Mount Lemmon Survey	·	2.1 km	MPC · JPL
886031	2019 TF_{65}	—	October 8, 2019	Haleakala	Pan-STARRS 1	·	1.3 km	MPC · JPL
886032	2019 TE_{67}	—	October 5, 2019	Haleakala	Pan-STARRS 1	·	1.9 km	MPC · JPL
886033	2019 TZ_{78}	—	October 7, 2019	Mount Lemmon	Mount Lemmon Survey	·	1.4 km	MPC · JPL
886034	2019 TG_{80}	—	October 8, 2019	Mount Lemmon	Mount Lemmon Survey	·	1.9 km	MPC · JPL
886035	2019 TY_{84}	—	October 7, 2019	Haleakala	Pan-STARRS 1	·	2.4 km	MPC · JPL
886036	2019 TM_{85}	—	October 5, 2019	Haleakala	Pan-STARRS 1	EUN	660 m	MPC · JPL
886037	2019 TX_{103}	—	October 3, 2019	Mount Lemmon	Mount Lemmon Survey	·	1.9 km	MPC · JPL
886038	2019 UY_{12}	—	October 12, 2015	Haleakala	Pan-STARRS 1	·	240 m	MPC · JPL
886039	2019 UJ_{13}	—	October 28, 2019	Haleakala	Pan-STARRS 1	T_{j} (2.89) · AMO	390 m	MPC · JPL
886040	2019 UY_{15}	—	November 21, 2014	Haleakala	Pan-STARRS 1	VER	2.1 km	MPC · JPL
886041	2019 UZ_{15}	—	December 20, 2009	Mount Lemmon	Mount Lemmon Survey	·	1.6 km	MPC · JPL
886042	2019 UH_{16}	—	October 9, 2019	Mount Lemmon	Mount Lemmon Survey	·	2.3 km	MPC · JPL
886043	2019 UO_{16}	—	December 29, 2014	Mount Lemmon	Mount Lemmon Survey	·	1.8 km	MPC · JPL
886044	2019 UJ_{17}	—	October 23, 2019	Mount Lemmon	Mount Lemmon Survey	·	2.5 km	MPC · JPL
886045	2019 UL_{17}	—	October 24, 2019	Mount Lemmon	Mount Lemmon Survey	LUT	2.8 km	MPC · JPL
886046	2019 UR_{17}	—	October 24, 2013	Mount Lemmon	Mount Lemmon Survey	·	2.1 km	MPC · JPL
886047	2019 UJ_{18}	—	October 22, 2019	Mount Lemmon	Mount Lemmon Survey	·	1.6 km	MPC · JPL
886048	2019 UL_{19}	—	October 22, 2019	Mount Lemmon	Mount Lemmon Survey	TIR	2.3 km	MPC · JPL
886049	2019 US_{21}	—	October 21, 2019	Mount Lemmon	Mount Lemmon Survey	·	2.6 km	MPC · JPL
886050	2019 UA_{22}	—	September 14, 2013	Haleakala	Pan-STARRS 1	·	2.0 km	MPC · JPL
886051	2019 UC_{24}	—	June 16, 2018	Haleakala	Pan-STARRS 1	·	2.2 km	MPC · JPL
886052	2019 UO_{24}	—	December 10, 2014	Mount Lemmon	Mount Lemmon Survey	·	1.7 km	MPC · JPL
886053	2019 UX_{24}	—	October 24, 2019	Mount Lemmon	Mount Lemmon Survey	·	1.6 km	MPC · JPL
886054	2019 UA_{26}	—	October 28, 2008	Kitt Peak	Spacewatch	·	1.8 km	MPC · JPL
886055	2019 UZ_{26}	—	October 8, 2008	Kitt Peak	Spacewatch	·	1.9 km	MPC · JPL
886056	2019 UL_{28}	—	December 28, 2014	Mount Lemmon	Mount Lemmon Survey	·	1.9 km	MPC · JPL
886057	2019 UP_{28}	—	October 28, 2019	Haleakala	Pan-STARRS 1	·	2.0 km	MPC · JPL
886058	2019 UN_{36}	—	March 28, 2016	Cerro Tololo	DECam	EOS	1.1 km	MPC · JPL
886059	2019 UH_{37}	—	October 24, 2019	Mount Lemmon	Mount Lemmon Survey	·	1.7 km	MPC · JPL
886060	2019 UJ_{37}	—	October 8, 2008	Mount Lemmon	Mount Lemmon Survey	EOS	1.2 km	MPC · JPL
886061	2019 UL_{37}	—	October 26, 2019	Mount Lemmon	Mount Lemmon Survey	EOS	1.4 km	MPC · JPL
886062	2019 UQ_{37}	—	March 29, 2016	Cerro Tololo	DECam	·	1.6 km	MPC · JPL
886063	2019 UV_{37}	—	March 28, 2016	Cerro Tololo	DECam	·	1.3 km	MPC · JPL
886064	2019 UC_{41}	—	January 11, 2016	Haleakala	Pan-STARRS 1	·	1.9 km	MPC · JPL
886065	2019 UL_{43}	—	October 24, 2019	Haleakala	Pan-STARRS 1	(69559)	1.9 km	MPC · JPL
886066	2019 UM_{48}	—	October 31, 2019	Mount Lemmon	Mount Lemmon Survey	T_{j} (2.98)	2.6 km	MPC · JPL
886067	2019 UF_{49}	—	October 21, 2019	Mount Lemmon	Mount Lemmon Survey	·	2.7 km	MPC · JPL
886068	2019 UT_{52}	—	October 24, 2019	Haleakala	Pan-STARRS 1	·	2.0 km	MPC · JPL
886069	2019 UW_{52}	—	October 24, 2019	Haleakala	Pan-STARRS 1	·	1.8 km	MPC · JPL
886070	2019 UA_{53}	—	October 24, 2019	Haleakala	Pan-STARRS 1	·	1.9 km	MPC · JPL
886071	2019 UD_{55}	—	October 28, 2019	Haleakala	Pan-STARRS 1	·	1.6 km	MPC · JPL
886072	2019 US_{55}	—	December 27, 2014	Haleakala	Pan-STARRS 1	·	2.2 km	MPC · JPL
886073	2019 UW_{55}	—	December 26, 2014	Haleakala	Pan-STARRS 1	·	2.2 km	MPC · JPL
886074	2019 UM_{56}	—	March 16, 2016	Haleakala	Pan-STARRS 1	·	2.2 km	MPC · JPL
886075	2019 UC_{78}	—	October 23, 2019	Mount Lemmon	Mount Lemmon Survey	·	1.9 km	MPC · JPL
886076	2019 UN_{78}	—	March 30, 2016	Cerro Tololo	DECam	·	1.3 km	MPC · JPL
886077	2019 US_{78}	—	October 21, 2019	Mount Lemmon	Mount Lemmon Survey	critical	890 m	MPC · JPL
886078	2019 UM_{80}	—	October 23, 2019	Mount Lemmon	Mount Lemmon Survey	·	2.0 km	MPC · JPL
886079	2019 UM_{84}	—	October 30, 2019	Mount Lemmon	Mount Lemmon Survey	T_{j} (2.99)	2.3 km	MPC · JPL
886080	2019 UY_{84}	—	October 27, 2019	Haleakala	Pan-STARRS 2	TIR	1.7 km	MPC · JPL
886081	2019 UU_{97}	—	March 13, 2016	Haleakala	Pan-STARRS 1	·	1.3 km	MPC · JPL
886082	2019 UP_{100}	—	May 10, 2016	Mount Lemmon	Mount Lemmon Survey	·	2.2 km	MPC · JPL
886083	2019 UT_{100}	—	October 26, 2019	Haleakala	Pan-STARRS 1	THB	1.9 km	MPC · JPL
886084	2019 UY_{100}	—	October 22, 2019	Mount Lemmon	Mount Lemmon Survey	URS	2.0 km	MPC · JPL
886085	2019 UT_{112}	—	March 12, 2016	Haleakala	Pan-STARRS 1	·	2.1 km	MPC · JPL
886086	2019 UO_{115}	—	November 21, 2014	Haleakala	Pan-STARRS 1	·	2.1 km	MPC · JPL
886087	2019 UA_{116}	—	October 25, 2019	Haleakala	Pan-STARRS 2	·	2.4 km	MPC · JPL
886088	2019 UE_{118}	—	October 28, 2019	Haleakala	Pan-STARRS 1	·	1.4 km	MPC · JPL
886089	2019 UE_{120}	—	October 22, 2019	Mount Lemmon	Mount Lemmon Survey	·	830 m	MPC · JPL
886090	2019 UK_{126}	—	October 23, 2019	Haleakala	Pan-STARRS 1	·	1.1 km	MPC · JPL
886091	2019 UR_{132}	—	January 17, 2016	Haleakala	Pan-STARRS 1	VER	2.0 km	MPC · JPL
886092	2019 UO_{135}	—	June 12, 2018	Haleakala	Pan-STARRS 1	TIR	1.7 km	MPC · JPL
886093	2019 UM_{143}	—	October 24, 2019	Haleakala	Pan-STARRS 1	·	2.1 km	MPC · JPL
886094	2019 UG_{150}	—	October 26, 2019	Mount Lemmon	Mount Lemmon Survey	EUP	2.3 km	MPC · JPL
886095	2019 UO_{167}	—	October 24, 2019	Haleakala	Pan-STARRS 1	·	1.1 km	MPC · JPL
886096	2019 UO_{177}	—	October 28, 2019	Haleakala	Pan-STARRS 1	·	1.9 km	MPC · JPL
886097	2019 VO_{1}	—	November 2, 2019	Haleakala	Pan-STARRS 1	APO · PHA	140 m	MPC · JPL
886098	2019 VU_{1}	—	October 21, 2019	Mount Lemmon	Mount Lemmon Survey	·	660 m	MPC · JPL
886099	2019 VY_{5}	—	November 4, 2019	WISE	WISE	·	480 m	MPC · JPL
886100	2019 VV_{6}	—	January 3, 2016	Haleakala	Pan-STARRS 1	·	1.2 km	MPC · JPL

== 886101–886200 ==
back to top

Designation			Discovery			Properties		Ref
Permanent	Provisional	Named after	Date	Site	Discoverer(s)	Category	Diam.	Ref
886101	2019 VE_{9}	—	November 1, 2019	Mount Lemmon	Mount Lemmon Survey	·	2.2 km	MPC · JPL
886102	2019 VL_{9}	—	November 5, 2019	Haleakala	Pan-STARRS 2	URS	2.2 km	MPC · JPL
886103	2019 VY_{9}	—	November 2, 2019	Haleakala	Pan-STARRS 1	·	1.9 km	MPC · JPL
886104	2019 VR_{10}	—	March 29, 2016	Cerro Tololo	DECam	·	2.3 km	MPC · JPL
886105	2019 VX_{10}	—	April 3, 2016	Haleakala	Pan-STARRS 1	EOS	1.5 km	MPC · JPL
886106	2019 VN_{11}	—	November 2, 2019	Haleakala	Pan-STARRS 2	·	1.8 km	MPC · JPL
886107	2019 VX_{12}	—	November 5, 2019	Haleakala	Pan-STARRS 2	·	1.8 km	MPC · JPL
886108	2019 VE_{13}	—	November 8, 2019	Mount Lemmon	Mount Lemmon Survey	·	820 m	MPC · JPL
886109	2019 VS_{15}	—	November 5, 2019	Mount Lemmon	Mount Lemmon Survey	·	2.2 km	MPC · JPL
886110	2019 VE_{18}	—	November 4, 2019	Mount Lemmon	Mount Lemmon Survey	·	1.6 km	MPC · JPL
886111	2019 VJ_{20}	—	November 2, 2019	Haleakala	Pan-STARRS 2	·	2.1 km	MPC · JPL
886112	2019 VQ_{21}	—	November 5, 2019	Mount Lemmon	Mount Lemmon Survey	·	2.1 km	MPC · JPL
886113	2019 VT_{21}	—	November 5, 2019	Mount Lemmon	Mount Lemmon Survey	·	1.7 km	MPC · JPL
886114	2019 VA_{22}	—	March 29, 2016	Cerro Tololo	DECam	EOS	1.1 km	MPC · JPL
886115	2019 VK_{25}	—	November 4, 2019	Mount Lemmon	Mount Lemmon Survey	·	1.7 km	MPC · JPL
886116	2019 VL_{29}	—	December 20, 2014	Haleakala	Pan-STARRS 1	·	1.2 km	MPC · JPL
886117	2019 VC_{39}	—	November 2, 2019	Mount Lemmon	Mount Lemmon Survey	EUP	2.9 km	MPC · JPL
886118	2019 VK_{46}	—	November 5, 2019	Mount Lemmon	Mount Lemmon Survey	·	1.4 km	MPC · JPL
886119	2019 VG_{51}	—	November 5, 2019	Haleakala	Pan-STARRS 2	·	2.4 km	MPC · JPL
886120	2019 VF_{57}	—	November 4, 2019	Mount Lemmon	Mount Lemmon Survey	·	2.0 km	MPC · JPL
886121	2019 WK_{3}	—	June 15, 2015	Haleakala	Pan-STARRS 1	·	630 m	MPC · JPL
886122	2019 WH_{8}	—	November 24, 2019	Mount Lemmon	Mount Lemmon Survey	·	2.3 km	MPC · JPL
886123	2019 WR_{8}	—	November 18, 2019	Mount Lemmon	Mount Lemmon Survey	·	2.4 km	MPC · JPL
886124	2019 WW_{8}	—	November 24, 2019	Mount Lemmon	Mount Lemmon Survey	critical	1.5 km	MPC · JPL
886125	2019 WY_{10}	—	November 27, 2013	Catalina	CSS	·	1.8 km	MPC · JPL
886126	2019 WA_{16}	—	November 27, 2019	Haleakala	Pan-STARRS 2	EUP	2.3 km	MPC · JPL
886127	2019 WB_{16}	—	November 26, 2019	Haleakala	Pan-STARRS 1	·	1.8 km	MPC · JPL
886128	2019 WB_{21}	—	March 28, 2016	Cerro Tololo	DECam	·	1.7 km	MPC · JPL
886129	2019 WU_{22}	—	November 28, 2019	Haleakala	Pan-STARRS 2	·	590 m	MPC · JPL
886130	2019 WS_{24}	—	November 24, 2019	Mount Lemmon	Mount Lemmon Survey	critical	880 m	MPC · JPL
886131	2019 WR_{38}	—	February 10, 2016	Haleakala	Pan-STARRS 1	·	1.6 km	MPC · JPL
886132	2019 XR_{2}	—	October 29, 2002	Kitt Peak	Spacewatch	·	1.4 km	MPC · JPL
886133	2019 XP_{6}	—	December 3, 2019	Haleakala	Pan-STARRS 2	·	1.8 km	MPC · JPL
886134	2019 XQ_{10}	—	December 4, 2019	Haleakala	Pan-STARRS 1	·	720 m	MPC · JPL
886135	2019 XB_{13}	—	October 15, 2013	Mount Lemmon	Mount Lemmon Survey	LIX	2.6 km	MPC · JPL
886136	2019 XO_{18}	—	January 8, 2016	Mount Teide	E. Schwab	JUN	570 m	MPC · JPL
886137	2019 XV_{20}	—	December 6, 2019	Mount Lemmon	Mount Lemmon Survey	·	2.2 km	MPC · JPL
886138	2019 YR_{4}	—	December 30, 2019	Haleakala	Pan-STARRS 2	APO	680 m	MPC · JPL
886139	2019 YY_{5}	—	December 30, 2019	Haleakala	Pan-STARRS 1	APO	240 m	MPC · JPL
886140	2019 YK_{9}	—	December 28, 2019	Haleakala	Pan-STARRS 1	·	2.4 km	MPC · JPL
886141	2019 YG_{10}	—	December 21, 2019	Mount Lemmon	Mount Lemmon Survey	·	870 m	MPC · JPL
886142	2019 YH_{11}	—	December 19, 2019	Haleakala	Pan-STARRS 1	·	820 m	MPC · JPL
886143	2019 YE_{12}	—	December 24, 2019	Haleakala	Pan-STARRS 1	·	1.1 km	MPC · JPL
886144	2019 YV_{17}	—	December 28, 2019	Haleakala	Pan-STARRS 1	critical	820 m	MPC · JPL
886145	2019 YG_{18}	—	December 28, 2019	Haleakala	Pan-STARRS 1	ADE	1.2 km	MPC · JPL
886146	2019 YR_{19}	—	December 30, 2019	Haleakala	Pan-STARRS 1	T_{j} (2.96)	2.7 km	MPC · JPL
886147	2019 YE_{24}	—	December 20, 2019	Mount Lemmon	Mount Lemmon Survey	·	2.2 km	MPC · JPL
886148	2019 YW_{29}	—	March 12, 2016	Haleakala	Pan-STARRS 1	·	1.1 km	MPC · JPL
886149	2019 YS_{33}	—	March 13, 2013	Haleakala	Pan-STARRS 1	3:2	4.2 km	MPC · JPL
886150	2019 YW_{35}	—	January 15, 2015	Haleakala	Pan-STARRS 1	VER	2.0 km	MPC · JPL
886151	2019 YZ_{35}	—	March 16, 2015	Mount Lemmon	Mount Lemmon Survey	·	2.1 km	MPC · JPL
886152	2019 YC_{36}	—	December 20, 2019	Mount Lemmon	Mount Lemmon Survey	·	2.4 km	MPC · JPL
886153	2019 YP_{41}	—	December 17, 2019	Mount Lemmon	Mount Lemmon Survey	·	2.4 km	MPC · JPL
886154	2019 YC_{47}	—	December 24, 2019	Haleakala	Pan-STARRS 1	·	2.6 km	MPC · JPL
886155	2019 YG_{49}	—	September 5, 2010	Mount Lemmon	Mount Lemmon Survey	JUN	640 m	MPC · JPL
886156	2019 YV_{52}	—	December 31, 2019	Haleakala	Pan-STARRS 1	·	1.8 km	MPC · JPL
886157	2020 AB_{12}	—	December 28, 2016	Haleakala	Pan-STARRS 1	H	390 m	MPC · JPL
886158	2020 AV_{14}	—	January 28, 2015	Haleakala	Pan-STARRS 1	·	2.6 km	MPC · JPL
886159	2020 AR_{16}	—	January 5, 2020	Mount Lemmon	Mount Lemmon Survey	·	2.6 km	MPC · JPL
886160	2020 AH_{31}	—	January 3, 2020	Mount Lemmon	Mount Lemmon Survey	·	1.1 km	MPC · JPL
886161	2020 BC_{17}	—	March 17, 2016	Haleakala	Pan-STARRS 1	·	1.2 km	MPC · JPL
886162	2020 BQ_{18}	—	January 19, 2020	Haleakala	Pan-STARRS 2	·	1.1 km	MPC · JPL
886163	2020 BQ_{24}	—	October 25, 2014	Mount Lemmon	Mount Lemmon Survey	·	930 m	MPC · JPL
886164	2020 BA_{33}	—	April 1, 2016	Haleakala	Pan-STARRS 1	·	1.1 km	MPC · JPL
886165	2020 BU_{34}	—	January 28, 2020	Mount Lemmon	Mount Lemmon Survey	H	360 m	MPC · JPL
886166	2020 BJ_{39}	—	January 21, 2020	Haleakala	Pan-STARRS 2	·	1.6 km	MPC · JPL
886167	2020 BZ_{40}	—	January 3, 2014	Mount Lemmon	Mount Lemmon Survey	·	1.9 km	MPC · JPL
886168	2020 BJ_{51}	—	January 23, 2020	Mount Lemmon	Mount Lemmon Survey	·	1.3 km	MPC · JPL
886169	2020 BW_{82}	—	March 31, 2016	Mount Lemmon	Mount Lemmon Survey	AST	1.1 km	MPC · JPL
886170	2020 BW_{88}	—	January 21, 2020	Haleakala	Pan-STARRS 1	PHO	720 m	MPC · JPL
886171	2020 BL_{117}	—	February 8, 2011	Mount Lemmon	Mount Lemmon Survey	·	1.5 km	MPC · JPL
886172	2020 BE_{126}	—	January 23, 2020	Haleakala	Pan-STARRS 1	critical	1.3 km	MPC · JPL
886173	2020 BU_{134}	—	January 20, 2020	Haleakala	Pan-STARRS 1	·	2.3 km	MPC · JPL
886174	2020 BD_{135}	—	January 21, 2020	Haleakala	Pan-STARRS 1	·	2.5 km	MPC · JPL
886175	2020 BX_{143}	—	January 25, 2020	Haleakala	Pan-STARRS 2	·	930 m	MPC · JPL
886176	2020 BZ_{149}	—	January 23, 2020	Haleakala	Pan-STARRS 1	PAD	950 m	MPC · JPL
886177	2020 BF_{150}	—	January 25, 2020	Mount Lemmon	Mount Lemmon Survey	·	1.0 km	MPC · JPL
886178	2020 BA_{153}	—	January 19, 2020	Haleakala	Pan-STARRS 1	·	1.5 km	MPC · JPL
886179	2020 BG_{155}	—	January 23, 2020	Haleakala	Pan-STARRS 1	·	740 m	MPC · JPL
886180	2020 CF_{10}	—	February 15, 2020	Mount Lemmon	Mount Lemmon Survey	·	1.6 km	MPC · JPL
886181	2020 EM	—	March 5, 2020	Mauna Loa	ATLAS	APO	380 m	MPC · JPL
886182	2020 FY_{11}	—	March 22, 2020	Haleakala	Pan-STARRS 2	·	1.2 km	MPC · JPL
886183	2020 FG_{12}	—	March 29, 2020	Haleakala	Pan-STARRS 1	L5	7.2 km	MPC · JPL
886184	2020 FZ_{18}	—	March 31, 2009	Mount Lemmon	Mount Lemmon Survey	·	1.7 km	MPC · JPL
886185	2020 FN_{21}	—	March 21, 2020	Haleakala	Pan-STARRS 1	KON	1.7 km	MPC · JPL
886186	2020 FO_{22}	—	March 22, 2020	Haleakala	Pan-STARRS 1	·	820 m	MPC · JPL
886187	2020 FO_{28}	—	June 11, 2015	Haleakala	Pan-STARRS 1	·	1.3 km	MPC · JPL
886188	2020 GL_{4}	—	April 3, 2020	Mount Lemmon	Mount Lemmon Survey	·	680 m	MPC · JPL
886189	2020 GO_{6}	—	April 1, 2014	Kitt Peak	Spacewatch	·	1.8 km	MPC · JPL
886190	2020 GW_{6}	—	June 2, 2016	Mount Lemmon	Mount Lemmon Survey	·	940 m	MPC · JPL
886191	2020 GL_{8}	—	September 18, 2017	Haleakala	Pan-STARRS 1	·	830 m	MPC · JPL
886192	2020 GC_{14}	—	April 15, 2020	Mount Lemmon	Mount Lemmon Survey	·	1.0 km	MPC · JPL
886193	2020 GO_{27}	—	June 24, 2017	Haleakala	Pan-STARRS 1	·	920 m	MPC · JPL
886194	2020 HH_{16}	—	April 28, 2020	Haleakala	Pan-STARRS 1	MAR	590 m	MPC · JPL
886195	2020 HT_{16}	—	April 28, 2020	Haleakala	Pan-STARRS 1	·	870 m	MPC · JPL
886196	2020 HY_{16}	—	August 21, 2015	Haleakala	Pan-STARRS 1	·	1.4 km	MPC · JPL
886197	2020 HC_{22}	—	April 21, 2020	Haleakala	Pan-STARRS 1	TIR	1.7 km	MPC · JPL
886198	2020 HB_{25}	—	August 3, 2016	Haleakala	Pan-STARRS 1	·	820 m	MPC · JPL
886199	2020 HN_{25}	—	April 2, 2019	Haleakala	Pan-STARRS 1	L5	5.7 km	MPC · JPL
886200	2020 HM_{27}	—	April 21, 2020	Haleakala	Pan-STARRS 1	·	460 m	MPC · JPL

== 886201–886300 ==
back to top

Designation			Discovery			Properties		Ref
Permanent	Provisional	Named after	Date	Site	Discoverer(s)	Category	Diam.	Ref
886201	2020 HJ_{28}	—	July 8, 2016	Haleakala	Pan-STARRS 1	·	1.2 km	MPC · JPL
886202	2020 HN_{29}	—	November 24, 2017	Haleakala	Pan-STARRS 1	MAR	850 m	MPC · JPL
886203	2020 HK_{32}	—	October 30, 2017	Haleakala	Pan-STARRS 1	·	1.1 km	MPC · JPL
886204	2020 HH_{33}	—	January 7, 2016	XuYi	PMO NEO Survey Program	L5	7.0 km	MPC · JPL
886205	2020 HZ_{34}	—	April 21, 2020	Haleakala	Pan-STARRS 1	·	770 m	MPC · JPL
886206	2020 HW_{37}	—	April 28, 2020	Haleakala	Pan-STARRS 1	PHO	790 m	MPC · JPL
886207	2020 HF_{42}	—	June 8, 2016	Haleakala	Pan-STARRS 1	·	760 m	MPC · JPL
886208	2020 HX_{42}	—	April 1, 2016	Haleakala	Pan-STARRS 1	·	870 m	MPC · JPL
886209	2020 HL_{45}	—	September 24, 2017	Haleakala	Pan-STARRS 1	·	890 m	MPC · JPL
886210	2020 HN_{45}	—	April 16, 2020	Mount Lemmon	Mount Lemmon Survey	EUN	620 m	MPC · JPL
886211	2020 HK_{48}	—	April 18, 2020	Haleakala	Pan-STARRS 1	·	910 m	MPC · JPL
886212	2020 HE_{51}	—	April 20, 2020	Haleakala	Pan-STARRS 1	L5	5.7 km	MPC · JPL
886213	2020 HX_{52}	—	April 20, 2020	Haleakala	Pan-STARRS 2	·	860 m	MPC · JPL
886214	2020 HZ_{52}	—	May 17, 2016	Haleakala	Pan-STARRS 1	·	830 m	MPC · JPL
886215	2020 HR_{56}	—	April 21, 2020	Haleakala	Pan-STARRS 1	·	1.7 km	MPC · JPL
886216	2020 HM_{57}	—	August 31, 2017	Haleakala	Pan-STARRS 1	·	750 m	MPC · JPL
886217	2020 HT_{57}	—	April 21, 2020	Haleakala	Pan-STARRS 2	·	660 m	MPC · JPL
886218	2020 HW_{60}	—	April 23, 2020	Mount Lemmon	Mount Lemmon Survey	·	1.1 km	MPC · JPL
886219	2020 HD_{61}	—	April 24, 2020	Mount Lemmon	Mount Lemmon Survey	·	660 m	MPC · JPL
886220	2020 HY_{66}	—	April 20, 2020	Haleakala	Pan-STARRS 1	·	860 m	MPC · JPL
886221	2020 HZ_{68}	—	April 19, 2020	Haleakala	Pan-STARRS 1	·	880 m	MPC · JPL
886222	2020 HE_{74}	—	April 16, 2020	Mount Lemmon	Mount Lemmon Survey	BAR	700 m	MPC · JPL
886223	2020 HP_{88}	—	April 21, 2020	Haleakala	Pan-STARRS 2	EOS	1.2 km	MPC · JPL
886224	2020 HN_{92}	—	April 19, 2020	Haleakala	Pan-STARRS 1	·	2.1 km	MPC · JPL
886225	2020 HO_{93}	—	April 22, 2020	Haleakala	Pan-STARRS 1	·	730 m	MPC · JPL
886226	2020 HJ_{97}	—	April 21, 2020	Haleakala	Pan-STARRS 1	L5	6.3 km	MPC · JPL
886227	2020 HP_{104}	—	April 20, 2020	Haleakala	Pan-STARRS 1	·	2.0 km	MPC · JPL
886228	2020 HW_{113}	—	April 20, 2020	Haleakala	Pan-STARRS 1	L5	6.7 km	MPC · JPL
886229	2020 HN_{114}	—	April 20, 2020	Haleakala	Pan-STARRS 1	L5	6.4 km	MPC · JPL
886230	2020 HE_{116}	—	January 14, 2015	Haleakala	Pan-STARRS 1	L5	6.4 km	MPC · JPL
886231	2020 HR_{122}	—	September 30, 2014	Catalina	CSS	V	480 m	MPC · JPL
886232	2020 HJ_{133}	—	April 21, 2020	Haleakala	Pan-STARRS 1	BRG	1.1 km	MPC · JPL
886233	2020 HS_{133}	—	April 20, 2020	Haleakala	Pan-STARRS 1	(5)	770 m	MPC · JPL
886234	2020 HH_{140}	—	September 30, 2017	Haleakala	Pan-STARRS 1	BRA	790 m	MPC · JPL
886235	2020 HT_{155}	—	April 27, 2020	Haleakala	Pan-STARRS 1	L5	5.7 km	MPC · JPL
886236	2020 HR_{179}	—	April 21, 2020	Haleakala	Pan-STARRS 1	L5	5.4 km	MPC · JPL
886237	2020 HR_{180}	—	April 20, 2020	Haleakala	Pan-STARRS 1	L5	5.2 km	MPC · JPL
886238	2020 HS_{205}	—	November 27, 2014	Haleakala	Pan-STARRS 1	L5	7.0 km	MPC · JPL
886239	2020 JK_{4}	—	June 20, 2010	WISE	WISE	LIX	2.7 km	MPC · JPL
886240	2020 JR_{4}	—	June 8, 2016	Haleakala	Pan-STARRS 1	·	790 m	MPC · JPL
886241	2020 JC_{8}	—	May 13, 2020	Mount Lemmon	Mount Lemmon Survey	·	790 m	MPC · JPL
886242	2020 JB_{12}	—	May 13, 2020	Mount Lemmon	Mount Lemmon Survey	·	1.1 km	MPC · JPL
886243	2020 JK_{13}	—	May 3, 2016	Haleakala	Pan-STARRS 1	·	940 m	MPC · JPL
886244	2020 JK_{14}	—	June 7, 2016	Haleakala	Pan-STARRS 1	KON	1.6 km	MPC · JPL
886245	2020 JT_{14}	—	October 10, 2016	Haleakala	Pan-STARRS 1	TIR	1.8 km	MPC · JPL
886246	2020 JG_{15}	—	July 7, 2016	Mount Lemmon	Mount Lemmon Survey	·	1.1 km	MPC · JPL
886247	2020 JK_{17}	—	May 4, 2020	Haleakala	Pan-STARRS 1	·	1.5 km	MPC · JPL
886248	2020 JU_{18}	—	May 14, 2020	Haleakala	Pan-STARRS 1	·	780 m	MPC · JPL
886249	2020 JM_{19}	—	May 14, 2020	Haleakala	Pan-STARRS 1	·	1.2 km	MPC · JPL
886250	2020 JE_{24}	—	April 18, 2015	Cerro Tololo	DECam	·	1.1 km	MPC · JPL
886251	2020 JD_{25}	—	May 14, 2020	Haleakala	Pan-STARRS 1	·	970 m	MPC · JPL
886252	2020 JT_{30}	—	May 14, 2020	Haleakala	Pan-STARRS 1	·	800 m	MPC · JPL
886253	2020 JM_{32}	—	May 15, 2020	Haleakala	Pan-STARRS 1	EOS	1.4 km	MPC · JPL
886254	2020 JR_{32}	—	May 15, 2020	Haleakala	Pan-STARRS 1	EOS	1.3 km	MPC · JPL
886255	2020 JY_{36}	—	May 14, 2020	Haleakala	Pan-STARRS 1	·	1.1 km	MPC · JPL
886256	2020 JS_{38}	—	May 14, 2020	Haleakala	Pan-STARRS 1	·	1.2 km	MPC · JPL
886257	2020 JT_{41}	—	May 15, 2020	Haleakala	Pan-STARRS 1	·	1.8 km	MPC · JPL
886258	2020 JA_{53}	—	May 15, 2020	Haleakala	Pan-STARRS 1	L5	6.8 km	MPC · JPL
886259	2020 KJ_{12}	—	May 17, 2020	Haleakala	Pan-STARRS 1	L5	7.3 km	MPC · JPL
886260	2020 KG_{18}	—	May 30, 2020	Haleakala	Pan-STARRS 1	·	1.2 km	MPC · JPL
886261	2020 KT_{18}	—	May 20, 2020	Haleakala	Pan-STARRS 1	(5)	820 m	MPC · JPL
886262	2020 KA_{24}	—	May 17, 2020	Haleakala	Pan-STARRS 1	·	1.8 km	MPC · JPL
886263	2020 KN_{27}	—	May 21, 2020	Haleakala	Pan-STARRS 1	·	1.3 km	MPC · JPL
886264	2020 KQ_{28}	—	May 19, 2020	Haleakala	Pan-STARRS 1	·	2.3 km	MPC · JPL
886265	2020 KT_{37}	—	May 20, 2020	Haleakala	Pan-STARRS 1	·	2.0 km	MPC · JPL
886266	2020 KG_{39}	—	April 23, 2014	Cerro Tololo	DECam	·	1.7 km	MPC · JPL
886267	2020 KL_{42}	—	May 28, 2020	Haleakala	Pan-STARRS 1	·	960 m	MPC · JPL
886268	2020 KA_{43}	—	May 20, 2020	Haleakala	Pan-STARRS 1	·	1.2 km	MPC · JPL
886269	2020 KO_{45}	—	May 21, 2014	Haleakala	Pan-STARRS 1	·	1.9 km	MPC · JPL
886270	2020 KJ_{48}	—	May 20, 2020	Haleakala	Pan-STARRS 1	·	1.2 km	MPC · JPL
886271	2020 KL_{60}	—	May 21, 2020	Haleakala	Pan-STARRS 1	L5	7.5 km	MPC · JPL
886272	2020 KJ_{66}	—	January 20, 2015	Haleakala	Pan-STARRS 1	L5	6.2 km	MPC · JPL
886273	2020 KD_{69}	—	May 24, 2020	Haleakala	Pan-STARRS 1	·	1.5 km	MPC · JPL
886274	2020 LP	—	October 26, 2016	Mount Lemmon	Mount Lemmon Survey	TIN	650 m	MPC · JPL
886275	2020 LD_{3}	—	June 15, 2020	Haleakala	Pan-STARRS 1	APO	270 m	MPC · JPL
886276	2020 LY_{4}	—	June 15, 2020	Haleakala	Pan-STARRS 1	·	1.6 km	MPC · JPL
886277	2020 LU_{7}	—	June 1, 2020	Haleakala	Pan-STARRS 1	·	1.9 km	MPC · JPL
886278	2020 LA_{13}	—	June 11, 2020	Haleakala	Pan-STARRS 2	·	1.3 km	MPC · JPL
886279	2020 LN_{15}	—	June 14, 2020	Haleakala	Pan-STARRS 1	(5)	900 m	MPC · JPL
886280	2020 LE_{18}	—	June 14, 2020	Haleakala	Pan-STARRS 1	·	1.2 km	MPC · JPL
886281	2020 LV_{21}	—	June 15, 2020	Haleakala	Pan-STARRS 2	·	1.1 km	MPC · JPL
886282	2020 LA_{26}	—	June 14, 2020	Haleakala	Pan-STARRS 1	·	900 m	MPC · JPL
886283	2020 MC_{7}	—	June 26, 2020	Haleakala	Pan-STARRS 2	JUN	720 m	MPC · JPL
886284	2020 MN_{8}	—	June 30, 2020	Haleakala	Pan-STARRS 1	·	1.6 km	MPC · JPL
886285	2020 MS_{8}	—	June 21, 2020	Haleakala	Pan-STARRS 2	·	1.5 km	MPC · JPL
886286	2020 MY_{10}	—	June 29, 2020	Haleakala	Pan-STARRS 1	·	1.1 km	MPC · JPL
886287	2020 MM_{13}	—	June 16, 2020	Haleakala	Pan-STARRS 1	DOR	1.6 km	MPC · JPL
886288	2020 MJ_{20}	—	June 29, 2020	Haleakala	Pan-STARRS 1	·	1.5 km	MPC · JPL
886289	2020 ML_{20}	—	June 29, 2020	Haleakala	Pan-STARRS 1	·	1.3 km	MPC · JPL
886290	2020 ME_{24}	—	May 20, 2015	Cerro Tololo	DECam	·	1.1 km	MPC · JPL
886291	2020 MC_{37}	—	June 21, 2020	Haleakala	Pan-STARRS 1	EUN	860 m	MPC · JPL
886292	2020 MF_{38}	—	June 7, 2019	Haleakala	Pan-STARRS 1	(10369)	1.2 km	MPC · JPL
886293	2020 MM_{43}	—	June 17, 2020	Haleakala	Pan-STARRS 1	EUN	660 m	MPC · JPL
886294	2020 MB_{44}	—	September 24, 2017	Haleakala	Pan-STARRS 1	·	800 m	MPC · JPL
886295	2020 MM_{45}	—	May 21, 2015	Cerro Tololo	DECam	·	1.0 km	MPC · JPL
886296	2020 MF_{59}	—	June 29, 2020	Haleakala	Pan-STARRS 1	·	780 m	MPC · JPL
886297	2020 MT_{59}	—	June 17, 2020	Haleakala	Pan-STARRS 2	RAF	610 m	MPC · JPL
886298	2020 NS_{1}	—	July 9, 2020	Haleakala	Pan-STARRS 1	·	1.5 km	MPC · JPL
886299	2020 NX_{1}	—	December 30, 2007	Kitt Peak	Spacewatch	·	1.3 km	MPC · JPL
886300	2020 NZ_{1}	—	July 9, 2020	Haleakala	Pan-STARRS 1	·	1.4 km	MPC · JPL

== 886301–886400 ==
back to top

Designation			Discovery			Properties		Ref
Permanent	Provisional	Named after	Date	Site	Discoverer(s)	Category	Diam.	Ref
886301	2020 NG_{2}	—	September 21, 2007	XuYi	PMO NEO Survey Program	·	1.1 km	MPC · JPL
886302	2020 NK_{2}	—	July 2, 2020	Haleakala	Pan-STARRS 2	·	1.4 km	MPC · JPL
886303	2020 NT_{2}	—	July 14, 2020	Mount Lemmon	Mount Lemmon Survey	TIN	760 m	MPC · JPL
886304	2020 NW_{2}	—	July 14, 2020	Mount Lemmon	Mount Lemmon Survey	·	1.2 km	MPC · JPL
886305	2020 NP_{3}	—	April 18, 2015	Cerro Tololo	DECam	·	850 m	MPC · JPL
886306	2020 NQ_{4}	—	September 7, 2008	Mount Lemmon	Mount Lemmon Survey	·	840 m	MPC · JPL
886307	2020 OO_{8}	—	October 1, 2016	Mount Lemmon	Mount Lemmon Survey	·	1.1 km	MPC · JPL
886308	2020 OR_{8}	—	May 29, 2015	Haleakala	Pan-STARRS 1	·	1.5 km	MPC · JPL
886309	2020 OD_{10}	—	April 18, 2012	Mount Lemmon	Mount Lemmon Survey	·	940 m	MPC · JPL
886310	2020 ON_{10}	—	November 5, 2016	Mount Lemmon	Mount Lemmon Survey	·	1.0 km	MPC · JPL
886311	2020 OD_{12}	—	July 23, 2020	Haleakala	Pan-STARRS 1	DOR	1.5 km	MPC · JPL
886312	2020 OE_{12}	—	August 2, 2016	Haleakala	Pan-STARRS 1	·	940 m	MPC · JPL
886313	2020 OT_{12}	—	July 26, 2020	Mount Lemmon	Mount Lemmon Survey	·	1.2 km	MPC · JPL
886314	2020 OU_{12}	—	May 21, 2015	Cerro Tololo	DECam	·	1.2 km	MPC · JPL
886315	2020 OC_{13}	—	July 17, 2020	Haleakala	Pan-STARRS 1	·	900 m	MPC · JPL
886316	2020 OB_{17}	—	July 22, 2020	Haleakala	Pan-STARRS 2	·	1.3 km	MPC · JPL
886317	2020 OC_{17}	—	July 17, 2020	Haleakala	Pan-STARRS 1	NYS	660 m	MPC · JPL
886318	2020 OP_{17}	—	July 17, 2020	Haleakala	Pan-STARRS 1	·	1.2 km	MPC · JPL
886319	2020 OM_{21}	—	July 28, 2020	Haleakala	Pan-STARRS 1	·	1.5 km	MPC · JPL
886320	2020 OU_{22}	—	August 30, 2016	Mount Lemmon	Mount Lemmon Survey	MAR	570 m	MPC · JPL
886321	2020 OT_{30}	—	April 28, 2014	Cerro Tololo	DECam	·	1.4 km	MPC · JPL
886322	2020 OY_{30}	—	July 29, 2020	Haleakala	Pan-STARRS 1	·	1.5 km	MPC · JPL
886323	2020 OG_{34}	—	July 17, 2020	Haleakala	Pan-STARRS 1	·	1.4 km	MPC · JPL
886324	2020 OO_{37}	—	July 29, 2020	Haleakala	Pan-STARRS 1	·	1.2 km	MPC · JPL
886325	2020 OK_{38}	—	July 17, 2020	Haleakala	Pan-STARRS 1	·	1.2 km	MPC · JPL
886326	2020 OX_{38}	—	July 17, 2020	Haleakala	Pan-STARRS 1	AEO	820 m	MPC · JPL
886327	2020 OD_{39}	—	July 18, 2020	Mount Lemmon	Mount Lemmon Survey	·	970 m	MPC · JPL
886328	2020 OX_{41}	—	July 27, 2020	Mount Lemmon	Mount Lemmon Survey	EUN	750 m	MPC · JPL
886329	2020 OY_{42}	—	July 30, 2020	Mount Lemmon	Mount Lemmon Survey	·	1.1 km	MPC · JPL
886330	2020 OL_{43}	—	October 26, 2016	Haleakala	Pan-STARRS 1	AEO	710 m	MPC · JPL
886331	2020 OD_{44}	—	July 18, 2020	Haleakala	Pan-STARRS 2	·	1.3 km	MPC · JPL
886332	2020 OZ_{48}	—	July 29, 2020	Mount Lemmon	Mount Lemmon Survey	·	1.4 km	MPC · JPL
886333	2020 OK_{49}	—	July 30, 2020	Haleakala	Pan-STARRS 1	TRE	1.5 km	MPC · JPL
886334	2020 OU_{52}	—	April 28, 2014	Cerro Tololo	DECam	·	1.3 km	MPC · JPL
886335	2020 OD_{55}	—	July 18, 2020	Haleakala	Pan-STARRS 1	·	1.1 km	MPC · JPL
886336	2020 OT_{56}	—	July 22, 2020	Haleakala	Pan-STARRS 1	·	1.4 km	MPC · JPL
886337	2020 OE_{63}	—	April 28, 2014	Cerro Tololo	DECam	BRA	870 m	MPC · JPL
886338	2020 OJ_{64}	—	July 30, 2020	Haleakala	Pan-STARRS 1	·	2.2 km	MPC · JPL
886339	2020 OM_{64}	—	July 31, 2020	Haleakala	Pan-STARRS 1	·	920 m	MPC · JPL
886340	2020 OY_{65}	—	April 29, 2014	Cerro Tololo	DECam	·	1.2 km	MPC · JPL
886341	2020 OG_{91}	—	July 18, 2020	Haleakala	Pan-STARRS 1	·	1.2 km	MPC · JPL
886342	2020 OA_{107}	—	April 28, 2014	Cerro Tololo	DECam	·	1.5 km	MPC · JPL
886343	2020 OV_{107}	—	April 28, 2014	Cerro Tololo	DECam	H	270 m	MPC · JPL
886344	2020 OX_{143}	—	July 18, 2020	Haleakala	Pan-STARRS 1	·	1.2 km	MPC · JPL
886345	2020 PY_{1}	—	August 12, 2020	Haleakala	Pan-STARRS 1	APO	270 m	MPC · JPL
886346	2020 PE_{7}	—	August 1, 2020	Mount Lemmon	Mount Lemmon Survey	·	1.0 km	MPC · JPL
886347	2020 PT_{7}	—	August 13, 2020	Mount Lemmon	Mount Lemmon Survey	H	300 m	MPC · JPL
886348	2020 PO_{8}	—	August 1, 2020	Mount Lemmon	Mount Lemmon Survey	·	1.5 km	MPC · JPL
886349	2020 PQ_{8}	—	September 6, 2016	Mount Lemmon	Mount Lemmon Survey	·	1.1 km	MPC · JPL
886350	2020 PG_{9}	—	August 8, 2020	Haleakala	Pan-STARRS 1	·	1.1 km	MPC · JPL
886351	2020 PK_{13}	—	April 23, 2014	Cerro Tololo	DECam	·	1.1 km	MPC · JPL
886352	2020 PQ_{16}	—	August 13, 2012	Kitt Peak	Spacewatch	·	800 m	MPC · JPL
886353	2020 PR_{16}	—	August 13, 2020	Mount Lemmon	Mount Lemmon Survey	·	1.1 km	MPC · JPL
886354	2020 PU_{18}	—	August 14, 2020	Haleakala	Pan-STARRS 1	·	1.3 km	MPC · JPL
886355	2020 PQ_{19}	—	September 5, 2007	Mount Lemmon	Mount Lemmon Survey	·	990 m	MPC · JPL
886356	2020 PH_{20}	—	August 12, 2020	Haleakala	Pan-STARRS 1	·	1.3 km	MPC · JPL
886357	2020 PM_{20}	—	August 12, 2020	Haleakala	Pan-STARRS 1	·	1.2 km	MPC · JPL
886358	2020 PO_{24}	—	August 12, 2020	Haleakala	Pan-STARRS 1	·	1.0 km	MPC · JPL
886359	2020 PT_{24}	—	May 21, 2015	Cerro Tololo	DECam	·	1.1 km	MPC · JPL
886360	2020 PZ_{24}	—	August 12, 2020	Haleakala	Pan-STARRS 1	H	330 m	MPC · JPL
886361	2020 PC_{27}	—	August 14, 2020	Haleakala	Pan-STARRS 1	EOS	1.3 km	MPC · JPL
886362	2020 PD_{29}	—	August 13, 2020	Mount Lemmon	Mount Lemmon Survey	·	1.1 km	MPC · JPL
886363	2020 PW_{32}	—	March 28, 2015	Haleakala	Pan-STARRS 1	·	1.1 km	MPC · JPL
886364	2020 PE_{35}	—	April 23, 2014	Cerro Tololo	DECam	·	1.4 km	MPC · JPL
886365	2020 PV_{38}	—	April 25, 2014	Cerro Tololo-DECam	DECam	·	1.3 km	MPC · JPL
886366	2020 PR_{39}	—	August 1, 2020	Haleakala	Pan-STARRS 1	EOS	1.4 km	MPC · JPL
886367	2020 PT_{39}	—	August 1, 2020	Haleakala	Pan-STARRS 1	·	1.4 km	MPC · JPL
886368	2020 PL_{75}	—	May 1, 2016	Cerro Tololo	DECam	L4	5.3 km	MPC · JPL
886369	2020 PN_{78}	—	August 8, 2020	Haleakala	Pan-STARRS 1	H	380 m	MPC · JPL
886370	2020 QB_{4}	—	August 19, 2020	Palomar Mountain	Zwicky Transient Facility	PAL	1.3 km	MPC · JPL
886371	2020 QP_{5}	—	August 19, 2020	Haleakala	Pan-STARRS 1	T_{j} (2.91) · APO	760 m	MPC · JPL
886372	2020 QJ_{8}	—	August 16, 2020	Haleakala	Pan-STARRS 2	·	1.1 km	MPC · JPL
886373	2020 QR_{15}	—	August 18, 2020	Mount Lemmon	Mount Lemmon Survey	·	1.5 km	MPC · JPL
886374	2020 QY_{16}	—	August 18, 2020	Mount Lemmon	Mount Lemmon Survey	·	1.1 km	MPC · JPL
886375	2020 QD_{17}	—	August 18, 2020	Mount Lemmon	Mount Lemmon Survey	·	1.4 km	MPC · JPL
886376	2020 QB_{18}	—	August 22, 2020	Haleakala	Pan-STARRS 1	·	810 m	MPC · JPL
886377	2020 QF_{19}	—	August 17, 2020	Haleakala	Pan-STARRS 1	DOR	1.2 km	MPC · JPL
886378	2020 QL_{20}	—	August 28, 2020	Mount Lemmon	Mount Lemmon Survey	HNS	780 m	MPC · JPL
886379	2020 QO_{21}	—	August 18, 2020	Haleakala	Pan-STARRS 1	·	1.1 km	MPC · JPL
886380	2020 QU_{22}	—	August 23, 2020	Haleakala	Pan-STARRS 1	EOS	1.2 km	MPC · JPL
886381	2020 QD_{23}	—	August 23, 2020	Haleakala	Pan-STARRS 1	·	490 m	MPC · JPL
886382	2020 QE_{23}	—	May 1, 2016	Cerro Tololo	DECam	·	430 m	MPC · JPL
886383	2020 QH_{24}	—	August 23, 2020	Haleakala	Pan-STARRS 1	·	1.3 km	MPC · JPL
886384	2020 QZ_{27}	—	August 23, 2020	Haleakala	Pan-STARRS 1	EOS	1.2 km	MPC · JPL
886385	2020 QC_{28}	—	August 26, 2020	Mount Lemmon	Mount Lemmon Survey	·	1.0 km	MPC · JPL
886386	2020 QP_{30}	—	August 18, 2020	Haleakala	Pan-STARRS 1	·	1.5 km	MPC · JPL
886387	2020 QE_{31}	—	August 26, 2020	Mount Lemmon	Mount Lemmon Survey	·	1.3 km	MPC · JPL
886388	2020 QO_{33}	—	August 17, 2020	Haleakala	Pan-STARRS 2	·	1.5 km	MPC · JPL
886389	2020 QK_{36}	—	April 23, 2014	Cerro Tololo-DECam	DECam	·	900 m	MPC · JPL
886390	2020 QF_{38}	—	May 27, 2019	Haleakala	Pan-STARRS 1	·	1.4 km	MPC · JPL
886391	2020 QQ_{42}	—	August 22, 2020	Haleakala	Pan-STARRS 1	·	1.1 km	MPC · JPL
886392	2020 QO_{43}	—	October 10, 2016	Haleakala	Pan-STARRS 1	·	1.0 km	MPC · JPL
886393	2020 QH_{44}	—	April 4, 2014	Haleakala	Pan-STARRS 1	HNS	770 m	MPC · JPL
886394	2020 QZ_{45}	—	August 23, 2020	Haleakala	Pan-STARRS 1	·	1.9 km	MPC · JPL
886395	2020 QB_{48}	—	August 27, 2020	Haleakala	Pan-STARRS 2	·	1.2 km	MPC · JPL
886396	2020 QS_{48}	—	August 29, 2020	Mount Lemmon	Mount Lemmon Survey	·	1.6 km	MPC · JPL
886397	2020 QX_{48}	—	August 28, 2020	Mount Lemmon	Mount Lemmon Survey	·	900 m	MPC · JPL
886398	2020 QZ_{48}	—	August 28, 2020	Mount Lemmon	Mount Lemmon Survey	·	1.7 km	MPC · JPL
886399	2020 QG_{50}	—	August 18, 2020	Haleakala	Pan-STARRS 1	EOS	1.5 km	MPC · JPL
886400	2020 QE_{52}	—	August 27, 2020	Mount Lemmon	Mount Lemmon Survey	·	1.1 km	MPC · JPL

== 886401–886500 ==
back to top

Designation			Discovery			Properties		Ref
Permanent	Provisional	Named after	Date	Site	Discoverer(s)	Category	Diam.	Ref
886401	2020 QF_{52}	—	November 3, 2004	Kitt Peak	Spacewatch	·	1.2 km	MPC · JPL
886402	2020 QJ_{52}	—	August 28, 2020	Mount Lemmon	Mount Lemmon Survey	JUN	690 m	MPC · JPL
886403	2020 QG_{53}	—	August 23, 2020	Haleakala	Pan-STARRS 1	·	1.6 km	MPC · JPL
886404	2020 QJ_{53}	—	August 23, 2020	Haleakala	Pan-STARRS 1	·	1.4 km	MPC · JPL
886405	2020 QR_{53}	—	April 23, 2014	Cerro Tololo	DECam	·	1.1 km	MPC · JPL
886406	2020 QT_{53}	—	August 29, 2020	Mount Lemmon	Mount Lemmon Survey	·	1.8 km	MPC · JPL
886407	2020 QU_{53}	—	August 28, 2020	Mount Lemmon	Mount Lemmon Survey	H	350 m	MPC · JPL
886408	2020 QX_{57}	—	August 18, 2020	Haleakala	Pan-STARRS 1	·	1.4 km	MPC · JPL
886409	2020 QD_{61}	—	August 22, 2020	Haleakala	Pan-STARRS 1	·	1.2 km	MPC · JPL
886410	2020 QT_{62}	—	September 23, 2015	Haleakala	Pan-STARRS 1	BRA	950 m	MPC · JPL
886411	2020 QY_{69}	—	April 23, 2014	Cerro Tololo	DECam	·	1.1 km	MPC · JPL
886412	2020 QL_{79}	—	August 26, 2020	Mount Lemmon	Mount Lemmon Survey	·	1.0 km	MPC · JPL
886413	2020 QW_{83}	—	August 23, 2020	Haleakala	Pan-STARRS 1	·	1.7 km	MPC · JPL
886414	2020 QY_{85}	—	August 18, 2020	Mount Lemmon	Mount Lemmon Survey	·	820 m	MPC · JPL
886415	2020 QJ_{86}	—	August 17, 2020	Haleakala	Pan-STARRS 2	·	1.2 km	MPC · JPL
886416	2020 QN_{86}	—	April 29, 2014	Haleakala	Pan-STARRS 1	·	1.2 km	MPC · JPL
886417	2020 QT_{86}	—	August 16, 2020	Haleakala	Pan-STARRS 1	·	1.3 km	MPC · JPL
886418	2020 QF_{88}	—	August 18, 2020	Haleakala	Pan-STARRS 1	·	1.8 km	MPC · JPL
886419	2020 QC_{120}	—	August 23, 2020	Haleakala	Pan-STARRS 2	critical	1.2 km	MPC · JPL
886420	2020 RX_{4}	—	September 24, 2009	Mount Lemmon	Mount Lemmon Survey	·	580 m	MPC · JPL
886421	2020 RK_{24}	—	April 29, 2014	Haleakala	Pan-STARRS 1	·	1.5 km	MPC · JPL
886422	2020 RL_{26}	—	September 9, 2020	Haleakala	Pan-STARRS 1	KOR	960 m	MPC · JPL
886423	2020 RN_{26}	—	September 9, 2020	Haleakala	Pan-STARRS 2	JUN	970 m	MPC · JPL
886424	2020 RZ_{26}	—	September 13, 2020	Haleakala	Pan-STARRS 2	·	1.2 km	MPC · JPL
886425	2020 RQ_{27}	—	September 10, 2020	Mount Lemmon	Mount Lemmon Survey	KOR	970 m	MPC · JPL
886426	2020 RB_{28}	—	September 10, 2020	Haleakala	Pan-STARRS 1	AEO	800 m	MPC · JPL
886427	2020 RC_{28}	—	September 12, 2020	Haleakala	Pan-STARRS 1	·	960 m	MPC · JPL
886428	2020 RF_{37}	—	September 10, 2020	Haleakala	Pan-STARRS 1	MAR	630 m	MPC · JPL
886429	2020 RY_{41}	—	April 23, 2014	Cerro Tololo	DECam	·	1.1 km	MPC · JPL
886430	2020 RO_{42}	—	September 13, 2020	Haleakala	Pan-STARRS 1	·	1.1 km	MPC · JPL
886431	2020 RC_{45}	—	June 28, 2015	Haleakala	Pan-STARRS 1	·	1.3 km	MPC · JPL
886432	2020 RO_{45}	—	May 22, 2015	Haleakala	Pan-STARRS 1	·	990 m	MPC · JPL
886433	2020 RQ_{47}	—	September 14, 2020	Haleakala	Pan-STARRS 2	·	1.1 km	MPC · JPL
886434	2020 RS_{47}	—	September 14, 2020	Haleakala	Pan-STARRS 2	·	1.2 km	MPC · JPL
886435	2020 RB_{49}	—	September 4, 2020	Mount Lemmon	Mount Lemmon Survey	·	1.5 km	MPC · JPL
886436	2020 RP_{49}	—	December 14, 2015	Haleakala	Pan-STARRS 1	·	2.2 km	MPC · JPL
886437	2020 RB_{50}	—	December 21, 2008	Kitt Peak	Spacewatch	HNS	780 m	MPC · JPL
886438	2020 RN_{53}	—	September 14, 2020	Haleakala	Pan-STARRS 2	·	1.1 km	MPC · JPL
886439	2020 RK_{55}	—	September 12, 2020	Haleakala	Pan-STARRS 1	·	1.4 km	MPC · JPL
886440	2020 RK_{56}	—	September 13, 2020	Haleakala	Pan-STARRS 1	·	960 m	MPC · JPL
886441	2020 RZ_{56}	—	September 9, 2020	Haleakala	Pan-STARRS 1	·	1.0 km	MPC · JPL
886442	2020 RB_{58}	—	September 14, 2020	Haleakala	Pan-STARRS 1	·	1.3 km	MPC · JPL
886443	2020 RB_{64}	—	September 28, 2011	Mount Lemmon	Mount Lemmon Survey	·	1.0 km	MPC · JPL
886444	2020 RZ_{76}	—	October 1, 2011	Kitt Peak	Spacewatch	(13314)	1.3 km	MPC · JPL
886445	2020 RG_{92}	—	September 12, 2020	Haleakala	Pan-STARRS 1	·	1.7 km	MPC · JPL
886446	2020 RK_{104}	—	September 12, 2020	Haleakala	Pan-STARRS 1	DOR	1.7 km	MPC · JPL
886447	2020 RT_{104}	—	September 10, 2020	Mount Lemmon	Mount Lemmon Survey	·	840 m	MPC · JPL
886448	2020 RQ_{108}	—	January 15, 2007	Mauna Kea	P. A. Wiegert	KOR	970 m	MPC · JPL
886449	2020 RW_{108}	—	March 29, 2009	Kitt Peak	Spacewatch	·	1.2 km	MPC · JPL
886450	2020 RG_{111}	—	September 30, 2006	Mount Lemmon	Mount Lemmon Survey	·	1.3 km	MPC · JPL
886451	2020 RL_{117}	—	September 25, 2016	Haleakala	Pan-STARRS 1	·	890 m	MPC · JPL
886452	2020 RW_{124}	—	April 23, 2014	Cerro Tololo	DECam	·	1.1 km	MPC · JPL
886453	2020 RG_{126}	—	September 10, 2020	Haleakala	Pan-STARRS 1	·	980 m	MPC · JPL
886454	2020 RL_{127}	—	May 20, 2015	Cerro Tololo	DECam	·	740 m	MPC · JPL
886455	2020 RQ_{146}	—	September 10, 2020	Haleakala	Pan-STARRS 1	3:2	3.5 km	MPC · JPL
886456	2020 SG_{1}	—	September 17, 2020	Mount Lemmon	Mount Lemmon Survey	APO	380 m	MPC · JPL
886457	2020 SU_{9}	—	April 29, 2014	Cerro Tololo	DECam	·	1.3 km	MPC · JPL
886458	2020 ST_{10}	—	September 17, 2020	Haleakala	Pan-STARRS 1	·	1.3 km	MPC · JPL
886459	2020 SU_{10}	—	August 9, 2015	Haleakala	Pan-STARRS 1	·	1.4 km	MPC · JPL
886460	2020 SV_{10}	—	June 24, 2015	Haleakala	Pan-STARRS 1	·	1.5 km	MPC · JPL
886461	2020 SX_{10}	—	September 16, 2020	Haleakala	Pan-STARRS 1	·	930 m	MPC · JPL
886462	2020 SB_{13}	—	September 17, 2020	Haleakala	Pan-STARRS 1	·	1.1 km	MPC · JPL
886463	2020 SA_{14}	—	September 27, 2020	Mount Lemmon	Mount Lemmon Survey	·	2.0 km	MPC · JPL
886464	2020 SC_{14}	—	August 18, 2020	Haleakala	Pan-STARRS 1	JUN	610 m	MPC · JPL
886465	2020 SY_{17}	—	September 20, 2020	Mount Lemmon	Mount Lemmon Survey	·	1.1 km	MPC · JPL
886466	2020 SC_{19}	—	September 16, 2020	Haleakala	Pan-STARRS 1	·	1.3 km	MPC · JPL
886467	2020 SB_{20}	—	April 24, 2014	Cerro Tololo	DECam	·	1.3 km	MPC · JPL
886468	2020 SN_{20}	—	July 12, 2015	Haleakala	Pan-STARRS 1	EUN	810 m	MPC · JPL
886469	2020 SH_{21}	—	November 10, 2016	Haleakala	Pan-STARRS 1	HNS	880 m	MPC · JPL
886470	2020 ST_{22}	—	August 3, 2015	Haleakala	Pan-STARRS 1	·	1.4 km	MPC · JPL
886471	2020 SQ_{23}	—	October 25, 2016	Haleakala	Pan-STARRS 1	·	770 m	MPC · JPL
886472	2020 ST_{24}	—	April 23, 2014	Cerro Tololo	DECam	·	1.1 km	MPC · JPL
886473	2020 SZ_{24}	—	October 20, 2007	Mount Lemmon	Mount Lemmon Survey	·	1.2 km	MPC · JPL
886474	2020 SK_{25}	—	June 27, 2014	Haleakala	Pan-STARRS 1	·	1.5 km	MPC · JPL
886475	2020 SE_{27}	—	February 18, 2017	Haleakala	Pan-STARRS 1	·	1.8 km	MPC · JPL
886476	2020 SP_{27}	—	September 26, 2020	Haleakala	Pan-STARRS 1	·	1.0 km	MPC · JPL
886477	2020 SV_{27}	—	September 27, 2020	Haleakala	Pan-STARRS 1	critical	660 m	MPC · JPL
886478	2020 SB_{28}	—	September 17, 2020	Haleakala	Pan-STARRS 1	·	1.9 km	MPC · JPL
886479	2020 SD_{28}	—	September 26, 2020	Mount Lemmon	Mount Lemmon Survey	·	1.6 km	MPC · JPL
886480	2020 SJ_{29}	—	August 27, 2011	Haleakala	Pan-STARRS 1	·	1.1 km	MPC · JPL
886481	2020 SZ_{30}	—	September 21, 2020	Mount Lemmon	Mount Lemmon Survey	·	970 m	MPC · JPL
886482	2020 SR_{33}	—	March 21, 2017	Haleakala	Pan-STARRS 1	·	2.0 km	MPC · JPL
886483	2020 SH_{39}	—	September 28, 2020	Mount Lemmon	Mount Lemmon Survey	·	1.1 km	MPC · JPL
886484	2020 SY_{39}	—	September 17, 2020	Haleakala	Pan-STARRS 1	·	910 m	MPC · JPL
886485	2020 SN_{44}	—	September 17, 2020	Haleakala	Pan-STARRS 1	HNS	650 m	MPC · JPL
886486	2020 SL_{52}	—	September 22, 2020	Haleakala	Pan-STARRS 1	LIX	2.4 km	MPC · JPL
886487	2020 SD_{60}	—	March 10, 2014	Mount Lemmon	Mount Lemmon Survey	H	290 m	MPC · JPL
886488	2020 SE_{63}	—	October 8, 2008	Kitt Peak	Spacewatch	L4	5.6 km	MPC · JPL
886489	2020 SH_{66}	—	September 18, 2020	Mount Lemmon	Mount Lemmon Survey	·	1.1 km	MPC · JPL
886490	2020 SS_{67}	—	September 26, 2020	Haleakala	Pan-STARRS 1	KOR	990 m	MPC · JPL
886491	2020 SW_{69}	—	September 22, 2020	Haleakala	Pan-STARRS 1	·	2.0 km	MPC · JPL
886492	2020 SC_{70}	—	September 17, 2020	Haleakala	Pan-STARRS 1	MAR	750 m	MPC · JPL
886493	2020 SO_{71}	—	April 2, 2005	Mount Lemmon	Mount Lemmon Survey	·	1.4 km	MPC · JPL
886494	2020 SN_{76}	—	September 26, 2020	Haleakala	Pan-STARRS 1	·	1.3 km	MPC · JPL
886495	2020 SF_{77}	—	September 17, 2020	Haleakala	Pan-STARRS 1	·	1.4 km	MPC · JPL
886496	2020 SK_{81}	—	September 18, 2020	Haleakala	Pan-STARRS 1	·	590 m	MPC · JPL
886497	2020 SN_{81}	—	September 17, 2020	Mount Lemmon	Mount Lemmon Survey	·	890 m	MPC · JPL
886498	2020 SU_{82}	—	July 5, 2019	Cerro Tololo-DECam	DECam	HOF	1.6 km	MPC · JPL
886499	2020 SM_{85}	—	September 16, 2020	Haleakala	Pan-STARRS 2	(5)	920 m	MPC · JPL
886500	2020 SQ_{85}	—	April 28, 2014	Cerro Tololo	DECam	·	1.2 km	MPC · JPL

== 886501–886600 ==
back to top

Designation			Discovery			Properties		Ref
Permanent	Provisional	Named after	Date	Site	Discoverer(s)	Category	Diam.	Ref
886501	2020 SF_{86}	—	September 17, 2020	Haleakala	Pan-STARRS 2	DOR	1.5 km	MPC · JPL
886502	2020 SH_{86}	—	September 18, 2020	Haleakala	Pan-STARRS 1	·	850 m	MPC · JPL
886503	2020 SX_{88}	—	April 29, 2014	Cerro Tololo	DECam	ADE	1.3 km	MPC · JPL
886504	2020 SK_{90}	—	November 10, 2016	Mount Lemmon	Mount Lemmon Survey	EUN	780 m	MPC · JPL
886505	2020 TP_{7}	—	October 15, 2020	Haleakala	Pan-STARRS 2	APO	410 m	MPC · JPL
886506	2020 TU_{9}	—	July 25, 2015	Haleakala	Pan-STARRS 1	·	1.3 km	MPC · JPL
886507	2020 TO_{10}	—	April 23, 2014	Cerro Tololo	DECam	·	210 m	MPC · JPL
886508	2020 TO_{12}	—	September 10, 2007	Kitt Peak	Spacewatch	EUN	840 m	MPC · JPL
886509	2020 TY_{12}	—	November 13, 2015	Mount Lemmon	Mount Lemmon Survey	·	1.4 km	MPC · JPL
886510	2020 TB_{13}	—	August 18, 2020	Mount Lemmon	Mount Lemmon Survey	·	1.3 km	MPC · JPL
886511	2020 TH_{13}	—	October 11, 2020	Mount Lemmon	Mount Lemmon Survey	·	1.0 km	MPC · JPL
886512	2020 TP_{14}	—	April 23, 2014	Cerro Tololo	DECam	·	1.1 km	MPC · JPL
886513	2020 TP_{15}	—	January 20, 2017	Haleakala	Pan-STARRS 1	·	2.1 km	MPC · JPL
886514	2020 TM_{19}	—	September 23, 2015	Haleakala	Pan-STARRS 1	EOS	1.3 km	MPC · JPL
886515	2020 TD_{20}	—	September 27, 2009	Kitt Peak	Spacewatch	THM	1.5 km	MPC · JPL
886516	2020 TT_{21}	—	October 14, 2020	Haleakala	Pan-STARRS 1	·	990 m	MPC · JPL
886517	2020 TW_{22}	—	October 14, 2020	Haleakala	Pan-STARRS 2	·	1.6 km	MPC · JPL
886518	2020 TA_{23}	—	October 12, 2020	Mount Lemmon	Mount Lemmon Survey	H	330 m	MPC · JPL
886519	2020 TC_{23}	—	October 14, 2020	Haleakala	Pan-STARRS 2	HOF	2.1 km	MPC · JPL
886520	2020 TJ_{25}	—	October 14, 2020	Mount Lemmon	Mount Lemmon Survey	·	1.1 km	MPC · JPL
886521	2020 TL_{25}	—	October 14, 2020	Haleakala	Pan-STARRS 2	·	930 m	MPC · JPL
886522	2020 TX_{25}	—	October 15, 2020	Haleakala	Pan-STARRS 1	·	1.3 km	MPC · JPL
886523	2020 TO_{28}	—	October 15, 2020	Mount Lemmon	Mount Lemmon Survey	·	700 m	MPC · JPL
886524	2020 TH_{31}	—	October 15, 2020	Mount Lemmon	Mount Lemmon Survey	·	860 m	MPC · JPL
886525	2020 TM_{31}	—	October 11, 2020	Mount Lemmon	Mount Lemmon Survey	·	1.1 km	MPC · JPL
886526	2020 TW_{31}	—	October 13, 2020	Mount Lemmon	Mount Lemmon Survey	critical	1.6 km	MPC · JPL
886527	2020 TY_{31}	—	October 13, 2020	Mount Lemmon	Mount Lemmon Survey	·	1.3 km	MPC · JPL
886528	2020 TK_{32}	—	October 14, 2020	Haleakala	Pan-STARRS 1	MAR	710 m	MPC · JPL
886529	2020 TQ_{32}	—	October 15, 2020	Mount Lemmon	Mount Lemmon Survey	·	840 m	MPC · JPL
886530	2020 TQ_{37}	—	October 14, 2020	Mount Lemmon	Mount Lemmon Survey	·	1.4 km	MPC · JPL
886531	2020 TQ_{40}	—	October 12, 2020	Mount Lemmon	Mount Lemmon Survey	·	1.7 km	MPC · JPL
886532	2020 TT_{40}	—	November 1, 2015	Mount Lemmon	Mount Lemmon Survey	·	1.6 km	MPC · JPL
886533	2020 TC_{41}	—	October 13, 2020	Mount Lemmon	Mount Lemmon Survey	·	1.2 km	MPC · JPL
886534	2020 TU_{45}	—	October 8, 2007	Mount Lemmon	Mount Lemmon Survey	·	1.2 km	MPC · JPL
886535	2020 TJ_{46}	—	April 23, 2014	Cerro Tololo-DECam	DECam	·	990 m	MPC · JPL
886536	2020 TR_{52}	—	October 15, 2020	Haleakala	Pan-STARRS 1	·	1.2 km	MPC · JPL
886537	2020 TK_{58}	—	January 18, 2013	Haleakala	Pan-STARRS 1	·	1.1 km	MPC · JPL
886538	2020 TJ_{66}	—	October 10, 2020	Haleakala	Pan-STARRS 1	MAR	750 m	MPC · JPL
886539	2020 TY_{66}	—	October 12, 2020	Mount Lemmon	Mount Lemmon Survey	·	1.5 km	MPC · JPL
886540	2020 TO_{74}	—	October 15, 2020	Haleakala	Pan-STARRS 1	GEF	920 m	MPC · JPL
886541	2020 TD_{79}	—	October 15, 2020	Mount Lemmon	Mount Lemmon Survey	·	1.3 km	MPC · JPL
886542	2020 TE_{79}	—	October 13, 2020	Mount Lemmon	Mount Lemmon Survey	·	1.3 km	MPC · JPL
886543	2020 TK_{79}	—	October 15, 2020	Haleakala	Pan-STARRS 1	·	1.9 km	MPC · JPL
886544	2020 TT_{79}	—	October 8, 2020	Mount Lemmon	Mount Lemmon Survey	AGN	860 m	MPC · JPL
886545	2020 TZ_{79}	—	October 14, 2020	Mount Lemmon	Mount Lemmon Survey	·	1.4 km	MPC · JPL
886546	2020 TO_{83}	—	October 12, 2020	Mount Lemmon	Mount Lemmon Survey	EUN	770 m	MPC · JPL
886547	2020 TE_{93}	—	February 10, 2018	Mount Lemmon	Mount Lemmon Survey	MAR	720 m	MPC · JPL
886548	2020 TJ_{102}	—	October 9, 2020	Haleakala	Pan-STARRS 1	·	2.7 km	MPC · JPL
886549	2020 UW_{7}	—	November 12, 2015	Mount Lemmon	Mount Lemmon Survey	·	1.2 km	MPC · JPL
886550	2020 UW_{8}	—	October 23, 2020	Haleakala	Pan-STARRS 2	·	810 m	MPC · JPL
886551	2020 UH_{9}	—	October 20, 2020	Haleakala	Pan-STARRS 1	·	960 m	MPC · JPL
886552	2020 UY_{10}	—	October 22, 2020	Haleakala	Pan-STARRS 1	·	1.0 km	MPC · JPL
886553	2020 UC_{11}	—	October 20, 2020	Haleakala	Pan-STARRS 1	·	1.5 km	MPC · JPL
886554	2020 UD_{14}	—	October 22, 2020	Haleakala	Pan-STARRS 1	·	1.5 km	MPC · JPL
886555	2020 UD_{16}	—	October 16, 2020	Mount Lemmon	Mount Lemmon Survey	·	1.1 km	MPC · JPL
886556	2020 UW_{16}	—	October 20, 2020	Haleakala	Pan-STARRS 1	·	1.1 km	MPC · JPL
886557	2020 UU_{17}	—	October 23, 2020	Mount Lemmon	Mount Lemmon Survey	HNS	800 m	MPC · JPL
886558	2020 UA_{21}	—	April 29, 2014	Cerro Tololo	DECam	·	1.3 km	MPC · JPL
886559	2020 UT_{32}	—	October 22, 2020	Haleakala	Pan-STARRS 1	KOR	740 m	MPC · JPL
886560	2020 UV_{47}	—	September 9, 2015	Haleakala	Pan-STARRS 1	KOR	860 m	MPC · JPL
886561	2020 UN_{53}	—	October 25, 2020	Haleakala	Pan-STARRS 1	·	1.1 km	MPC · JPL
886562	2020 UR_{55}	—	April 21, 2014	Mount Lemmon	Mount Lemmon Survey	·	1 km	MPC · JPL
886563	2020 UF_{56}	—	February 21, 2009	Kitt Peak	Spacewatch	·	790 m	MPC · JPL
886564	2020 UG_{59}	—	January 18, 2013	Haleakala	Pan-STARRS 1	·	1.1 km	MPC · JPL
886565	2020 UZ_{67}	—	October 20, 2020	Cerro Tololo-DECam	DECam	THM	1.3 km	MPC · JPL
886566	2020 UX_{93}	—	September 13, 2020	Haleakala	Pan-STARRS 1	critical	1.0 km	MPC · JPL
886567	2020 VF_{8}	—	November 11, 2020	Mount Lemmon	Mount Lemmon Survey	·	1.6 km	MPC · JPL
886568	2020 VH_{8}	—	November 11, 2020	Mount Lemmon	Mount Lemmon Survey	HNS	870 m	MPC · JPL
886569	2020 VV_{14}	—	November 9, 2020	XuYi	PMO NEO Survey Program	·	1.0 km	MPC · JPL
886570	2020 VW_{17}	—	May 23, 2014	Haleakala	Pan-STARRS 1	·	1.0 km	MPC · JPL
886571	2020 VB_{18}	—	April 23, 2014	Cerro Tololo-DECam	DECam	(5)	640 m	MPC · JPL
886572	2020 VX_{26}	—	October 18, 2011	Kitt Peak	Spacewatch	(21344)	1.1 km	MPC · JPL
886573	2020 VY_{27}	—	November 11, 2020	Mount Lemmon	Mount Lemmon Survey	·	1.2 km	MPC · JPL
886574	2020 VF_{33}	—	November 11, 2020	Mount Lemmon	Mount Lemmon Survey	·	1.8 km	MPC · JPL
886575	2020 WY_{6}	—	November 20, 2020	Haleakala	Pan-STARRS 1	·	1.3 km	MPC · JPL
886576	2020 WP_{7}	—	November 16, 2020	Haleakala	Pan-STARRS 1	H	370 m	MPC · JPL
886577	2020 WD_{8}	—	November 18, 2020	Mount Lemmon	Mount Lemmon Survey	·	1.9 km	MPC · JPL
886578	2020 WZ_{12}	—	February 3, 2013	Haleakala	Pan-STARRS 1	(5)	710 m	MPC · JPL
886579	2020 WW_{17}	—	April 23, 2014	Cerro Tololo-DECam	DECam	(7744)	1.0 km	MPC · JPL
886580	2020 WY_{17}	—	March 12, 2016	Haleakala	Pan-STARRS 1	·	1.9 km	MPC · JPL
886581	2020 WM_{34}	—	November 16, 2020	Haleakala	Pan-STARRS 1	·	2.1 km	MPC · JPL
886582	2020 XS_{7}	—	December 4, 2020	Haleakala	Pan-STARRS 1	EUN	930 m	MPC · JPL
886583	2020 XP_{9}	—	December 11, 2020	Haleakala	Pan-STARRS 2	·	1.2 km	MPC · JPL
886584	2020 XU_{11}	—	December 11, 2020	Haleakala	Pan-STARRS 2	·	440 m	MPC · JPL
886585	2020 XM_{19}	—	December 11, 2020	Haleakala	Pan-STARRS 1	·	870 m	MPC · JPL
886586	2020 XA_{20}	—	December 11, 2020	Haleakala	Pan-STARRS 1	·	1.4 km	MPC · JPL
886587	2020 XW_{20}	—	February 10, 2016	Haleakala	Pan-STARRS 1	THM	1.7 km	MPC · JPL
886588	2020 XG_{28}	—	December 15, 2020	Kitt Peak	Spacewatch	·	610 m	MPC · JPL
886589	2020 YJ_{7}	—	October 12, 2014	Mount Lemmon	Mount Lemmon Survey	·	1.5 km	MPC · JPL
886590	2020 YW_{7}	—	December 24, 2020	Haleakala	Pan-STARRS 1	(1547) · critical	880 m	MPC · JPL
886591	2020 YC_{9}	—	January 15, 2010	Mount Lemmon	Mount Lemmon Survey	·	1.5 km	MPC · JPL
886592	2020 YR_{10}	—	December 25, 2020	Haleakala	Pan-STARRS 1	·	1.4 km	MPC · JPL
886593	2020 YV_{10}	—	July 27, 2019	Haleakala	Pan-STARRS 2	·	2.2 km	MPC · JPL
886594	2020 YX_{11}	—	March 12, 2016	Haleakala	Pan-STARRS 1	·	2.0 km	MPC · JPL
886595	2020 YR_{15}	—	June 23, 2010	Mount Lemmon	Mount Lemmon Survey	·	2.5 km	MPC · JPL
886596	2020 YZ_{19}	—	January 12, 2016	Haleakala	Pan-STARRS 1	BRA	1.1 km	MPC · JPL
886597	2021 AM_{3}	—	June 26, 2019	Palomar Mountain	Zwicky Transient Facility	·	1.9 km	MPC · JPL
886598	2021 AU_{9}	—	December 26, 2020	Mount Lemmon	Mount Lemmon Survey	·	1.8 km	MPC · JPL
886599	2021 AJ_{17}	—	January 14, 2021	Mount Lemmon	Mount Lemmon Survey	H	420 m	MPC · JPL
886600	2021 AC_{30}	—	January 11, 2021	Mount Lemmon	Mount Lemmon Survey	·	1.1 km	MPC · JPL

== 886601–886700 ==
back to top

Designation			Discovery			Properties		Ref
Permanent	Provisional	Named after	Date	Site	Discoverer(s)	Category	Diam.	Ref
886601	2021 BM_{4}	—	September 5, 2013	Westfield	International Astronomical Search Collaboration	VER	1.9 km	MPC · JPL
886602	2021 BJ_{7}	—	January 17, 2021	Mount Lemmon	Mount Lemmon Survey	URS	2.2 km	MPC · JPL
886603	2021 BU_{8}	—	March 31, 2016	Haleakala	Pan-STARRS 1	·	2.0 km	MPC · JPL
886604	2021 BW_{11}	—	April 2, 2016	Haleakala	Pan-STARRS 1	·	1.8 km	MPC · JPL
886605	2021 CY_{6}	—	February 7, 2021	Haleakala	Pan-STARRS 1	AMO	370 m	MPC · JPL
886606	2021 CM_{9}	—	February 13, 2021	Kitt Peak	Bok NEO Survey	T_{j} (2.87) · AMO	700 m	MPC · JPL
886607	2021 CL_{12}	—	October 25, 2019	Haleakala	Pan-STARRS 1	·	2.0 km	MPC · JPL
886608	2021 CT_{21}	—	February 7, 2021	Haleakala	Pan-STARRS 1	·	2.0 km	MPC · JPL
886609	2021 CM_{26}	—	February 12, 2021	Haleakala	Pan-STARRS 1	·	2.1 km	MPC · JPL
886610	2021 CV_{31}	—	February 10, 2016	Haleakala	Pan-STARRS 1	·	1.9 km	MPC · JPL
886611	2021 CC_{32}	—	October 22, 2019	Mount Lemmon	Mount Lemmon Survey	·	2.0 km	MPC · JPL
886612	2021 CX_{35}	—	February 8, 2021	Mount Lemmon	Mount Lemmon Survey	·	2.8 km	MPC · JPL
886613	2021 CW_{37}	—	February 10, 2021	Haleakala	Pan-STARRS 1	·	2.0 km	MPC · JPL
886614	2021 CW_{59}	—	February 12, 2021	Haleakala	Pan-STARRS 1	·	2.2 km	MPC · JPL
886615	2021 DQ_{6}	—	April 27, 2016	Mount Lemmon	Mount Lemmon Survey	·	1.9 km	MPC · JPL
886616	2021 DB_{9}	—	February 16, 2021	Haleakala	Pan-STARRS 1	·	2.4 km	MPC · JPL
886617	2021 EC_{9}	—	January 11, 2010	Kitt Peak	Spacewatch	·	1.6 km	MPC · JPL
886618	2021 EZ_{9}	—	January 26, 2015	Haleakala	Pan-STARRS 1	VER	2.0 km	MPC · JPL
886619	2021 EE_{10}	—	March 7, 2021	Mount Lemmon	Mount Lemmon Survey	TIR	2.1 km	MPC · JPL
886620	2021 EJ_{13}	—	April 30, 2016	Haleakala	Pan-STARRS 1	·	1.7 km	MPC · JPL
886621	2021 EM_{17}	—	July 1, 2013	Haleakala	Pan-STARRS 1	·	890 m	MPC · JPL
886622	2021 EL_{26}	—	March 15, 2021	Haleakala	Pan-STARRS 1	BRG	1.1 km	MPC · JPL
886623	2021 EY_{32}	—	August 14, 2018	Haleakala	Pan-STARRS 1	·	780 m	MPC · JPL
886624	2021 EF_{39}	—	March 15, 2021	Haleakala	Pan-STARRS 1	critical	870 m	MPC · JPL
886625	2021 EH_{40}	—	December 6, 2019	Mount Lemmon	Mount Lemmon Survey	·	900 m	MPC · JPL
886626	2021 EF_{42}	—	March 7, 2021	Mount Lemmon	Mount Lemmon Survey	·	740 m	MPC · JPL
886627	2021 FP_{4}	—	January 15, 2015	Haleakala	Pan-STARRS 1	TIR	2.2 km	MPC · JPL
886628	2021 FQ_{5}	—	March 23, 2021	Kitt Peak	Bok NEO Survey	·	880 m	MPC · JPL
886629	2021 FG_{8}	—	May 2, 2016	Haleakala	Pan-STARRS 1	·	1.4 km	MPC · JPL
886630	2021 FE_{12}	—	January 29, 2009	Mount Lemmon	Mount Lemmon Survey	·	2.7 km	MPC · JPL
886631	2021 FX_{12}	—	April 1, 2017	Haleakala	Pan-STARRS 1	·	770 m	MPC · JPL
886632	2021 FR_{15}	—	March 20, 2021	Kitt Peak	Bok NEO Survey	MIS	1.7 km	MPC · JPL
886633	2021 FG_{17}	—	August 15, 2013	Haleakala	Pan-STARRS 1	ADE	1.3 km	MPC · JPL
886634	2021 FE_{19}	—	March 22, 2021	Calar Alto-Schmidt	E. Schwab, Koschny, D.	·	1.9 km	MPC · JPL
886635	2021 FD_{24}	—	January 18, 2015	Haleakala	Pan-STARRS 1	·	2.0 km	MPC · JPL
886636	2021 FA_{29}	—	January 25, 2015	Haleakala	Pan-STARRS 1	·	1.9 km	MPC · JPL
886637	2021 FM_{29}	—	January 25, 2015	Haleakala	Pan-STARRS 1	·	2.2 km	MPC · JPL
886638	2021 FS_{40}	—	March 31, 2021	Cerro Tololo-DECam	DECam	·	2.1 km	MPC · JPL
886639	2021 GH_{4}	—	September 28, 2014	Haleakala	Pan-STARRS 1	H	320 m	MPC · JPL
886640	2021 GZ_{27}	—	January 26, 2015	Haleakala	Pan-STARRS 1	·	2.5 km	MPC · JPL
886641	2021 GM_{28}	—	April 12, 2008	Mount Lemmon	Mount Lemmon Survey	·	510 m	MPC · JPL
886642	2021 GN_{30}	—	September 3, 2013	Kitt Peak	Spacewatch	526	1.6 km	MPC · JPL
886643	2021 GZ_{50}	—	April 4, 2021	Mount Lemmon	Mount Lemmon Survey	critical	640 m	MPC · JPL
886644	2021 GL_{64}	—	April 7, 2021	Haleakala	Pan-STARRS 1	·	830 m	MPC · JPL
886645	2021 GO_{69}	—	April 6, 2021	Mount Lemmon	Mount Lemmon Survey	H	370 m	MPC · JPL
886646	2021 GA_{73}	—	April 7, 2021	Haleakala	Pan-STARRS 1	·	740 m	MPC · JPL
886647	2021 GE_{74}	—	June 5, 2016	Haleakala	Pan-STARRS 1	·	1.3 km	MPC · JPL
886648	2021 GP_{80}	—	October 5, 2013	Mount Lemmon	Mount Lemmon Survey	MRX	650 m	MPC · JPL
886649	2021 GN_{101}	—	April 10, 2021	Haleakala	Pan-STARRS 1	L5	5.7 km	MPC · JPL
886650	2021 GR_{101}	—	April 7, 2021	Haleakala	Pan-STARRS 1	L5	6.4 km	MPC · JPL
886651	2021 GM_{117}	—	April 14, 2021	Haleakala	Pan-STARRS 1	·	1.1 km	MPC · JPL
886652	2021 GQ_{132}	—	August 19, 2009	La Sagra	OAM	·	990 m	MPC · JPL
886653	2021 GD_{155}	—	August 12, 2018	Haleakala	Pan-STARRS 1	·	890 m	MPC · JPL
886654	2021 HA_{8}	—	April 21, 2021	Mount Lemmon	Mount Lemmon Survey	·	350 m	MPC · JPL
886655	2021 HJ_{10}	—	April 16, 2021	Haleakala	Pan-STARRS 1	MIS	1.4 km	MPC · JPL
886656	2021 HU_{10}	—	April 17, 2021	Haleakala	Pan-STARRS 1	·	820 m	MPC · JPL
886657	2021 HL_{12}	—	April 17, 2021	Haleakala	Pan-STARRS 1	L5	6.1 km	MPC · JPL
886658	2021 HN_{14}	—	April 17, 2021	Haleakala	Pan-STARRS 1	KON	1.4 km	MPC · JPL
886659	2021 HA_{19}	—	April 17, 2021	Haleakala	Pan-STARRS 1	·	1.4 km	MPC · JPL
886660	2021 HK_{26}	—	April 17, 2021	Haleakala	Pan-STARRS 1	·	900 m	MPC · JPL
886661	2021 HW_{41}	—	April 16, 2021	Haleakala	Pan-STARRS 1	L5	5.4 km	MPC · JPL
886662	2021 JY	—	May 1, 2021	Mauna Loa	ATLAS	APO · PHA	620 m	MPC · JPL
886663	2021 JW_{1}	—	May 4, 2021	Mount Lemmon	Mount Lemmon Survey	AMO	360 m	MPC · JPL
886664	2021 JV_{17}	—	November 17, 2014	Haleakala	Pan-STARRS 1	·	1.0 km	MPC · JPL
886665	2021 JJ_{18}	—	May 7, 2021	Palomar Mountain	Zwicky Transient Facility	·	970 m	MPC · JPL
886666	2021 JG_{22}	—	May 3, 2021	Haleakala	Pan-STARRS 1	·	980 m	MPC · JPL
886667	2021 JV_{22}	—	May 5, 2021	Mount Lemmon	Mount Lemmon Survey	L5	6.8 km	MPC · JPL
886668	2021 JY_{23}	—	May 4, 2021	Haleakala	Pan-STARRS 1	·	870 m	MPC · JPL
886669	2021 JV_{25}	—	May 12, 2021	Haleakala	Pan-STARRS 1	L5	6.4 km	MPC · JPL
886670	2021 JQ_{36}	—	January 9, 2015	Haleakala	Pan-STARRS 1	L5	6.4 km	MPC · JPL
886671	2021 JN_{46}	—	May 5, 2021	Cerro Tololo-DECam	DECam	critical	910 m	MPC · JPL
886672	2021 JE_{52}	—	May 12, 2021	Haleakala	Pan-STARRS 1	L5	6.0 km	MPC · JPL
886673	2021 JF_{52}	—	May 9, 2021	Mount Lemmon	Mount Lemmon Survey	T_{j} (2.63) · unusual	3.4 km	MPC · JPL
886674	2021 JZ_{65}	—	May 10, 2021	Cerro Tololo-DECam	DECam	·	1.3 km	MPC · JPL
886675	2021 JC_{66}	—	May 4, 2021	Haleakala	Pan-STARRS 1	·	740 m	MPC · JPL
886676	2021 KW_{3}	—	May 20, 2021	Mount Lemmon	Mount Lemmon Survey	H	310 m	MPC · JPL
886677	2021 KA_{6}	—	February 10, 2016	Haleakala	Pan-STARRS 1	EUN	660 m	MPC · JPL
886678	2021 KZ_{13}	—	May 30, 2021	Haleakala	Pan-STARRS 1	·	1.3 km	MPC · JPL
886679	2021 LM_{3}	—	June 8, 2021	Haleakala	Pan-STARRS 1	·	660 m	MPC · JPL
886680	2021 LX_{4}	—	June 7, 2021	Haleakala	Pan-STARRS 1	·	1.0 km	MPC · JPL
886681	2021 LQ_{9}	—	June 2, 2021	Haleakala	Pan-STARRS 1	L5	6.6 km	MPC · JPL
886682	2021 LY_{13}	—	September 2, 2017	Haleakala	Pan-STARRS 1	·	1.5 km	MPC · JPL
886683	2021 LG_{26}	—	June 3, 2021	Haleakala	Pan-STARRS 1	·	920 m	MPC · JPL
886684	2021 LH_{27}	—	June 7, 2021	Haleakala	Pan-STARRS 1	critical	730 m	MPC · JPL
886685	2021 MK_{7}	—	June 19, 2021	Haleakala	Pan-STARRS 1	·	720 m	MPC · JPL
886686	2021 MC_{16}	—	June 24, 2017	Haleakala	Pan-STARRS 1	·	760 m	MPC · JPL
886687	2021 MR_{16}	—	September 25, 2014	Catalina	CSS	·	770 m	MPC · JPL
886688	2021 ML_{21}	—	June 30, 2021	Haleakala	Pan-STARRS 1	·	1.3 km	MPC · JPL
886689	2021 NJ_{2}	—	July 9, 2021	Haleakala	Pan-STARRS 1	·	410 m	MPC · JPL
886690	2021 NV_{3}	—	April 22, 2020	Haleakala	Pan-STARRS 1	·	2.2 km	MPC · JPL
886691	2021 NL_{10}	—	August 5, 2017	Haleakala	Pan-STARRS 1	·	960 m	MPC · JPL
886692	2021 NA_{29}	—	July 13, 2021	Haleakala	Pan-STARRS 1	V	430 m	MPC · JPL
886693	2021 NU_{34}	—	April 15, 2013	Haleakala	Pan-STARRS 1	·	900 m	MPC · JPL
886694	2021 NF_{37}	—	July 10, 2021	Haleakala	Pan-STARRS 1	·	2.1 km	MPC · JPL
886695	2021 NZ_{40}	—	July 13, 2021	Haleakala	Pan-STARRS 1	·	910 m	MPC · JPL
886696	2021 NR_{42}	—	July 13, 2021	Haleakala	Pan-STARRS 1	·	860 m	MPC · JPL
886697	2021 NB_{52}	—	July 11, 2021	Haleakala	Pan-STARRS 1	·	920 m	MPC · JPL
886698	2021 NF_{58}	—	July 9, 2021	Haleakala	Pan-STARRS 1	·	510 m	MPC · JPL
886699	2021 OQ_{1}	—	August 4, 2002	Palomar Mountain	NEAT	·	490 m	MPC · JPL
886700	2021 OC_{5}	—	September 7, 2019	Mount Lemmon	Mount Lemmon Survey	APO	750 m	MPC · JPL

== 886701–886800 ==
back to top

Designation			Discovery			Properties		Ref
Permanent	Provisional	Named after	Date	Site	Discoverer(s)	Category	Diam.	Ref
886701	2021 OV_{7}	—	July 20, 2021	Haleakala	Pan-STARRS 1	·	950 m	MPC · JPL
886702	2021 OF_{19}	—	July 18, 2021	Haleakala	Pan-STARRS 1	·	490 m	MPC · JPL
886703	2021 PM_{2}	—	October 28, 2014	Haleakala	Pan-STARRS 1	·	980 m	MPC · JPL
886704	2021 PL_{8}	—	August 18, 2018	Haleakala	Pan-STARRS 1	·	450 m	MPC · JPL
886705	2021 PP_{11}	—	September 21, 2017	Haleakala	Pan-STARRS 1	(5)	510 m	MPC · JPL
886706	2021 PE_{14}	—	April 10, 2013	Haleakala	Pan-STARRS 1	ERI	920 m	MPC · JPL
886707	2021 PE_{17}	—	August 21, 2006	Kitt Peak	Spacewatch	NYS	900 m	MPC · JPL
886708	2021 PB_{26}	—	September 17, 2010	Mount Lemmon	Mount Lemmon Survey	HYG	2.2 km	MPC · JPL
886709	2021 PQ_{26}	—	August 10, 2021	Haleakala	Pan-STARRS 1	APO	640 m	MPC · JPL
886710	2021 PP_{38}	—	August 4, 2021	Haleakala	Pan-STARRS 1	·	760 m	MPC · JPL
886711	2021 PM_{62}	—	April 28, 2014	Cerro Tololo	DECam	·	2.1 km	MPC · JPL
886712	2021 PF_{73}	—	September 6, 2010	La Sagra	OAM	·	740 m	MPC · JPL
886713	2021 PN_{79}	—	September 24, 2017	Haleakala	Pan-STARRS 1	critical	680 m	MPC · JPL
886714	2021 PB_{88}	—	August 27, 2006	Kitt Peak	Spacewatch	·	580 m	MPC · JPL
886715	2021 PM_{99}	—	August 7, 2021	Haleakala	Pan-STARRS 1	·	920 m	MPC · JPL
886716	2021 PC_{100}	—	January 4, 2014	Haleakala	Pan-STARRS 1	·	910 m	MPC · JPL
886717	2021 PJ_{109}	—	August 9, 2021	Haleakala	Pan-STARRS 1	·	800 m	MPC · JPL
886718	2021 PX_{126}	—	March 31, 2016	Haleakala	Pan-STARRS 1	·	800 m	MPC · JPL
886719	2021 PP_{131}	—	April 18, 2015	Cerro Tololo	DECam	EUN	860 m	MPC · JPL
886720	2021 PN_{170}	—	August 2, 2021	Haleakala	Pan-STARRS 1	·	530 m	MPC · JPL
886721	2021 PB_{175}	—	August 8, 2021	Haleakala	Pan-STARRS 1	·	1.7 km	MPC · JPL
886722	2021 QW_{8}	—	July 27, 2017	Haleakala	Pan-STARRS 1	·	780 m	MPC · JPL
886723	2021 QV_{10}	—	August 16, 2021	Haleakala	Pan-STARRS 1	·	820 m	MPC · JPL
886724	2021 QB_{28}	—	September 19, 2014	Haleakala	Pan-STARRS 1	·	790 m	MPC · JPL
886725	2021 QA_{33}	—	September 28, 2011	ESA OGS	ESA OGS	·	430 m	MPC · JPL
886726	2021 QC_{43}	—	June 18, 2018	Haleakala	Pan-STARRS 1	·	800 m	MPC · JPL
886727	2021 QQ_{51}	—	August 16, 2021	Haleakala	Pan-STARRS 1	·	1.2 km	MPC · JPL
886728	2021 QM_{59}	—	August 17, 2021	Haleakala	Pan-STARRS 1	·	460 m	MPC · JPL
886729	2021 QF_{67}	—	July 16, 2021	Haleakala	Pan-STARRS 1	EUN	1.1 km	MPC · JPL
886730	2021 QP_{82}	—	August 21, 2021	Haleakala	Pan-STARRS 1	MAR	820 m	MPC · JPL
886731	2021 RB_{5}	—	September 4, 2021	Haleakala	Pan-STARRS 1	L4	6.6 km	MPC · JPL
886732	2021 RM_{12}	—	September 10, 2021	Haleakala	Pan-STARRS 1	AMO	180 m	MPC · JPL
886733	2021 RT_{12}	—	February 23, 2015	Haleakala	Pan-STARRS 1	·	1.2 km	MPC · JPL
886734	2021 RG_{21}	—	September 8, 2021	Mount Lemmon	Mount Lemmon Survey	·	940 m	MPC · JPL
886735	2021 RW_{21}	—	May 13, 2016	Haleakala	Pan-STARRS 1	·	1.1 km	MPC · JPL
886736	2021 RS_{22}	—	September 4, 2021	Haleakala	Pan-STARRS 2	·	1.1 km	MPC · JPL
886737	2021 RF_{23}	—	September 4, 2021	Haleakala	Pan-STARRS 2	·	1.1 km	MPC · JPL
886738	2021 RQ_{27}	—	September 16, 2006	Catalina	CSS	·	770 m	MPC · JPL
886739	2021 RN_{29}	—	September 5, 2021	Haleakala	Pan-STARRS 2	·	1.1 km	MPC · JPL
886740	2021 RT_{32}	—	September 4, 2021	Haleakala	Pan-STARRS 1	·	680 m	MPC · JPL
886741	2021 RH_{35}	—	September 4, 2021	Haleakala	Pan-STARRS 2	·	730 m	MPC · JPL
886742	2021 RK_{38}	—	September 7, 2021	Mount Lemmon	Mount Lemmon Survey	BRG	1.1 km	MPC · JPL
886743	2021 RP_{43}	—	September 21, 2009	Mount Lemmon	Mount Lemmon Survey	·	600 m	MPC · JPL
886744	2021 RH_{45}	—	September 5, 2021	Haleakala	Pan-STARRS 2	·	780 m	MPC · JPL
886745	2021 RE_{51}	—	September 28, 2011	Mount Lemmon	Mount Lemmon Survey	EOS	1.3 km	MPC · JPL
886746	2021 RC_{58}	—	September 8, 2021	Haleakala	Pan-STARRS 2	MAR	470 m	MPC · JPL
886747	2021 RL_{66}	—	September 5, 2021	Haleakala	Pan-STARRS 1	·	570 m	MPC · JPL
886748	2021 RN_{70}	—	February 26, 2008	Mount Lemmon	Mount Lemmon Survey	ERI	950 m	MPC · JPL
886749	2021 RF_{72}	—	September 7, 2021	Haleakala	Pan-STARRS 2	·	1.2 km	MPC · JPL
886750	2021 RE_{100}	—	September 4, 2021	Haleakala	Pan-STARRS 2	critical	640 m	MPC · JPL
886751	2021 RJ_{100}	—	November 9, 2013	Haleakala	Pan-STARRS 1	·	710 m	MPC · JPL
886752	2021 RO_{100}	—	September 6, 2021	Mount Lemmon	Mount Lemmon Survey	HNS	700 m	MPC · JPL
886753	2021 RR_{101}	—	September 15, 2021	Mount Lemmon	Mount Lemmon Survey	EUN	860 m	MPC · JPL
886754	2021 RN_{102}	—	September 4, 2021	Haleakala	Pan-STARRS 2	·	760 m	MPC · JPL
886755	2021 RQ_{102}	—	September 5, 2021	Haleakala	Pan-STARRS 1	·	640 m	MPC · JPL
886756	2021 RL_{103}	—	September 15, 2021	Haleakala	Pan-STARRS 1	EUN	720 m	MPC · JPL
886757	2021 RP_{103}	—	September 11, 2021	Haleakala	Pan-STARRS 1	critical	920 m	MPC · JPL
886758	2021 RE_{108}	—	September 4, 2021	Haleakala	Pan-STARRS 2	EUN	590 m	MPC · JPL
886759	2021 RV_{108}	—	May 21, 2015	Cerro Tololo	DECam	·	1.2 km	MPC · JPL
886760	2021 RA_{109}	—	April 18, 2015	Cerro Tololo	DECam	·	930 m	MPC · JPL
886761	2021 RB_{109}	—	November 27, 2014	Mount Lemmon	Mount Lemmon Survey	·	750 m	MPC · JPL
886762	2021 RE_{112}	—	January 21, 2014	Kitt Peak	Spacewatch	·	880 m	MPC · JPL
886763	2021 RG_{113}	—	September 4, 2021	Haleakala	Pan-STARRS 2	critical	840 m	MPC · JPL
886764	2021 RZ_{115}	—	September 5, 2021	Haleakala	Pan-STARRS 2	·	1.1 km	MPC · JPL
886765	2021 RY_{116}	—	September 4, 2021	Haleakala	Pan-STARRS 2	·	1.1 km	MPC · JPL
886766	2021 RQ_{120}	—	April 19, 2015	Cerro Tololo	DECam	EUN	630 m	MPC · JPL
886767	2021 RS_{120}	—	September 8, 2021	Mount Lemmon	Mount Lemmon Survey	critical	930 m	MPC · JPL
886768	2021 RY_{120}	—	September 11, 2021	Haleakala	Pan-STARRS 2	EUN	780 m	MPC · JPL
886769	2021 RX_{123}	—	April 18, 2015	Cerro Tololo	DECam	·	1.1 km	MPC · JPL
886770	2021 RY_{131}	—	September 5, 2021	Haleakala	Pan-STARRS 1	·	700 m	MPC · JPL
886771	2021 RZ_{131}	—	April 19, 2015	Cerro Tololo	DECam	·	760 m	MPC · JPL
886772	2021 RG_{133}	—	September 8, 2021	Mount Lemmon	Mount Lemmon Survey	·	1.2 km	MPC · JPL
886773	2021 RZ_{133}	—	September 8, 2021	Haleakala	Pan-STARRS 2	critical	890 m	MPC · JPL
886774	2021 RO_{135}	—	November 27, 2017	Mount Lemmon	Mount Lemmon Survey	·	960 m	MPC · JPL
886775	2021 RY_{136}	—	September 4, 2021	Haleakala	Pan-STARRS 2	·	910 m	MPC · JPL
886776	2021 RE_{137}	—	September 15, 2021	Haleakala	Pan-STARRS 2	·	850 m	MPC · JPL
886777	2021 RM_{137}	—	May 20, 2015	Cerro Tololo	DECam	·	960 m	MPC · JPL
886778	2021 RO_{137}	—	November 9, 2009	Mount Lemmon	Mount Lemmon Survey	·	560 m	MPC · JPL
886779	2021 RS_{141}	—	September 4, 2021	Haleakala	Pan-STARRS 2	EUN	670 m	MPC · JPL
886780	2021 RV_{141}	—	April 18, 2015	Cerro Tololo	DECam	ADE	1.2 km	MPC · JPL
886781	2021 RH_{142}	—	May 20, 2015	Cerro Tololo	DECam	(5)	860 m	MPC · JPL
886782	2021 RM_{142}	—	April 18, 2015	Cerro Tololo	DECam	·	980 m	MPC · JPL
886783	2021 RW_{143}	—	September 9, 2021	Mount Lemmon	Mount Lemmon Survey	·	740 m	MPC · JPL
886784	2021 RM_{144}	—	September 11, 2021	Haleakala	Pan-STARRS 2	·	930 m	MPC · JPL
886785	2021 RN_{144}	—	September 8, 2021	Haleakala	Pan-STARRS 2	·	930 m	MPC · JPL
886786	2021 RZ_{144}	—	September 10, 2021	Mount Lemmon	Mount Lemmon Survey	·	810 m	MPC · JPL
886787	2021 RQ_{145}	—	December 27, 2017	Mount Lemmon	Mount Lemmon Survey	·	1.2 km	MPC · JPL
886788	2021 RD_{146}	—	April 3, 2019	Haleakala	Pan-STARRS 1	·	920 m	MPC · JPL
886789	2021 RO_{146}	—	September 4, 2021	Haleakala	Pan-STARRS 2	·	950 m	MPC · JPL
886790	2021 RW_{146}	—	September 12, 2004	Kitt Peak	Spacewatch	·	700 m	MPC · JPL
886791	2021 RY_{146}	—	September 11, 2021	Haleakala	Pan-STARRS 2	·	760 m	MPC · JPL
886792	2021 RH_{147}	—	September 5, 2021	Haleakala	Pan-STARRS 2	·	1 km	MPC · JPL
886793	2021 RK_{147}	—	September 15, 2021	Haleakala	Pan-STARRS 1	·	1.0 km	MPC · JPL
886794	2021 RP_{147}	—	September 9, 2021	Haleakala	Pan-STARRS 2	·	770 m	MPC · JPL
886795	2021 RV_{149}	—	November 28, 2013	Kitt Peak	Spacewatch	RAF	640 m	MPC · JPL
886796	2021 RB_{150}	—	September 15, 2021	Haleakala	Pan-STARRS 2	·	700 m	MPC · JPL
886797	2021 RS_{151}	—	December 15, 2017	Mount Lemmon	Mount Lemmon Survey	·	800 m	MPC · JPL
886798	2021 RD_{152}	—	April 18, 2015	Cerro Tololo	DECam	KON	1.9 km	MPC · JPL
886799	2021 RX_{153}	—	April 18, 2015	Cerro Tololo	DECam	MAR	660 m	MPC · JPL
886800	2021 RH_{161}	—	September 9, 2021	Mount Lemmon	Mount Lemmon Survey	·	900 m	MPC · JPL

== 886801–886900 ==
back to top

Designation			Discovery			Properties		Ref
Permanent	Provisional	Named after	Date	Site	Discoverer(s)	Category	Diam.	Ref
886801	2021 RP_{164}	—	September 4, 2021	Haleakala	Pan-STARRS 2	·	700 m	MPC · JPL
886802	2021 RO_{180}	—	May 2, 2020	Haleakala	Pan-STARRS 1	·	870 m	MPC · JPL
886803	2021 RH_{185}	—	September 5, 2021	Haleakala	Pan-STARRS 1	·	390 m	MPC · JPL
886804	2021 RO_{196}	—	September 15, 2021	Mount Lemmon	Mount Lemmon Survey	critical	860 m	MPC · JPL
886805	2021 RT_{200}	—	September 4, 2021	Haleakala	Pan-STARRS 1	·	590 m	MPC · JPL
886806	2021 RE_{216}	—	September 4, 2021	Cerro Tololo-DECam	DECam	·	550 m	MPC · JPL
886807	2021 RP_{220}	—	September 4, 2021	Cerro Tololo-DECam	DECam	ULA	2.4 km	MPC · JPL
886808	2021 SR_{5}	—	December 20, 2014	Haleakala	Pan-STARRS 1	NYS	740 m	MPC · JPL
886809	2021 ST_{6}	—	October 23, 2017	Mount Lemmon	Mount Lemmon Survey	(5)	900 m	MPC · JPL
886810	2021 SK_{15}	—	August 31, 2017	Haleakala	Pan-STARRS 1	·	870 m	MPC · JPL
886811	2021 SX_{17}	—	May 2, 2014	Mount Lemmon	Mount Lemmon Survey	·	2.3 km	MPC · JPL
886812	2021 SC_{20}	—	May 1, 2016	Cerro Tololo	DECam	·	740 m	MPC · JPL
886813	2021 SM_{28}	—	September 27, 2021	Haleakala	Pan-STARRS 1	EUN	950 m	MPC · JPL
886814	2021 SN_{29}	—	October 10, 2008	Mount Lemmon	Mount Lemmon Survey	EUN	590 m	MPC · JPL
886815	2021 SL_{39}	—	September 16, 2021	Mount Lemmon	Mount Lemmon Survey	·	1.0 km	MPC · JPL
886816	2021 SM_{40}	—	April 18, 2015	Cerro Tololo	DECam	EUN	770 m	MPC · JPL
886817	2021 SN_{42}	—	September 16, 2021	Mount Lemmon	Mount Lemmon Survey	·	1.1 km	MPC · JPL
886818	2021 ST_{50}	—	December 31, 2013	Catalina	CSS	·	770 m	MPC · JPL
886819	2021 TA_{15}	—	October 13, 2021	Mount Lemmon	Mount Lemmon Survey	AMO	90 m	MPC · JPL
886820	2021 TX_{18}	—	May 22, 2015	Cerro Tololo	DECam	·	720 m	MPC · JPL
886821	2021 TO_{24}	—	October 1, 2021	Haleakala	Pan-STARRS 2	EUN	720 m	MPC · JPL
886822	2021 TG_{29}	—	February 19, 2014	Mount Lemmon	Mount Lemmon Survey	·	930 m	MPC · JPL
886823	2021 TW_{31}	—	April 18, 2015	Cerro Tololo	DECam	·	850 m	MPC · JPL
886824	2021 TJ_{37}	—	November 27, 2017	Mount Lemmon	Mount Lemmon Survey	EUN	790 m	MPC · JPL
886825	2021 TZ_{42}	—	October 8, 2012	Haleakala	Pan-STARRS 1	·	940 m	MPC · JPL
886826	2021 TM_{48}	—	October 11, 2021	Haleakala	Pan-STARRS 1	·	970 m	MPC · JPL
886827	2021 TO_{48}	—	October 11, 2021	Haleakala	Pan-STARRS 1	·	1.3 km	MPC · JPL
886828	2021 TX_{48}	—	November 9, 2009	Mount Lemmon	Mount Lemmon Survey	·	730 m	MPC · JPL
886829	2021 TR_{52}	—	November 16, 2017	Mount Lemmon	Mount Lemmon Survey	·	600 m	MPC · JPL
886830	2021 TQ_{55}	—	April 18, 2015	Cerro Tololo	DECam	·	870 m	MPC · JPL
886831	2021 TL_{56}	—	April 25, 2015	Cerro Tololo-DECam	DECam	(5)	930 m	MPC · JPL
886832	2021 TJ_{57}	—	October 3, 2021	Haleakala	Pan-STARRS 2	APO	180 m	MPC · JPL
886833	2021 TR_{60}	—	October 7, 2021	Mount Lemmon	Mount Lemmon Survey	MAR	730 m	MPC · JPL
886834	2021 TF_{63}	—	April 18, 2015	Cerro Tololo	DECam	·	1.0 km	MPC · JPL
886835	2021 TY_{66}	—	April 18, 2015	Cerro Tololo	DECam	(5)	710 m	MPC · JPL
886836	2021 TY_{72}	—	December 31, 2013	Haleakala	Pan-STARRS 1	·	630 m	MPC · JPL
886837	2021 TJ_{73}	—	April 21, 2015	Cerro Tololo	DECam	·	820 m	MPC · JPL
886838	2021 TZ_{76}	—	October 2, 2021	Haleakala	Pan-STARRS 2	MAR	720 m	MPC · JPL
886839	2021 TX_{77}	—	October 3, 2021	Kitt Peak	Bok NEO Survey	(5) · critical	700 m	MPC · JPL
886840	2021 TR_{90}	—	April 25, 2015	Haleakala	Pan-STARRS 1	·	960 m	MPC · JPL
886841	2021 TH_{95}	—	April 29, 2020	Haleakala	Pan-STARRS 1	·	1.0 km	MPC · JPL
886842	2021 TL_{95}	—	October 14, 2021	Haleakala	Pan-STARRS 1	·	950 m	MPC · JPL
886843	2021 TM_{95}	—	October 8, 2021	Mount Lemmon	Mount Lemmon Survey	·	1.0 km	MPC · JPL
886844	2021 TZ_{95}	—	July 12, 2016	Haleakala	Pan-STARRS 1	·	1.3 km	MPC · JPL
886845	2021 TN_{97}	—	August 23, 2008	Kitt Peak	Spacewatch	·	830 m	MPC · JPL
886846	2021 TY_{97}	—	October 2, 2021	Haleakala	Pan-STARRS 2	·	930 m	MPC · JPL
886847	2021 TA_{100}	—	October 13, 2021	Haleakala	Pan-STARRS 2	·	890 m	MPC · JPL
886848	2021 TE_{104}	—	October 8, 2021	Mount Lemmon	Mount Lemmon Survey	·	750 m	MPC · JPL
886849	2021 TN_{105}	—	October 1, 2008	Mount Lemmon	Mount Lemmon Survey	·	700 m	MPC · JPL
886850	2021 TO_{106}	—	December 25, 2017	Mount Lemmon	Mount Lemmon Survey	·	710 m	MPC · JPL
886851	2021 TV_{107}	—	September 25, 2008	Kitt Peak	Spacewatch	·	890 m	MPC · JPL
886852	2021 TN_{108}	—	April 18, 2015	Cerro Tololo	DECam	·	1.5 km	MPC · JPL
886853	2021 TX_{116}	—	October 1, 2021	Haleakala	Pan-STARRS 2	·	920 m	MPC · JPL
886854	2021 TY_{116}	—	April 18, 2015	Cerro Tololo	DECam	·	800 m	MPC · JPL
886855	2021 TW_{135}	—	July 29, 2008	Mount Lemmon	Mount Lemmon Survey	·	920 m	MPC · JPL
886856	2021 TR_{139}	—	October 13, 2021	Mount Lemmon	Mount Lemmon Survey	JUN	690 m	MPC · JPL
886857	2021 TC_{212}	—	October 1, 2021	Haleakala	Pan-STARRS 2	critical	810 m	MPC · JPL
886858	2021 UO	—	October 19, 2021	Haleakala	ATLAS	APO	280 m	MPC · JPL
886859	2021 UN_{7}	—	October 31, 2021	MAPS, San Pedro de	A. Maury, Attard, G.	ATE	80 m	MPC · JPL
886860	2021 UC_{9}	—	October 23, 2009	Catalina	CSS	·	1.0 km	MPC · JPL
886861	2021 UL_{13}	—	December 19, 2009	Kitt Peak	Spacewatch	·	640 m	MPC · JPL
886862	2021 UG_{15}	—	October 27, 2021	Mount Lemmon	Mount Lemmon Survey	·	1.2 km	MPC · JPL
886863	2021 UC_{17}	—	April 18, 2015	Cerro Tololo	DECam	MAR	660 m	MPC · JPL
886864	2021 UM_{18}	—	September 20, 2009	Mount Lemmon	Mount Lemmon Survey	·	680 m	MPC · JPL
886865	2021 UG_{24}	—	May 26, 2015	Haleakala	Pan-STARRS 1	·	1.5 km	MPC · JPL
886866	2021 UA_{33}	—	July 14, 2016	Haleakala	Pan-STARRS 1	·	950 m	MPC · JPL
886867	2021 UP_{35}	—	October 28, 2021	Haleakala	Pan-STARRS 2	EUN	1.0 km	MPC · JPL
886868	2021 UH_{38}	—	October 28, 2021	Haleakala	Pan-STARRS 2	EUN	710 m	MPC · JPL
886869	2021 UN_{40}	—	October 8, 2008	Kitt Peak	Spacewatch	·	720 m	MPC · JPL
886870	2021 UK_{41}	—	October 28, 2021	Haleakala	Pan-STARRS 2	(5)	830 m	MPC · JPL
886871	2021 UU_{42}	—	December 14, 2017	Mount Lemmon	Mount Lemmon Survey	(5)	930 m	MPC · JPL
886872	2021 UU_{46}	—	October 31, 2021	Haleakala	Pan-STARRS 2	·	720 m	MPC · JPL
886873	2021 UO_{47}	—	April 13, 2015	Haleakala	Pan-STARRS 1	·	800 m	MPC · JPL
886874	2021 UW_{47}	—	September 30, 2008	Kitt Peak	Spacewatch	·	960 m	MPC · JPL
886875	2021 UB_{49}	—	December 12, 2017	Haleakala	Pan-STARRS 1	·	860 m	MPC · JPL
886876	2021 UW_{49}	—	October 29, 2021	Kitt Peak	Bok NEO Survey	·	890 m	MPC · JPL
886877	2021 UD_{50}	—	September 3, 2000	Sacramento Peak	SDSS	critical	540 m	MPC · JPL
886878	2021 US_{50}	—	April 18, 2015	Cerro Tololo	DECam	·	870 m	MPC · JPL
886879	2021 UX_{53}	—	October 31, 2021	Haleakala	Pan-STARRS 2	KON	1.7 km	MPC · JPL
886880	2021 UP_{54}	—	October 28, 2021	Haleakala	Pan-STARRS 2	·	870 m	MPC · JPL
886881	2021 UX_{59}	—	October 27, 2021	Mount Lemmon	Mount Lemmon Survey	·	830 m	MPC · JPL
886882	2021 UN_{60}	—	May 20, 2015	Cerro Tololo	DECam	·	760 m	MPC · JPL
886883	2021 UO_{60}	—	May 21, 2015	Cerro Tololo	DECam	·	940 m	MPC · JPL
886884	2021 US_{61}	—	October 8, 2008	Mount Lemmon	Mount Lemmon Survey	·	980 m	MPC · JPL
886885	2021 UA_{63}	—	September 23, 2008	Kitt Peak	Spacewatch	·	880 m	MPC · JPL
886886	2021 UK_{64}	—	December 11, 2013	Haleakala	Pan-STARRS 1	KON	1.6 km	MPC · JPL
886887	2021 UH_{69}	—	May 20, 2015	Cerro Tololo	DECam	·	940 m	MPC · JPL
886888	2021 UA_{87}	—	October 31, 2021	Haleakala	Pan-STARRS 2	·	720 m	MPC · JPL
886889	2021 VP_{6}	—	November 8, 2021	Haleakala	Pan-STARRS 2	APO	170 m	MPC · JPL
886890	2021 VQ_{11}	—	November 9, 2021	Haleakala	Pan-STARRS 2	AMO	670 m	MPC · JPL
886891	2021 VX_{12}	—	April 24, 2020	Mount Lemmon	Mount Lemmon Survey	BAR	760 m	MPC · JPL
886892	2021 VN_{16}	—	July 12, 2016	Haleakala	Pan-STARRS 1	·	1.1 km	MPC · JPL
886893	2021 VQ_{19}	—	May 22, 2015	Cerro Tololo	DECam	·	1.0 km	MPC · JPL
886894	2021 VK_{26}	—	August 12, 2016	Haleakala	Pan-STARRS 1	·	1.1 km	MPC · JPL
886895	2021 VG_{29}	—	May 20, 2015	Cerro Tololo	DECam	·	790 m	MPC · JPL
886896	2021 VW_{34}	—	November 26, 2005	Kitt Peak	Spacewatch	·	740 m	MPC · JPL
886897	2021 VD_{35}	—	November 8, 2021	Mount Lemmon	Mount Lemmon Survey	critical	520 m	MPC · JPL
886898	2021 VH_{36}	—	August 15, 2021	Haleakala	Pan-STARRS 1	·	860 m	MPC · JPL
886899	2021 VV_{42}	—	December 31, 2013	Kitt Peak	Spacewatch	·	740 m	MPC · JPL
886900	2021 VR_{44}	—	June 19, 2015	Haleakala	Pan-STARRS 1	·	1.2 km	MPC · JPL

== 886901–887000 ==
back to top

Designation			Discovery			Properties		Ref
Permanent	Provisional	Named after	Date	Site	Discoverer(s)	Category	Diam.	Ref
886901	2021 VU_{46}	—	January 6, 2010	Mount Lemmon	Mount Lemmon Survey	·	770 m	MPC · JPL
886902	2021 VN_{48}	—	April 18, 2015	Cerro Tololo	DECam	·	990 m	MPC · JPL
886903	2021 VT_{51}	—	October 11, 2012	Haleakala	Pan-STARRS 1	·	1.1 km	MPC · JPL
886904	2021 VM_{69}	—	November 4, 2021	Mount Lemmon	Mount Lemmon Survey	EUN	700 m	MPC · JPL
886905	2021 VQ_{74}	—	November 3, 2021	Mount Lemmon	Mount Lemmon Survey	·	1.2 km	MPC · JPL
886906	2021 VW_{101}	—	November 1, 2021	Haleakala	Pan-STARRS 2	·	1.0 km	MPC · JPL
886907	2021 VF_{103}	—	November 5, 2021	Mount Lemmon	Mount Lemmon Survey	·	1.4 km	MPC · JPL
886908	2021 WE_{8}	—	November 28, 2021	Mount Lemmon	Mount Lemmon Survey	·	1.1 km	MPC · JPL
886909	2021 WH_{8}	—	January 6, 2013	Mount Lemmon	Mount Lemmon Survey	·	1.4 km	MPC · JPL
886910	2021 WC_{11}	—	November 9, 2020	Cerro Tololo-DECam	DECam	·	1.1 km	MPC · JPL
886911	2021 XB_{7}	—	November 30, 2008	Kitt Peak	Spacewatch	·	1.1 km	MPC · JPL
886912	2021 XZ_{8}	—	December 2, 2021	Kitt Peak	Bok NEO Survey	GEF	830 m	MPC · JPL
886913	2022 AT_{8}	—	January 6, 2022	Mount Lemmon	Mount Lemmon Survey	EUN	860 m	MPC · JPL
886914	2022 AM_{15}	—	January 6, 2022	Mount Lemmon	Mount Lemmon Survey	·	2.4 km	MPC · JPL
886915	2022 AP_{17}	—	December 10, 2020	Haleakala	Pan-STARRS 1	·	1.8 km	MPC · JPL
886916	2022 AA_{23}	—	September 4, 2020	Haleakala	Pan-STARRS 1	·	1.4 km	MPC · JPL
886917	2022 AS_{23}	—	January 4, 2022	Mount Lemmon	Mount Lemmon Survey	·	1.5 km	MPC · JPL
886918	2022 AJ_{25}	—	August 14, 2015	Haleakala	Pan-STARRS 1	·	1.5 km	MPC · JPL
886919	2022 AN_{51}	—	January 10, 2022	Haleakala	Pan-STARRS 2	·	2.2 km	MPC · JPL
886920	2022 BM_{8}	—	March 21, 2018	Mount Lemmon	Mount Lemmon Survey	·	990 m	MPC · JPL
886921	2022 BQ_{10}	—	January 24, 2022	Haleakala	Pan-STARRS 2	·	1.0 km	MPC · JPL
886922	2022 BR_{11}	—	March 17, 2012	Mount Lemmon	Mount Lemmon Survey	·	1.3 km	MPC · JPL
886923	2022 BG_{12}	—	January 20, 2018	Haleakala	Pan-STARRS 1	·	690 m	MPC · JPL
886924	2022 BT_{18}	—	January 22, 2013	Mount Lemmon	Mount Lemmon Survey	·	1.4 km	MPC · JPL
886925	2022 BO_{22}	—	February 15, 2013	Haleakala	Pan-STARRS 1	·	1.3 km	MPC · JPL
886926	2022 BJ_{23}	—	January 29, 2022	Haleakala	Pan-STARRS 2	·	2.0 km	MPC · JPL
886927	2022 BP_{26}	—	October 12, 2016	Haleakala	Pan-STARRS 1	·	980 m	MPC · JPL
886928	2022 BX_{29}	—	February 22, 2017	Mount Lemmon	Mount Lemmon Survey	EOS	1.4 km	MPC · JPL
886929	2022 BO_{38}	—	January 24, 2022	Haleakala	Pan-STARRS 2	·	1.1 km	MPC · JPL
886930	2022 BC_{52}	—	July 28, 2011	Haleakala	Pan-STARRS 1	·	1.1 km	MPC · JPL
886931	2022 BX_{54}	—	January 25, 2022	Haleakala	Pan-STARRS 2	·	940 m	MPC · JPL
886932	2022 BX_{58}	—	January 27, 2022	Haleakala	Pan-STARRS 2	·	710 m	MPC · JPL
886933	2022 CN_{1}	—	February 4, 2022	Mount Lemmon	Mount Lemmon Survey	AMO · PHA	180 m	MPC · JPL
886934	2022 CY_{7}	—	November 10, 2018	Haleakala	Pan-STARRS 2	·	780 m	MPC · JPL
886935	2022 CM_{12}	—	October 7, 2016	Haleakala	Pan-STARRS 1	·	890 m	MPC · JPL
886936	2022 CH_{13}	—	February 9, 2022	Mount Lemmon	Mount Lemmon Survey	·	1.3 km	MPC · JPL
886937	2022 CM_{18}	—	February 11, 2022	Haleakala	Pan-STARRS 2	EUN	790 m	MPC · JPL
886938	2022 CN_{24}	—	April 28, 2014	Cerro Tololo	DECam	·	860 m	MPC · JPL
886939	2022 CX_{36}	—	February 5, 2022	Mount Lemmon	Mount Lemmon Survey	EOS	1.3 km	MPC · JPL
886940	2022 DQ_{28}	—	February 26, 2022	Mount Lemmon	Mount Lemmon Survey	·	760 m	MPC · JPL
886941	2022 EJ_{7}	—	March 8, 2005	Mount Lemmon	Mount Lemmon Survey	·	940 m	MPC · JPL
886942	2022 ES_{7}	—	January 31, 2013	Calar Alto	G. Hahn, S. Hellmich	·	970 m	MPC · JPL
886943	2022 EZ_{12}	—	March 5, 2022	Mount Lemmon	Mount Lemmon Survey	·	870 m	MPC · JPL
886944	2022 FF_{6}	—	March 25, 2022	Haleakala	Pan-STARRS 2	·	2.1 km	MPC · JPL
886945	2022 FO_{7}	—	March 24, 2022	Mount Lemmon	Mount Lemmon Survey	·	1.9 km	MPC · JPL
886946	2022 FX_{9}	—	March 31, 2022	Haleakala	Pan-STARRS 2	·	1.7 km	MPC · JPL
886947	2022 FG_{13}	—	March 28, 2022	Haleakala	Pan-STARRS 2	·	1.1 km	MPC · JPL
886948	2022 GC_{13}	—	April 7, 2022	Haleakala	Pan-STARRS 2	·	2.0 km	MPC · JPL
886949	2022 HR_{22}	—	April 23, 2022	Haleakala	Pan-STARRS 2	·	1.4 km	MPC · JPL
886950	2022 HN_{25}	—	April 24, 2022	Cerro Paranal	Altmann, M., Prusti, T.	·	2.1 km	MPC · JPL
886951	2022 JZ_{5}	—	May 9, 2022	Haleakala	Pan-STARRS 2	·	2.8 km	MPC · JPL
886952	2022 KN_{4}	—	December 4, 2016	Mount Lemmon	Mount Lemmon Survey	·	1.6 km	MPC · JPL
886953	2022 KU_{41}	—	May 22, 2022	Haleakala	Pan-STARRS 2	T_{j} (2.49) · unusual	7.4 km	MPC · JPL
886954	2022 LJ_{7}	—	June 4, 2022	Haleakala	Pan-STARRS 2	L5	6.0 km	MPC · JPL
886955	2022 LB_{19}	—	June 9, 2022	Haleakala	Pan-STARRS 2	L5	6.4 km	MPC · JPL
886956	2022 MC_{7}	—	September 5, 2013	Catalina	CSS	·	1.6 km	MPC · JPL
886957	2022 MM_{14}	—	June 29, 2022	Haleakala	Pan-STARRS 2	L5	7.5 km	MPC · JPL
886958	2022 OV_{15}	—	July 29, 2022	Haleakala	Pan-STARRS 2	L5	7.2 km	MPC · JPL
886959	2022 OR_{18}	—	July 28, 2022	Haleakala	Pan-STARRS 2	L5	6.2 km	MPC · JPL
886960	2022 ON_{21}	—	June 19, 2013	Haleakala	Pan-STARRS 1	JUN	590 m	MPC · JPL
886961	2022 OD_{22}	—	July 26, 2022	Haleakala	Pan-STARRS 2	L5	5.7 km	MPC · JPL
886962	2022 OK_{85}	—	July 26, 2022	Haleakala	Pan-STARRS 2	L5	5.8 km	MPC · JPL
886963	2022 PG_{4}	—	April 2, 2016	Haleakala	Pan-STARRS 1	·	1.3 km	MPC · JPL
886964	2022 PM_{30}	—	August 8, 2022	Haleakala	Pan-STARRS 2	·	380 m	MPC · JPL
886965	2022 QO_{52}	—	August 19, 2022	Haleakala	Pan-STARRS 1	·	1.3 km	MPC · JPL
886966	2022 QP_{55}	—	November 4, 2018	Mount Lemmon	Mount Lemmon Survey	·	1.3 km	MPC · JPL
886967	2022 QO_{84}	—	August 1, 2016	Haleakala	Pan-STARRS 1	·	2.3 km	MPC · JPL
886968	2022 QX_{103}	—	August 26, 2022	Haleakala	Pan-STARRS 1	·	620 m	MPC · JPL
886969	2022 QQ_{106}	—	August 17, 2022	Haleakala	Pan-STARRS 2	·	720 m	MPC · JPL
886970	2022 QS_{109}	—	August 20, 2009	Kitt Peak	Spacewatch	·	1.0 km	MPC · JPL
886971	2022 QO_{261}	—	August 18, 2022	Haleakala	Pan-STARRS 2	L5	6.9 km	MPC · JPL
886972	2022 RN_{75}	—	September 2, 2022	Haleakala	Pan-STARRS 1	·	1.4 km	MPC · JPL
886973	2022 RL_{77}	—	October 1, 2017	Haleakala	Pan-STARRS 1	BRA	1.1 km	MPC · JPL
886974	2022 SV_{8}	—	September 17, 2022	Haleakala	Pan-STARRS 1	·	1.4 km	MPC · JPL
886975	2022 SR_{28}	—	September 18, 2022	Kitt Peak	Bok NEO Survey	H	300 m	MPC · JPL
886976	2022 SN_{36}	—	November 25, 2014	Haleakala	Pan-STARRS 1	H	340 m	MPC · JPL
886977	2022 SE_{56}	—	October 20, 2001	Anderson Mesa	LONEOS	·	1.2 km	MPC · JPL
886978	2022 SG_{78}	—	September 23, 2022	Mount Lemmon	Mount Lemmon Survey	·	890 m	MPC · JPL
886979	2022 SN_{78}	—	September 14, 2013	Haleakala	Pan-STARRS 1	·	1.2 km	MPC · JPL
886980	2022 SZ_{94}	—	October 26, 2011	Haleakala	Pan-STARRS 1	VER	1.9 km	MPC · JPL
886981	2022 ST_{228}	—	September 17, 2022	Kitt Peak	Bok NEO Survey	·	2.1 km	MPC · JPL
886982	2022 SH_{233}	—	August 10, 2012	Kitt Peak	Spacewatch	·	440 m	MPC · JPL
886983	2022 TF_{6}	—	November 27, 2017	Mount Lemmon	Mount Lemmon Survey	·	1.2 km	MPC · JPL
886984	2022 UX_{13}	—	October 17, 2022	Mount Lemmon	Mount Lemmon Survey	critical	390 m	MPC · JPL
886985	2022 UY_{21}	—	October 29, 2022	GINOP-KHK, Piszkes	K. Sárneczky	APO	640 m	MPC · JPL
886986	2022 UZ_{21}	—	October 17, 2022	Haleakala	Pan-STARRS 1	AMO	240 m	MPC · JPL
886987	2022 UC_{29}	—	August 10, 2016	Haleakala	Pan-STARRS 1	·	1.4 km	MPC · JPL
886988	2022 UH_{50}	—	October 17, 2022	Haleakala	Pan-STARRS 1	L4	7.2 km	MPC · JPL
886989	2022 UM_{98}	—	October 23, 2022	Haleakala	Pan-STARRS 2	·	350 m	MPC · JPL
886990	2022 UP_{174}	—	October 18, 2022	Haleakala	Pan-STARRS 2	·	380 m	MPC · JPL
886991	2023 DK_{6}	—	February 26, 2023	Cerro Tololo-DECam	DECam	critical	1.1 km	MPC · JPL
886992	2023 EJ_{15}	—	January 27, 2017	Mount Lemmon	Mount Lemmon Survey	·	1.9 km	MPC · JPL
886993	2023 EN_{16}	—	March 14, 2023	Mount Lemmon	Mount Lemmon Survey	·	1.7 km	MPC · JPL
886994	2023 FO_{8}	—	February 16, 2012	Haleakala	Pan-STARRS 1	critical	1.5 km	MPC · JPL
886995	2023 FV_{9}	—	October 26, 2016	Haleakala	Pan-STARRS 1	·	940 m	MPC · JPL
886996	2023 FX_{11}	—	September 5, 2007	Mount Lemmon	Mount Lemmon Survey	T_{j} (2.98)	1.2 km	MPC · JPL
886997	2023 FZ_{18}	—	May 5, 2014	Mount Lemmon	Mount Lemmon Survey	·	1.2 km	MPC · JPL
886998	2023 FT_{19}	—	September 9, 2020	Haleakala	Pan-STARRS 1	KOR	1.1 km	MPC · JPL
886999	2023 FP_{54}	—	September 16, 2017	Haleakala	Pan-STARRS 1	T_{j} (2.99) · 3:2	3.8 km	MPC · JPL
887000	2023 GS_{4}	—	April 14, 2023	Haleakala	Pan-STARRS 2	·	1.9 km	MPC · JPL

back to top

== See also ==
- Meanings of minor-planet names: 886001–887000
