= List of minor planets: 847001–848000 =

The following is a partial list of minor planets, running from minor-planet number 847001 through 848000, inclusive. The primary data for this and other partial lists is based on JPL's "Small-Body Orbital Elements" and data available from the Minor Planet Center. Critical list information is also provided by the MPC, unless otherwise specified from Lowell Observatory. A detailed description of the table's columns and additional sources are given on the main page including a complete list of every page in this series, and a statistical break-up on the dynamical classification of minor planets.

Also see the summary list of all named bodies in numerical and alphabetical order, and the corresponding naming citations for the number range of this particular list. New namings may only be added to this list after official publication, as the preannouncement of names is condemned by the Working Group for Small Bodies Nomenclature of the International Astronomical Union.

Near-Earth obj.	MBA (inner)	MBA (outer)	Centaur
Mars-crosser	MBA (middle)	Jupiter trojan	Trans-Neptunian obj.
Unclassified

== 847001–847100 ==
Designation			Discovery			Properties		Ref
Permanent	Provisional	Named after	Date	Site	Discoverer(s)	Category	Diam.	Ref
847001	2021 DK_{24}	—	November 26, 2014	Haleakala	Pan-STARRS 1	·	1.2 km	MPC · JPL
847002	2021 EK_{9}	—	March 7, 2021	Mount Lemmon	Mount Lemmon Survey	·	450 m	MPC · JPL
847003	2021 EW_{12}	—	April 12, 2018	Haleakala	Pan-STARRS 1	·	480 m	MPC · JPL
847004	2021 ES_{14}	—	September 4, 2008	Kitt Peak	Spacewatch	·	560 m	MPC · JPL
847005	2021 EH_{17}	—	October 14, 2014	Mount Lemmon	Mount Lemmon Survey	KON	1.7 km	MPC · JPL
847006	2021 EA_{18}	—	March 15, 2021	Haleakala	Pan-STARRS 1	EUN	750 m	MPC · JPL
847007	2021 EY_{21}	—	August 8, 2018	Haleakala	Pan-STARRS 1	MAS	530 m	MPC · JPL
847008	2021 EL_{27}	—	November 10, 2016	Haleakala	Pan-STARRS 1	ERI	920 m	MPC · JPL
847009	2021 EA_{35}	—	October 9, 2008	Kitt Peak	Spacewatch	·	850 m	MPC · JPL
847010	2021 ES_{38}	—	November 20, 2014	Mount Lemmon	Mount Lemmon Survey	EOS	1.4 km	MPC · JPL
847011	2021 EY_{40}	—	July 27, 2017	Haleakala	Pan-STARRS 1	·	2.4 km	MPC · JPL
847012	2021 ES_{47}	—	October 2, 2006	Mount Lemmon	Mount Lemmon Survey	·	2.4 km	MPC · JPL
847013	2021 FT_{5}	—	March 22, 2021	Kitt Peak	Bok NEO Survey	·	500 m	MPC · JPL
847014	2021 FG_{7}	—	April 10, 2014	Haleakala	Pan-STARRS 1	·	780 m	MPC · JPL
847015	2021 FQ_{8}	—	September 5, 2008	Kitt Peak	Spacewatch	·	560 m	MPC · JPL
847016	2021 FR_{17}	—	July 1, 2010	WISE	WISE	·	2.6 km	MPC · JPL
847017	2021 FX_{17}	—	January 26, 2017	Mount Lemmon	Mount Lemmon Survey	·	640 m	MPC · JPL
847018	2021 FZ_{25}	—	March 18, 2021	Haleakala	Pan-STARRS 1	·	960 m	MPC · JPL
847019	2021 FU_{35}	—	March 19, 2021	Mount Lemmon	Mount Lemmon Survey	H	400 m	MPC · JPL
847020	2021 FF_{38}	—	March 23, 2021	Kitt Peak	Bok NEO Survey	·	750 m	MPC · JPL
847021	2021 FR_{50}	—	March 18, 2021	Haleakala	Pan-STARRS 1	·	1.2 km	MPC · JPL
847022	2021 GO_{5}	—	April 13, 2010	WISE	WISE	·	2.2 km	MPC · JPL
847023	2021 GK_{12}	—	September 19, 1998	Sacramento Peak	SDSS	·	970 m	MPC · JPL
847024	2021 GY_{20}	—	July 25, 2014	Haleakala	Pan-STARRS 1	·	770 m	MPC · JPL
847025	2021 GV_{23}	—	January 27, 2017	Haleakala	Pan-STARRS 1	·	820 m	MPC · JPL
847026	2021 GL_{27}	—	May 1, 2016	Cerro Tololo	DECam	·	1.9 km	MPC · JPL
847027	2021 GW_{27}	—	April 7, 2021	Haleakala	Pan-STARRS 2	·	500 m	MPC · JPL
847028	2021 GX_{29}	—	January 27, 2017	Haleakala	Pan-STARRS 1	·	700 m	MPC · JPL
847029	2021 GM_{36}	—	June 14, 2013	Mount Lemmon	Mount Lemmon Survey	·	830 m	MPC · JPL
847030	2021 GJ_{38}	—	April 3, 2021	Mount Lemmon	Mount Lemmon Survey	·	780 m	MPC · JPL
847031	2021 GW_{49}	—	March 18, 2010	Mount Lemmon	Mount Lemmon Survey	·	760 m	MPC · JPL
847032	2021 GW_{52}	—	April 30, 2014	Haleakala	Pan-STARRS 1	V	400 m	MPC · JPL
847033	2021 GA_{53}	—	April 8, 2021	Haleakala	Pan-STARRS 1	L5	6.8 km	MPC · JPL
847034	2021 GE_{59}	—	April 9, 2021	Haleakala	Pan-STARRS 2	AMO	630 m	MPC · JPL
847035	2021 GR_{60}	—	January 27, 2007	Kitt Peak	Spacewatch	·	480 m	MPC · JPL
847036	2021 GZ_{70}	—	April 29, 2014	Haleakala	Pan-STARRS 1	·	480 m	MPC · JPL
847037	2021 GG_{80}	—	April 10, 2021	Haleakala	Pan-STARRS 1	MAS	490 m	MPC · JPL
847038	2021 GW_{80}	—	July 19, 2018	Haleakala	Pan-STARRS 2	·	700 m	MPC · JPL
847039	2021 GG_{81}	—	May 27, 2012	Mount Lemmon	Mount Lemmon Survey	·	1.4 km	MPC · JPL
847040	2021 GA_{86}	—	June 18, 2010	Mount Lemmon	Mount Lemmon Survey	·	2.0 km	MPC · JPL
847041	2021 GL_{100}	—	May 21, 2014	Haleakala	Pan-STARRS 1	·	740 m	MPC · JPL
847042	2021 GR_{124}	—	May 21, 2014	Haleakala	Pan-STARRS 1	·	480 m	MPC · JPL
847043	2021 GD_{130}	—	November 23, 2016	Mount Lemmon	Mount Lemmon Survey	·	440 m	MPC · JPL
847044	2021 GF_{137}	—	September 20, 2008	Kitt Peak	Spacewatch	·	1.4 km	MPC · JPL
847045	2021 GG_{146}	—	September 23, 2004	Hoher List	E. W. Elst	·	730 m	MPC · JPL
847046	2021 GE_{159}	—	October 22, 2012	Haleakala	Pan-STARRS 1	(1118)	2.4 km	MPC · JPL
847047	2021 GU_{166}	—	April 3, 2021	Mount Lemmon	Mount Lemmon Survey	DOR	1.9 km	MPC · JPL
847048	2021 GE_{179}	—	April 10, 2021	Haleakala	Pan-STARRS 1	·	1.4 km	MPC · JPL
847049	2021 GY_{180}	—	September 10, 2018	Mount Lemmon	Mount Lemmon Survey	·	1.3 km	MPC · JPL
847050	2021 GQ_{187}	—	December 6, 2015	Mount Lemmon	Mount Lemmon Survey	·	790 m	MPC · JPL
847051	2021 GQ_{222}	—	April 9, 2021	Haleakala	Pan-STARRS 1	·	800 m	MPC · JPL
847052	2021 HG_{5}	—	August 19, 2006	Kitt Peak	Spacewatch	NYS	830 m	MPC · JPL
847053	2021 HQ_{5}	—	February 2, 2006	Kitt Peak	Spacewatch	·	710 m	MPC · JPL
847054	2021 HM_{11}	—	October 20, 2014	Mount Lemmon	Mount Lemmon Survey	·	780 m	MPC · JPL
847055	2021 HE_{16}	—	April 17, 2021	Haleakala	Pan-STARRS 1	·	2.1 km	MPC · JPL
847056	2021 HW_{23}	—	October 22, 2009	Mount Lemmon	Mount Lemmon Survey	HOF	1.7 km	MPC · JPL
847057	2021 HL_{33}	—	April 15, 2021	MAP, San Pedro de	A. Maury, Attard, G.	·	1.3 km	MPC · JPL
847058	2021 JR_{19}	—	August 12, 2018	Haleakala	Pan-STARRS 1	·	1.6 km	MPC · JPL
847059	2021 JA_{25}	—	May 9, 2021	Haleakala	Pan-STARRS 1	·	880 m	MPC · JPL
847060	2021 JC_{28}	—	May 12, 2021	Haleakala	Pan-STARRS 1	L5	6.9 km	MPC · JPL
847061	2021 JP_{29}	—	January 25, 2020	Mount Lemmon	Mount Lemmon Survey	·	2.8 km	MPC · JPL
847062	2021 JM_{61}	—	January 24, 2020	Mount Lemmon	Mount Lemmon Survey	·	1.3 km	MPC · JPL
847063	2021 JT_{66}	—	May 8, 2021	Haleakala	Pan-STARRS 1	PHO	670 m	MPC · JPL
847064	2021 KM_{5}	—	March 10, 2016	Mount Lemmon	Mount Lemmon Survey	·	1.1 km	MPC · JPL
847065	2021 LY_{6}	—	February 11, 2010	WISE	WISE	·	2.4 km	MPC · JPL
847066	2021 LE_{10}	—	September 29, 2008	Mount Lemmon	Mount Lemmon Survey	·	1.5 km	MPC · JPL
847067	2021 LX_{14}	—	September 21, 2017	Haleakala	Pan-STARRS 1	·	1.2 km	MPC · JPL
847068	2021 LS_{19}	—	June 3, 2021	Haleakala	Pan-STARRS 1	·	780 m	MPC · JPL
847069	2021 LA_{22}	—	September 19, 2011	Haleakala	Pan-STARRS 1	·	1.5 km	MPC · JPL
847070	2021 LT_{25}	—	January 19, 2015	Haleakala	Pan-STARRS 1	·	1.1 km	MPC · JPL
847071	2021 LN_{26}	—	June 13, 2021	Haleakala	Pan-STARRS 1	EUN	770 m	MPC · JPL
847072	2021 LU_{29}	—	May 1, 2016	Cerro Tololo	DECam	·	780 m	MPC · JPL
847073	2021 LH_{32}	—	March 29, 2016	Cerro Tololo-DECam	DECam	·	770 m	MPC · JPL
847074	2021 LY_{33}	—	June 6, 2021	Mount Lemmon	Mount Lemmon Survey	·	1.4 km	MPC · JPL
847075	2021 LF_{35}	—	August 2, 2013	Haleakala	Pan-STARRS 1	·	900 m	MPC · JPL
847076	2021 LP_{35}	—	March 27, 2016	Cerro Tololo	DECam	·	890 m	MPC · JPL
847077	2021 LN_{36}	—	September 10, 2013	Haleakala	Pan-STARRS 1	H	400 m	MPC · JPL
847078	2021 LR_{36}	—	June 13, 2021	Haleakala	Pan-STARRS 1	·	1.0 km	MPC · JPL
847079	2021 ME_{2}	—	November 19, 2017	Haleakala	Pan-STARRS 1	·	1.9 km	MPC · JPL
847080	2021 MP_{2}	—	June 16, 2021	Haleakala	Pan-STARRS 1	·	1.4 km	MPC · JPL
847081	2021 MM_{3}	—	May 27, 2017	Haleakala	Pan-STARRS 1	·	750 m	MPC · JPL
847082	2021 MJ_{4}	—	April 23, 2014	Cerro Tololo	DECam	·	2.1 km	MPC · JPL
847083	2021 MO_{4}	—	June 18, 2021	Haleakala	Pan-STARRS 1	AGN	790 m	MPC · JPL
847084	2021 MJ_{7}	—	June 19, 2021	Haleakala	Pan-STARRS 1	·	1.1 km	MPC · JPL
847085	2021 MC_{12}	—	June 20, 2021	Haleakala	Pan-STARRS 1	·	1.0 km	MPC · JPL
847086	2021 NL_{9}	—	March 30, 2008	Kitt Peak	Spacewatch	·	770 m	MPC · JPL
847087	2021 NR_{10}	—	September 15, 2009	Kitt Peak	Spacewatch	·	740 m	MPC · JPL
847088	2021 NF_{12}	—	July 9, 2021	Mount Lemmon	Mount Lemmon Survey	HNS	830 m	MPC · JPL
847089	2021 NH_{39}	—	July 7, 2021	Haleakala	Pan-STARRS 1	·	1.1 km	MPC · JPL
847090	2021 NJ_{44}	—	July 7, 2021	Haleakala	Pan-STARRS 1	·	1.3 km	MPC · JPL
847091	2021 NG_{45}	—	July 8, 2021	Haleakala	Pan-STARRS 1	(194)	1.4 km	MPC · JPL
847092	2021 NE_{51}	—	July 11, 2021	Haleakala	Pan-STARRS 1	·	1.5 km	MPC · JPL
847093	2021 NQ_{52}	—	July 9, 2021	Haleakala	Pan-STARRS 1	·	970 m	MPC · JPL
847094	2021 NS_{55}	—	July 7, 2021	Haleakala	Pan-STARRS 1	MAR	730 m	MPC · JPL
847095	2021 NS_{57}	—	July 5, 2021	Haleakala	Pan-STARRS 1	AGN	790 m	MPC · JPL
847096	2021 NJ_{58}	—	July 7, 2021	Haleakala	Pan-STARRS 1	·	940 m	MPC · JPL
847097	2021 NM_{65}	—	September 27, 2006	Kitt Peak	Spacewatch	·	1.7 km	MPC · JPL
847098	2021 NW_{70}	—	July 5, 2021	Haleakala	Pan-STARRS 1	·	1.4 km	MPC · JPL
847099	2021 OY_{10}	—	July 30, 2017	Haleakala	Pan-STARRS 1	·	800 m	MPC · JPL
847100	2021 OF_{11}	—	July 31, 2021	Haleakala	Pan-STARRS 1	·	1.2 km	MPC · JPL

== 847101–847200 ==
back to top

Designation			Discovery			Properties		Ref
Permanent	Provisional	Named after	Date	Site	Discoverer(s)	Category	Diam.	Ref
847101	2021 OW_{12}	—	September 24, 2017	Haleakala	Pan-STARRS 1	(5)	630 m	MPC · JPL
847102	2021 OD_{13}	—	August 13, 2012	Haleakala	Pan-STARRS 1	·	1.1 km	MPC · JPL
847103	2021 OZ_{15}	—	July 16, 2021	Haleakala	Pan-STARRS 1	·	820 m	MPC · JPL
847104	2021 OA_{18}	—	August 31, 2017	Mount Lemmon	Mount Lemmon Survey	KON	1.4 km	MPC · JPL
847105	2021 OP_{30}	—	April 23, 2014	Cerro Tololo-DECam	DECam	·	1.9 km	MPC · JPL
847106	2021 PA_{4}	—	January 17, 2016	Haleakala	Pan-STARRS 1	·	450 m	MPC · JPL
847107	2021 PM_{9}	—	September 26, 2016	Haleakala	Pan-STARRS 1	·	1.2 km	MPC · JPL
847108	2021 PU_{19}	—	March 6, 2016	Haleakala	Pan-STARRS 1	·	790 m	MPC · JPL
847109	2021 PU_{23}	—	August 7, 2021	Haleakala	Pan-STARRS 1	centaur	60 km	MPC · JPL
847110	2021 PK_{31}	—	September 14, 2017	Haleakala	Pan-STARRS 1	·	1.0 km	MPC · JPL
847111	2021 PY_{32}	—	July 5, 2017	Haleakala	Pan-STARRS 1	·	780 m	MPC · JPL
847112	2021 PU_{40}	—	August 6, 2021	Haleakala	Pan-STARRS 1	·	850 m	MPC · JPL
847113	2021 PH_{45}	—	December 13, 2009	Mount Lemmon	Mount Lemmon Survey	(5)	630 m	MPC · JPL
847114	2021 PR_{51}	—	September 30, 2017	Haleakala	Pan-STARRS 1	·	980 m	MPC · JPL
847115	2021 PL_{54}	—	August 8, 2016	Haleakala	Pan-STARRS 1	·	1.4 km	MPC · JPL
847116	2021 PV_{57}	—	August 15, 2021	Haleakala	Pan-STARRS 1	·	1.0 km	MPC · JPL
847117	2021 PL_{70}	—	August 25, 2004	Kitt Peak	Spacewatch	·	990 m	MPC · JPL
847118	2021 PP_{71}	—	September 18, 2012	Mount Lemmon	Mount Lemmon Survey	·	1.3 km	MPC · JPL
847119	2021 PB_{84}	—	October 18, 2009	Mount Lemmon	Mount Lemmon Survey	·	910 m	MPC · JPL
847120	2021 PT_{85}	—	October 30, 2008	Mount Lemmon	Mount Lemmon Survey	·	1.3 km	MPC · JPL
847121	2021 PD_{95}	—	December 15, 2017	Mount Lemmon	Mount Lemmon Survey	·	1.1 km	MPC · JPL
847122	2021 PL_{99}	—	August 7, 2021	Haleakala	Pan-STARRS 1	EUN	830 m	MPC · JPL
847123	2021 PA_{107}	—	August 7, 2021	Haleakala	Pan-STARRS 1	·	1.1 km	MPC · JPL
847124	2021 PU_{113}	—	October 12, 2017	Mount Lemmon	Mount Lemmon Survey	·	980 m	MPC · JPL
847125	2021 PX_{117}	—	August 7, 2021	Haleakala	Pan-STARRS 1	JUN	780 m	MPC · JPL
847126	2021 PP_{126}	—	August 10, 2021	Haleakala	Pan-STARRS 1	·	1.2 km	MPC · JPL
847127	2021 PN_{168}	—	April 23, 2014	Cerro Tololo	DECam	·	1.2 km	MPC · JPL
847128	2021 PO_{211}	—	September 22, 2016	Mount Lemmon	Mount Lemmon Survey	·	2.0 km	MPC · JPL
847129	2021 PU_{224}	—	August 4, 2021	Haleakala	Pan-STARRS 1	·	1.7 km	MPC · JPL
847130	2021 QB_{1}	—	June 24, 2015	Mount Lemmon	Mount Lemmon Survey	·	3.4 km	MPC · JPL
847131	2021 QT_{6}	—	April 29, 2014	Cerro Tololo	DECam	·	2.2 km	MPC · JPL
847132	2021 QE_{10}	—	March 16, 2016	Haleakala	Pan-STARRS 1	·	1.1 km	MPC · JPL
847133	2021 QP_{16}	—	August 20, 2021	Haleakala	Pan-STARRS 1	·	1.4 km	MPC · JPL
847134	2021 QM_{34}	—	December 12, 2004	Kitt Peak	Spacewatch	·	1.5 km	MPC · JPL
847135	2021 QV_{39}	—	April 19, 2020	Haleakala	Pan-STARRS 1	·	1.0 km	MPC · JPL
847136	2021 QJ_{45}	—	August 17, 2021	Haleakala	Pan-STARRS 1	DOR	1.8 km	MPC · JPL
847137	2021 QH_{47}	—	November 28, 2013	Mount Lemmon	Mount Lemmon Survey	·	1.1 km	MPC · JPL
847138	2021 QZ_{51}	—	August 30, 2021	Haleakala	Pan-STARRS 1	·	1.5 km	MPC · JPL
847139	2021 QZ_{62}	—	October 26, 2013	Mount Lemmon	Mount Lemmon Survey	·	1.0 km	MPC · JPL
847140	2021 QT_{64}	—	August 18, 2021	Haleakala	Pan-STARRS 1	·	1.1 km	MPC · JPL
847141	2021 QL_{66}	—	April 18, 2015	Cerro Tololo	DECam	EUN	830 m	MPC · JPL
847142	2021 QX_{66}	—	February 13, 2002	Sacramento Peak	SDSS	·	1.6 km	MPC · JPL
847143	2021 QT_{81}	—	August 17, 2021	Haleakala	Pan-STARRS 1	·	1.6 km	MPC · JPL
847144	2021 QO_{114}	—	August 17, 2021	Haleakala	Pan-STARRS 1	·	1.8 km	MPC · JPL
847145	2021 RU_{6}	—	September 3, 2021	Haleakala	Pan-STARRS 1	H	360 m	MPC · JPL
847146	2021 RG_{10}	—	October 10, 2010	Črni Vrh	Mikuž, B.	·	2.3 km	MPC · JPL
847147	2021 RP_{11}	—	October 6, 2012	Haleakala	Pan-STARRS 1	·	1.3 km	MPC · JPL
847148	2021 RR_{13}	—	September 25, 2012	Mount Lemmon	Mount Lemmon Survey	·	1.2 km	MPC · JPL
847149	2021 RU_{22}	—	June 29, 2016	Haleakala	Pan-STARRS 1	EUN	770 m	MPC · JPL
847150	2021 RB_{23}	—	June 29, 2015	Haleakala	Pan-STARRS 1	·	2.6 km	MPC · JPL
847151	2021 RV_{24}	—	September 3, 2021	Mount Lemmon	Mount Lemmon Survey	·	1.2 km	MPC · JPL
847152	2021 RS_{25}	—	September 4, 2021	Haleakala	Pan-STARRS 1	·	960 m	MPC · JPL
847153	2021 RO_{30}	—	September 4, 2021	Haleakala	Pan-STARRS 1	·	1.1 km	MPC · JPL
847154	2021 RZ_{32}	—	June 7, 2016	Haleakala	Pan-STARRS 1	·	1.4 km	MPC · JPL
847155	2021 RL_{37}	—	October 30, 2008	Catalina	CSS	·	1.2 km	MPC · JPL
847156	2021 RK_{40}	—	September 23, 2017	Haleakala	Pan-STARRS 1	·	980 m	MPC · JPL
847157	2021 RZ_{40}	—	September 8, 2021	Haleakala	Pan-STARRS 1	·	1.3 km	MPC · JPL
847158	2021 RU_{43}	—	October 25, 2008	Kitt Peak	Spacewatch	·	1.1 km	MPC · JPL
847159	2021 RA_{45}	—	August 8, 2016	Haleakala	Pan-STARRS 1	·	1.5 km	MPC · JPL
847160	2021 RJ_{63}	—	September 7, 2021	Haleakala	Pan-STARRS 2	·	1.5 km	MPC · JPL
847161	2021 RX_{66}	—	September 25, 2012	Mount Lemmon	Mount Lemmon Survey	·	1.3 km	MPC · JPL
847162	2021 RC_{70}	—	September 4, 2021	Haleakala	Pan-STARRS 1	·	1.7 km	MPC · JPL
847163	2021 RP_{74}	—	September 21, 2012	Catalina	CSS	·	1.2 km	MPC · JPL
847164	2021 RF_{75}	—	October 22, 2012	Haleakala	Pan-STARRS 1	HOF	1.6 km	MPC · JPL
847165	2021 RN_{76}	—	September 4, 2021	Haleakala	Pan-STARRS 1	·	2.1 km	MPC · JPL
847166	2021 RP_{82}	—	October 8, 2008	Mount Lemmon	Mount Lemmon Survey	·	910 m	MPC · JPL
847167	2021 RR_{84}	—	September 10, 2021	Haleakala	Pan-STARRS 1	·	1.1 km	MPC · JPL
847168	2021 RT_{84}	—	May 9, 2007	Mount Lemmon	Mount Lemmon Survey	·	1.0 km	MPC · JPL
847169	2021 RH_{90}	—	July 30, 2008	Mount Lemmon	Mount Lemmon Survey	·	940 m	MPC · JPL
847170	2021 RJ_{96}	—	September 3, 2021	Haleakala	Pan-STARRS 1	·	1.1 km	MPC · JPL
847171	2021 RZ_{99}	—	August 5, 2017	Haleakala	Pan-STARRS 1	·	1.0 km	MPC · JPL
847172	2021 RN_{101}	—	September 21, 2012	Mount Lemmon	Mount Lemmon Survey	·	1.1 km	MPC · JPL
847173	2021 RP_{102}	—	October 10, 2008	Mount Lemmon	Mount Lemmon Survey	·	1.3 km	MPC · JPL
847174	2021 RY_{104}	—	October 6, 2008	Mount Lemmon	Mount Lemmon Survey	EUN	920 m	MPC · JPL
847175	2021 RF_{107}	—	September 4, 2021	Haleakala	Pan-STARRS 1	AGN	810 m	MPC · JPL
847176	2021 RK_{107}	—	September 4, 2021	Haleakala	Pan-STARRS 1	·	1.2 km	MPC · JPL
847177	2021 RY_{115}	—	September 4, 2021	Haleakala	Pan-STARRS 1	HOF	2.0 km	MPC · JPL
847178	2021 RZ_{117}	—	September 21, 2012	Mount Lemmon	Mount Lemmon Survey	·	1.1 km	MPC · JPL
847179	2021 RY_{121}	—	September 15, 2012	Kitt Peak	Spacewatch	·	1.1 km	MPC · JPL
847180	2021 RG_{123}	—	November 21, 1995	Kitt Peak	Spacewatch	·	1.2 km	MPC · JPL
847181	2021 RR_{125}	—	May 20, 2015	Cerro Tololo	DECam	·	1.0 km	MPC · JPL
847182	2021 RS_{125}	—	May 20, 2015	Cerro Tololo	DECam	·	1.3 km	MPC · JPL
847183	2021 RZ_{132}	—	October 29, 2011	Kitt Peak	Spacewatch	·	400 m	MPC · JPL
847184	2021 RC_{133}	—	September 8, 2008	Kitt Peak	Spacewatch	EUN	810 m	MPC · JPL
847185	2021 RX_{134}	—	May 20, 2015	Cerro Tololo	DECam	·	1.4 km	MPC · JPL
847186	2021 RD_{135}	—	September 10, 2021	Haleakala	Pan-STARRS 1	·	1.3 km	MPC · JPL
847187	2021 RK_{140}	—	October 2, 2010	Mount Lemmon	Mount Lemmon Survey	·	780 m	MPC · JPL
847188	2021 RT_{146}	—	August 1, 2016	Haleakala	Pan-STARRS 1	·	1.4 km	MPC · JPL
847189	2021 RX_{154}	—	September 5, 2021	Haleakala	Pan-STARRS 2	·	1.6 km	MPC · JPL
847190	2021 RS_{158}	—	September 5, 2021	Haleakala	Pan-STARRS 2	·	1.1 km	MPC · JPL
847191	2021 RE_{160}	—	September 8, 2021	Haleakala	Pan-STARRS 2	·	1.4 km	MPC · JPL
847192	2021 RW_{167}	—	September 8, 2021	Haleakala	Pan-STARRS 2	·	1.0 km	MPC · JPL
847193	2021 RO_{177}	—	October 6, 2016	Haleakala	Pan-STARRS 1	·	1.5 km	MPC · JPL
847194	2021 RQ_{177}	—	August 3, 2000	Kitt Peak	Spacewatch	·	870 m	MPC · JPL
847195	2021 RA_{184}	—	September 5, 2021	Haleakala	Pan-STARRS 2	GEF	960 m	MPC · JPL
847196	2021 RU_{184}	—	September 10, 2021	Haleakala	Pan-STARRS 1	·	1.5 km	MPC · JPL
847197	2021 RS_{200}	—	September 10, 2021	Haleakala	Pan-STARRS 1	AGN	800 m	MPC · JPL
847198	2021 RU_{208}	—	September 8, 2021	Haleakala	Pan-STARRS 2	·	1.2 km	MPC · JPL
847199	2021 SX_{6}	—	August 27, 2016	Haleakala	Pan-STARRS 1	HOF	1.9 km	MPC · JPL
847200	2021 SK_{11}	—	August 28, 2016	Mount Lemmon	Mount Lemmon Survey	·	1.4 km	MPC · JPL

== 847201–847300 ==
back to top

Designation			Discovery			Properties		Ref
Permanent	Provisional	Named after	Date	Site	Discoverer(s)	Category	Diam.	Ref
847201	2021 ST_{14}	—	June 8, 2008	Kitt Peak	Spacewatch	·	670 m	MPC · JPL
847202	2021 SM_{21}	—	October 30, 2008	Mount Lemmon	Mount Lemmon Survey	·	1.1 km	MPC · JPL
847203	2021 SH_{25}	—	August 27, 2005	Kitt Peak	Spacewatch	·	1.3 km	MPC · JPL
847204	2021 SN_{30}	—	November 12, 2012	Mount Lemmon	Mount Lemmon Survey	615	970 m	MPC · JPL
847205	2021 SJ_{32}	—	May 22, 2015	Haleakala	Pan-STARRS 1	·	1.3 km	MPC · JPL
847206	2021 SG_{38}	—	May 25, 2015	Mount Lemmon	Mount Lemmon Survey	·	1.4 km	MPC · JPL
847207	2021 SY_{42}	—	January 24, 2014	Haleakala	Pan-STARRS 1	·	1.2 km	MPC · JPL
847208	2021 SR_{44}	—	September 29, 2021	Haleakala	Pan-STARRS 2	·	1.4 km	MPC · JPL
847209	2021 SK_{52}	—	September 30, 2021	Haleakala	Pan-STARRS 2	EOS	1.6 km	MPC · JPL
847210	2021 SC_{54}	—	September 29, 2021	Haleakala	Pan-STARRS 2	L4	6.1 km	MPC · JPL
847211	2021 SH_{56}	—	May 20, 2015	Cerro Tololo	DECam	·	1.4 km	MPC · JPL
847212	2021 TR_{2}	—	November 13, 2017	Haleakala	Pan-STARRS 1	·	1.2 km	MPC · JPL
847213	2021 TJ_{11}	—	October 1, 2008	Kitt Peak	Spacewatch	·	1.2 km	MPC · JPL
847214	2021 TF_{15}	—	November 1, 2010	Mount Lemmon	Mount Lemmon Survey	H	370 m	MPC · JPL
847215	2021 TZ_{20}	—	October 8, 2012	Haleakala	Pan-STARRS 1	·	1.3 km	MPC · JPL
847216	2021 TL_{21}	—	May 21, 2015	Haleakala	Pan-STARRS 1	·	1.2 km	MPC · JPL
847217	2021 TA_{22}	—	October 28, 2008	Mount Lemmon	Mount Lemmon Survey	·	1.0 km	MPC · JPL
847218	2021 TU_{25}	—	March 3, 2014	Cerro Tololo	High Cadence Transient Survey	·	1.8 km	MPC · JPL
847219	2021 TB_{26}	—	October 4, 2021	Haleakala	Pan-STARRS 2	·	1.2 km	MPC · JPL
847220	2021 TE_{27}	—	July 1, 2014	Haleakala	Pan-STARRS 1	·	2.0 km	MPC · JPL
847221	2021 TB_{35}	—	August 26, 2012	Haleakala	Pan-STARRS 1	·	1.1 km	MPC · JPL
847222	2021 TD_{45}	—	May 24, 2015	Haleakala	Pan-STARRS 1	·	1.4 km	MPC · JPL
847223	2021 TD_{52}	—	July 14, 2016	Mount Lemmon	Mount Lemmon Survey	·	1.1 km	MPC · JPL
847224	2021 TT_{54}	—	December 31, 2013	Haleakala	Pan-STARRS 1	·	600 m	MPC · JPL
847225	2021 TS_{57}	—	September 25, 2016	Mount Lemmon	Mount Lemmon Survey	·	1.3 km	MPC · JPL
847226	2021 TT_{58}	—	March 29, 2019	Mount Lemmon	Mount Lemmon Survey	KOR	950 m	MPC · JPL
847227	2021 TQ_{60}	—	October 14, 2021	Mount Lemmon	Mount Lemmon Survey	·	1.4 km	MPC · JPL
847228	2021 TE_{62}	—	September 12, 2016	Haleakala	Pan-STARRS 1	·	1.6 km	MPC · JPL
847229	2021 TY_{70}	—	August 14, 2016	Haleakala	Pan-STARRS 1	WIT	780 m	MPC · JPL
847230	2021 TS_{76}	—	October 29, 2003	Kitt Peak	Spacewatch	·	640 m	MPC · JPL
847231	2021 TQ_{80}	—	October 30, 2008	Kitt Peak	Spacewatch	·	1.1 km	MPC · JPL
847232	2021 TW_{80}	—	September 6, 2016	Mount Lemmon	Mount Lemmon Survey	·	1.6 km	MPC · JPL
847233	2021 TO_{84}	—	September 27, 2016	Haleakala	Pan-STARRS 1	BRA	1.1 km	MPC · JPL
847234	2021 TA_{87}	—	July 7, 2016	Haleakala	Pan-STARRS 1	·	990 m	MPC · JPL
847235	2021 TU_{101}	—	September 17, 2010	Kitt Peak	Spacewatch	·	2.0 km	MPC · JPL
847236	2021 TV_{101}	—	July 2, 2017	Cerro Tololo-DECam	DECam	L4	6.2 km	MPC · JPL
847237	2021 TU_{108}	—	October 2, 2021	Haleakala	Pan-STARRS 2	HOF	1.8 km	MPC · JPL
847238	2021 TY_{136}	—	March 2, 2011	Mount Lemmon	Mount Lemmon Survey	·	1.1 km	MPC · JPL
847239	2021 TK_{137}	—	March 7, 2018	Haleakala	Pan-STARRS 1	·	2.3 km	MPC · JPL
847240	2021 TT_{143}	—	October 2, 2021	Haleakala	Pan-STARRS 2	L4 · ERY	6.4 km	MPC · JPL
847241	2021 TW_{166}	—	July 6, 2019	Haleakala	Pan-STARRS 1	L4	6.7 km	MPC · JPL
847242	2021 UD_{8}	—	April 16, 2001	Anderson Mesa	LONEOS	·	340 m	MPC · JPL
847243	2021 UE_{33}	—	October 4, 2016	Mount Lemmon	Mount Lemmon Survey	·	1.5 km	MPC · JPL
847244	2021 UT_{43}	—	August 14, 2012	Haleakala	Pan-STARRS 1	·	900 m	MPC · JPL
847245	2021 UF_{44}	—	November 30, 2003	Kitt Peak	Spacewatch	·	920 m	MPC · JPL
847246	2021 UP_{47}	—	August 30, 2016	Mount Lemmon	Mount Lemmon Survey	MRX	770 m	MPC · JPL
847247	2021 UV_{49}	—	February 27, 2015	Haleakala	Pan-STARRS 1	·	1.0 km	MPC · JPL
847248	2021 UF_{50}	—	October 28, 2021	Haleakala	Pan-STARRS 2	·	480 m	MPC · JPL
847249	2021 UF_{52}	—	October 27, 2021	Kitt Peak	Bok NEO Survey	·	1.8 km	MPC · JPL
847250	2021 UF_{67}	—	December 24, 2016	Mount Lemmon	Mount Lemmon Survey	EOS	1.3 km	MPC · JPL
847251	2021 UF_{82}	—	November 7, 2016	Mount Lemmon	Mount Lemmon Survey	·	1.2 km	MPC · JPL
847252	2021 UA_{88}	—	May 19, 2015	Cerro Tololo	DECam	NEM	1.3 km	MPC · JPL
847253	2021 UH_{90}	—	October 31, 2021	Haleakala	Pan-STARRS 2	·	2.2 km	MPC · JPL
847254	2021 UP_{90}	—	March 28, 2014	Mount Lemmon	Mount Lemmon Survey	L4	5.7 km	MPC · JPL
847255	2021 UY_{99}	—	October 28, 2021	Mount Lemmon	Mount Lemmon Survey	·	1.5 km	MPC · JPL
847256	2021 UA_{106}	—	December 23, 2017	Haleakala	Pan-STARRS 1	KOR	930 m	MPC · JPL
847257	2021 UM_{125}	—	October 31, 2021	Haleakala	Pan-STARRS 1	·	1.2 km	MPC · JPL
847258	2021 US_{125}	—	October 31, 2021	Haleakala	Pan-STARRS 1	·	1.8 km	MPC · JPL
847259	2021 UH_{127}	—	April 30, 2016	Mount Lemmon	Mount Lemmon Survey	·	1.0 km	MPC · JPL
847260	2021 VS_{7}	—	November 4, 2021	Mount Lemmon	Mount Lemmon Survey	AMO	550 m	MPC · JPL
847261	2021 VZ_{7}	—	August 5, 2018	Haleakala	Pan-STARRS 1	L4 · ERY	6.1 km	MPC · JPL
847262	2021 VR_{18}	—	January 16, 2018	Haleakala	Pan-STARRS 1	·	1.4 km	MPC · JPL
847263	2021 VS_{19}	—	March 16, 2012	Haleakala	Pan-STARRS 1	·	2.1 km	MPC · JPL
847264	2021 VV_{29}	—	November 1, 2021	Haleakala	Pan-STARRS 1	L4	5.1 km	MPC · JPL
847265	2021 VD_{33}	—	November 27, 2006	Mount Lemmon	Mount Lemmon Survey	·	1.4 km	MPC · JPL
847266	2021 VT_{43}	—	September 11, 2015	Haleakala	Pan-STARRS 1	EOS	1.2 km	MPC · JPL
847267	2021 VX_{43}	—	November 11, 2021	Haleakala	Pan-STARRS 1	VER	1.7 km	MPC · JPL
847268	2021 VF_{49}	—	November 9, 2021	Mount Lemmon	Mount Lemmon Survey	EOS	1.3 km	MPC · JPL
847269	2021 VL_{59}	—	July 14, 2015	Haleakala	Pan-STARRS 1	·	1.7 km	MPC · JPL
847270	2021 VR_{63}	—	November 11, 2021	Haleakala	Pan-STARRS 2	·	2.2 km	MPC · JPL
847271	2021 VN_{64}	—	September 21, 2011	Mount Lemmon	Mount Lemmon Survey	·	1.5 km	MPC · JPL
847272	2021 VE_{74}	—	November 7, 2021	Mount Lemmon	Mount Lemmon Survey	·	2.2 km	MPC · JPL
847273	2021 VA_{77}	—	December 29, 2017	Haleakala	Pan-STARRS 1	·	1.7 km	MPC · JPL
847274	2021 WH_{5}	—	March 22, 2015	Haleakala	Pan-STARRS 1	·	1.3 km	MPC · JPL
847275	2021 WO_{10}	—	November 26, 2021	Haleakala	Pan-STARRS 1	EOS	1.3 km	MPC · JPL
847276	2021 WY_{10}	—	November 28, 2021	Haleakala	Pan-STARRS 1	EOS	1.3 km	MPC · JPL
847277	2022 AA_{9}	—	October 5, 2013	Kitt Peak	Spacewatch	NYS	920 m	MPC · JPL
847278	2022 AX_{15}	—	June 24, 2015	Haleakala	Pan-STARRS 1	·	2.1 km	MPC · JPL
847279	2022 AV_{20}	—	April 18, 2015	Cerro Tololo	DECam	·	930 m	MPC · JPL
847280	2022 AD_{34}	—	October 13, 2016	Haleakala	Pan-STARRS 1	BRA	930 m	MPC · JPL
847281	2022 BA_{34}	—	January 28, 2022	Haleakala	Pan-STARRS 2	·	1.3 km	MPC · JPL
847282	2022 CG_{10}	—	February 9, 2022	Haleakala	Pan-STARRS 2	H	340 m	MPC · JPL
847283	2022 CK_{15}	—	March 18, 2018	Haleakala	Pan-STARRS 1	·	930 m	MPC · JPL
847284	2022 CE_{20}	—	February 11, 2022	Haleakala	Pan-STARRS 2	·	1.3 km	MPC · JPL
847285	2022 CN_{28}	—	February 3, 2016	Haleakala	Pan-STARRS 1	·	2.4 km	MPC · JPL
847286	2022 CQ_{39}	—	February 3, 2022	Haleakala	Pan-STARRS 2	·	1.5 km	MPC · JPL
847287	2022 FL_{6}	—	March 11, 2008	Kitt Peak	Spacewatch	·	550 m	MPC · JPL
847288	2022 FC_{7}	—	January 22, 2015	Haleakala	Pan-STARRS 1	·	490 m	MPC · JPL
847289	2022 GT_{8}	—	April 3, 2022	Haleakala	Pan-STARRS 2	TIR	2.2 km	MPC · JPL
847290	2022 GV_{10}	—	April 12, 2022	Haleakala	Pan-STARRS 2	·	1.6 km	MPC · JPL
847291	2022 GW_{19}	—	October 23, 2012	Mount Lemmon	Mount Lemmon Survey	·	2.5 km	MPC · JPL
847292	2022 GC_{23}	—	April 6, 2022	Haleakala	Pan-STARRS 2	V	520 m	MPC · JPL
847293	2022 GC_{25}	—	April 9, 2022	Haleakala	Pan-STARRS 2	·	1.9 km	MPC · JPL
847294	2022 HQ_{5}	—	October 26, 2013	Mount Lemmon	Mount Lemmon Survey	·	2.1 km	MPC · JPL
847295	2022 HE_{6}	—	May 12, 2011	Mount Lemmon	Mount Lemmon Survey	·	2.1 km	MPC · JPL
847296	2022 HS_{7}	—	June 7, 2010	WISE	WISE	LIX	2.7 km	MPC · JPL
847297	2022 HO_{10}	—	April 26, 2022	Haleakala	Pan-STARRS 2	·	2.2 km	MPC · JPL
847298	2022 JS_{4}	—	October 3, 2014	Kitt Peak	Spacewatch	·	1.3 km	MPC · JPL
847299	2022 KQ_{16}	—	April 26, 2010	WISE	WISE	·	2.2 km	MPC · JPL
847300	2022 KC_{29}	—	May 21, 2022	Haleakala	Pan-STARRS 2	·	1.9 km	MPC · JPL

== 847301–847400 ==
back to top

Designation			Discovery			Properties		Ref
Permanent	Provisional	Named after	Date	Site	Discoverer(s)	Category	Diam.	Ref
847301	2022 KV_{41}	—	May 21, 2022	Haleakala	Pan-STARRS 2	·	810 m	MPC · JPL
847302	2022 LQ_{2}	—	January 11, 2019	Haleakala	Pan-STARRS 1	H	360 m	MPC · JPL
847303	2022 NS_{2}	—	July 4, 2022	Haleakala	Pan-STARRS 2	·	990 m	MPC · JPL
847304	2022 OP	—	July 21, 2022	Haleakala	Pan-STARRS 2	AMO	490 m	MPC · JPL
847305	2022 OV_{6}	—	September 9, 2015	Haleakala	Pan-STARRS 1	·	720 m	MPC · JPL
847306	2022 OO_{54}	—	November 22, 2014	Haleakala	Pan-STARRS 1	L5	7.4 km	MPC · JPL
847307	2022 PA_{6}	—	October 4, 2006	Mount Lemmon	Mount Lemmon Survey	·	1.8 km	MPC · JPL
847308	2022 PV_{14}	—	August 2, 2022	Haleakala	Pan-STARRS 2	·	2.2 km	MPC · JPL
847309	2022 PG_{22}	—	August 6, 2022	Haleakala	Pan-STARRS 2	L5	7.2 km	MPC · JPL
847310	2022 QB_{107}	—	December 17, 2018	Haleakala	Pan-STARRS 1	·	1.4 km	MPC · JPL
847311	2022 QD_{123}	—	August 25, 2022	Haleakala	Pan-STARRS 1	·	2.3 km	MPC · JPL
847312	2022 QS_{145}	—	December 23, 2012	Haleakala	Pan-STARRS 1	VER	2.1 km	MPC · JPL
847313	2022 QK_{147}	—	April 4, 2016	Mount Lemmon	Mount Lemmon Survey	·	1.3 km	MPC · JPL
847314	2022 QS_{174}	—	October 10, 2008	Mount Lemmon	Mount Lemmon Survey	·	1.4 km	MPC · JPL
847315	2022 QZ_{189}	—	August 20, 2022	Haleakala	Pan-STARRS 1	L5	7.6 km	MPC · JPL
847316	2022 QD_{194}	—	August 27, 2022	Haleakala	Pan-STARRS 2	V	460 m	MPC · JPL
847317	2022 QQ_{261}	—	January 16, 2015	Haleakala	Pan-STARRS 1	L5	7.1 km	MPC · JPL
847318	2022 RG_{72}	—	November 28, 2014	Haleakala	Pan-STARRS 1	MAR	750 m	MPC · JPL
847319	2022 SL_{44}	—	October 5, 2018	Mount Lemmon	Mount Lemmon Survey	·	940 m	MPC · JPL
847320	2022 SB_{57}	—	September 20, 2009	Mount Lemmon	Mount Lemmon Survey	·	530 m	MPC · JPL
847321	2022 SK_{58}	—	November 22, 2005	Kitt Peak	Spacewatch	·	1.1 km	MPC · JPL
847322	2022 SQ_{71}	—	October 3, 2013	Mount Lemmon	Mount Lemmon Survey	·	1.5 km	MPC · JPL
847323	2022 SZ_{89}	—	September 17, 2009	Kitt Peak	Spacewatch	·	1.2 km	MPC · JPL
847324	2022 SF_{104}	—	January 27, 2020	Haleakala	Pan-STARRS 1	V	430 m	MPC · JPL
847325	2022 SM_{153}	—	October 22, 2014	Mount Lemmon	Mount Lemmon Survey	·	860 m	MPC · JPL
847326	2022 SR_{203}	—	November 27, 2014	Haleakala	Pan-STARRS 1	·	1.3 km	MPC · JPL
847327	2022 SZ_{208}	—	December 30, 2019	Kitt Peak	Bok NEO Survey	·	490 m	MPC · JPL
847328	2022 TV_{2}	—	October 15, 2022	PASTIS	C. Demeautis	AMO	280 m	MPC · JPL
847329	2022 TH_{5}	—	October 22, 2009	Mount Lemmon	Mount Lemmon Survey	·	1.4 km	MPC · JPL
847330	2022 TD_{21}	—	October 4, 2022	Haleakala	Pan-STARRS 2	JUN	720 m	MPC · JPL
847331	2022 TH_{36}	—	October 1, 2022	Haleakala	Pan-STARRS 2	HNS	810 m	MPC · JPL
847332	2022 TM_{55}	—	October 6, 2022	Haleakala	Pan-STARRS 2	·	1.3 km	MPC · JPL
847333	2022 UM_{37}	—	April 22, 2009	Mount Lemmon	Mount Lemmon Survey	EOS	1.3 km	MPC · JPL
847334	2022 UT_{41}	—	December 8, 2017	Mount Lemmon	Mount Lemmon Survey	·	2.9 km	MPC · JPL
847335	2022 UZ_{84}	—	June 15, 2005	Mount Lemmon	Mount Lemmon Survey	·	860 m	MPC · JPL
847336	2022 UO_{85}	—	August 28, 2016	Mount Lemmon	Mount Lemmon Survey	EOS	1.1 km	MPC · JPL
847337	2022 UD_{106}	—	November 19, 2016	Mount Lemmon	Mount Lemmon Survey	·	2.8 km	MPC · JPL
847338	2022 UH_{172}	—	October 20, 2022	Haleakala	Pan-STARRS 2	·	1.7 km	MPC · JPL
847339	2022 WT_{14}	—	January 10, 2007	Mount Lemmon	Mount Lemmon Survey	·	710 m	MPC · JPL
847340	2022 WJ_{17}	—	January 10, 2011	Mount Lemmon	Mount Lemmon Survey	(5)	760 m	MPC · JPL
847341	2022 WL_{33}	—	November 30, 2022	Mount Lemmon	Mount Lemmon Survey	EOS	1.4 km	MPC · JPL
847342	2023 AE_{4}	—	February 16, 2012	Haleakala	Pan-STARRS 1	·	2.0 km	MPC · JPL
847343	2023 AL_{7}	—	February 17, 2015	Haleakala	Pan-STARRS 1	·	930 m	MPC · JPL
847344	2023 CA_{4}	—	February 13, 2023	Mount Lemmon	Mount Lemmon Survey	APO	130 m	MPC · JPL
847345	2023 DF_{3}	—	August 31, 2017	Mount Lemmon	Mount Lemmon Survey	·	610 m	MPC · JPL
847346	2023 FL_{15}	—	March 30, 2008	Kitt Peak	Spacewatch	EOS	1.3 km	MPC · JPL
847347	2023 FH_{21}	—	September 4, 2021	MAP, San Pedro de	A. Maury, Attard, G.	H	470 m	MPC · JPL
847348	2023 GS_{6}	—	April 14, 2023	Haleakala	Pan-STARRS 2	(1547)	1.5 km	MPC · JPL
847349	2023 HU_{7}	—	April 27, 2023	Mount Lemmon	Mount Lemmon Survey	AMO	370 m	MPC · JPL
847350	2023 HE_{12}	—	April 25, 2023	Haleakala	Pan-STARRS 2	·	2.3 km	MPC · JPL
847351	2023 HS_{34}	—	March 27, 2017	Haleakala	Pan-STARRS 1	·	2.3 km	MPC · JPL
847352	2023 MR_{13}	—	June 20, 2023	Haleakala	Pan-STARRS 2	L5 · (291316)	6.7 km	MPC · JPL
847353	2023 OV	—	July 16, 2023	Sutherland	ATLAS	AMO	660 m	MPC · JPL
847354	2023 OF_{9}	—	July 24, 2022	Haleakala	Pan-STARRS 2	L5	7.4 km	MPC · JPL
847355	2023 OW_{11}	—	August 19, 2012	Siding Spring	SSS	·	2.3 km	MPC · JPL
847356	2023 QP_{18}	—	September 12, 2001	Socorro	LINEAR	MAS	520 m	MPC · JPL
847357	2023 RU_{14}	—	August 25, 2012	Kitt Peak	Spacewatch	·	1.7 km	MPC · JPL
847358	2023 RF_{44}	—	November 22, 2014	Mount Lemmon	Mount Lemmon Survey	·	1.6 km	MPC · JPL
847359	2023 SZ_{27}	—	May 15, 2009	Kitt Peak	Spacewatch	·	1.1 km	MPC · JPL
847360	2023 SZ_{50}	—	September 28, 2014	Haleakala	Pan-STARRS 1	·	840 m	MPC · JPL
847361	2023 TD_{21}	—	February 26, 2014	Haleakala	Pan-STARRS 1	CLA	1.2 km	MPC · JPL
847362	2023 TK_{77}	—	September 27, 2006	Kitt Peak	Spacewatch	(5)	940 m	MPC · JPL
847363	2023 TG_{80}	—	October 1, 2013	Mount Lemmon	Mount Lemmon Survey	KOR	980 m	MPC · JPL
847364	2023 VX_{6}	—	November 7, 2023	Mount Lemmon	Mount Lemmon Survey	AMO	480 m	MPC · JPL
847365	2024 BZ_{9}	—	September 17, 2017	Haleakala	Pan-STARRS 1	HOF	1.7 km	MPC · JPL
847366	2024 BR_{14}	—	August 29, 2016	Mount Lemmon	Mount Lemmon Survey	·	1.5 km	MPC · JPL
847367	2024 BD_{19}	—	April 24, 2014	Mount Lemmon	Mount Lemmon Survey	·	1.7 km	MPC · JPL
847368	2024 CL_{12}	—	February 3, 2013	Haleakala	Pan-STARRS 1	EOS	1.2 km	MPC · JPL
847369	2024 GB_{2}	—	October 18, 2007	Mount Lemmon	Mount Lemmon Survey	·	1.4 km	MPC · JPL
847370	2024 GN_{9}	—	August 30, 2014	Kitt Peak	Spacewatch	HYG	1.9 km	MPC · JPL
847371	2024 HA_{6}	—	April 17, 2024	Haleakala	Pan-STARRS 1	·	1.3 km	MPC · JPL
847372	2024 JT_{5}	—	March 28, 2008	Mount Lemmon	Mount Lemmon Survey	·	1.3 km	MPC · JPL
847373	2024 JB_{12}	—	March 14, 2012	Mount Lemmon	Mount Lemmon Survey	THM	1.7 km	MPC · JPL
847374	2024 JZ_{12}	—	November 3, 2015	Mount Lemmon	Mount Lemmon Survey	·	2.0 km	MPC · JPL
847375	2024 JV_{18}	—	October 9, 2012	Haleakala	Pan-STARRS 1	·	1.0 km	MPC · JPL
847376	2024 JT_{47}	—	May 23, 2014	Haleakala	Pan-STARRS 1	·	1.1 km	MPC · JPL
847377	2024 PG_{6}	—	September 24, 2011	Haleakala	Pan-STARRS 1	·	940 m	MPC · JPL
847378	2024 PX_{15}	—	June 18, 2023	Haleakala	Pan-STARRS 1	L5	6.8 km	MPC · JPL
847379	2024 PG_{29}	—	October 20, 2003	Kitt Peak	Spacewatch	·	1.6 km	MPC · JPL
847380	2024 QC_{9}	—	March 10, 2018	Haleakala	Pan-STARRS 1	·	1.0 km	MPC · JPL
847381	2024 RV_{33}	—	October 23, 2015	Mount Lemmon	Mount Lemmon Survey	·	1.3 km	MPC · JPL
847382	2024 RC_{87}	—	October 23, 2013	Haleakala	Pan-STARRS 1	·	1.8 km	MPC · JPL
847383	2024 RM_{204}	—	May 12, 2021	Haleakala	Pan-STARRS 1	L5	5.4 km	MPC · JPL
847384	2024 SV_{12}	—	October 24, 2011	Haleakala	Pan-STARRS 1	·	1.2 km	MPC · JPL
847385	2024 SH_{23}	—	September 19, 2011	Mount Lemmon	Mount Lemmon Survey	·	1.1 km	MPC · JPL
847386	2024 TA_{8}	—	February 5, 2013	Kitt Peak	Spacewatch	·	710 m	MPC · JPL
847387	2024 TF_{14}	—	December 29, 2014	Haleakala	Pan-STARRS 1	·	2.0 km	MPC · JPL
847388	2024 UU_{22}	—	February 17, 2015	Haleakala	Pan-STARRS 1	·	2.5 km	MPC · JPL
847389	2024 UM_{45}	—	August 26, 2012	Haleakala	Pan-STARRS 1	·	2.0 km	MPC · JPL
847390	2024 WP_{10}	—	May 21, 2022	Haleakala	Pan-STARRS 2	·	1.4 km	MPC · JPL
847391	2024 WQ_{31}	—	January 31, 2009	Kitt Peak	Spacewatch	·	1.4 km	MPC · JPL
847392	2024 WS_{44}	—	September 7, 2019	Mount Lemmon	Mount Lemmon Survey	·	1.3 km	MPC · JPL
847393	2024 XH_{8}	—	March 15, 2010	WISE	WISE	·	1.1 km	MPC · JPL
847394	2024 XQ_{21}	—	December 5, 2008	Mount Lemmon	Mount Lemmon Survey	·	780 m	MPC · JPL
847395	2024 XG_{30}	—	September 17, 2006	Kitt Peak	Spacewatch	·	1.0 km	MPC · JPL
847396	2024 XC_{31}	—	November 5, 2019	Mount Lemmon	Mount Lemmon Survey	·	1.2 km	MPC · JPL
847397	2024 YR_{19}	—	March 16, 2020	Mount Lemmon	Mount Lemmon Survey	·	2.2 km	MPC · JPL
847398	2024 YC_{22}	—	December 21, 2014	Haleakala	Pan-STARRS 1	·	1.4 km	MPC · JPL
847399	2024 YH_{27}	—	January 1, 2020	Haleakala	Pan-STARRS 1	·	2.4 km	MPC · JPL
847400	2024 YQ_{31}	—	October 18, 2012	Haleakala	Pan-STARRS 1	·	1.7 km	MPC · JPL

== 847401–847500 ==
back to top

Designation			Discovery			Properties		Ref
Permanent	Provisional	Named after	Date	Site	Discoverer(s)	Category	Diam.	Ref
847401	2024 YR_{33}	—	January 29, 2016	Mount Lemmon	Mount Lemmon Survey	·	1.2 km	MPC · JPL
847402	2024 YQ_{48}	—	January 25, 2009	Kitt Peak	Spacewatch	·	680 m	MPC · JPL
847403	2025 AF_{6}	—	April 5, 2022	Mount Lemmon	Mount Lemmon Survey	·	550 m	MPC · JPL
847404	2025 AO_{7}	—	November 7, 2018	Mount Lemmon	Mount Lemmon Survey	·	1.2 km	MPC · JPL
847405	2025 AQ_{14}	—	August 18, 2022	Haleakala	Pan-STARRS 1	·	2.3 km	MPC · JPL
847406	2025 CK_{14}	—	May 19, 2015	Cerro Tololo	DECam	L4	5.4 km	MPC · JPL
847407	2025 DV_{19}	—	February 11, 2011	Mount Lemmon	Mount Lemmon Survey	·	1.2 km	MPC · JPL
847408	2025 DT_{28}	—	September 28, 2020	Haleakala	Pan-STARRS 1	L4	5.6 km	MPC · JPL
847409	2025 DU_{28}	—	May 9, 2010	Mount Lemmon	Mount Lemmon Survey	3:2	3.9 km	MPC · JPL
847410	2025 DP_{33}	—	January 1, 2012	Mount Lemmon	Mount Lemmon Survey	L4	5.9 km	MPC · JPL
847411	2025 DN_{34}	—	February 28, 2016	Mount Lemmon	Mount Lemmon Survey	·	1.3 km	MPC · JPL
847412	2025 DB_{42}	—	April 10, 2021	Haleakala	Pan-STARRS 1	·	1.1 km	MPC · JPL
847413	2025 FO_{24}	—	March 29, 2008	Mount Lemmon	Mount Lemmon Survey	·	1.9 km	MPC · JPL
847414	2025 HR_{2}	—	January 3, 2019	Haleakala	Pan-STARRS 1	·	1.4 km	MPC · JPL
847415	2025 HJ_{22}	—	August 10, 2015	Haleakala	Pan-STARRS 1	·	1.8 km	MPC · JPL
847416	2025 HS_{22}	—	May 24, 2014	Mount Lemmon	Mount Lemmon Survey	·	2.2 km	MPC · JPL
847417	2025 HP_{27}	—	July 24, 2015	Haleakala	Pan-STARRS 1	·	1.9 km	MPC · JPL
847418	2025 HX_{36}	—	April 25, 2025	Subaru Telescope,	S. S. Sheppard, D. J. Tholen	centaur	80 km	MPC · JPL
847419	2025 JO_{2}	—	January 28, 2020	Mount Lemmon	Mount Lemmon Survey	·	1.3 km	MPC · JPL
847420 Livtel	2025 KN_{2}	Livtel	May 20, 2025	La Palma-Liverpool	Romanov, F. D.	·	510 m	MPC · JPL
847421	2025 ME_{20}	—	August 14, 2015	Haleakala	Pan-STARRS 1	·	730 m	MPC · JPL
847422	2025 MM_{20}	—	October 4, 2018	Haleakala	Pan-STARRS 2	·	1.1 km	MPC · JPL
847423	2025 MB_{41}	—	November 2, 2018	Haleakala	Pan-STARRS 2	·	1.1 km	MPC · JPL
847424	2025 MG_{49}	—	December 16, 2017	Mount Lemmon	Mount Lemmon Survey	·	1.9 km	MPC · JPL
847425	2025 MS_{50}	—	August 9, 2021	Haleakala	Pan-STARRS 1	·	1.8 km	MPC · JPL
847426	2025 MN_{52}	—	October 7, 2016	Haleakala	Pan-STARRS 1	·	1.7 km	MPC · JPL
847427	2025 ML_{53}	—	November 16, 2014	Mount Lemmon	Mount Lemmon Survey	·	970 m	MPC · JPL
847428	1992 SC_{8}	—	September 26, 1992	Kitt Peak	Spacewatch	·	830 m	MPC · JPL
847429	1993 PA_{1}	—	August 13, 1993	Kitt Peak	Spacewatch	·	550 m	MPC · JPL
847430	1994 AC_{5}	—	January 5, 1994	Kitt Peak	Spacewatch	·	500 m	MPC · JPL
847431	1994 CJ_{1}	—	February 10, 1994	Kitt Peak	Spacewatch	AMO · APO · PHA · moon	180 m	MPC · JPL
847432	1994 RH_{6}	—	September 12, 1994	Kitt Peak	Spacewatch	·	480 m	MPC · JPL
847433	1994 RB_{30}	—	September 12, 1994	Kitt Peak	Spacewatch	·	1.8 km	MPC · JPL
847434	1994 RE_{30}	—	September 14, 1994	Kitt Peak	Spacewatch	·	1.1 km	MPC · JPL
847435	1994 SU_{4}	—	September 28, 1994	Kitt Peak	Spacewatch	·	960 m	MPC · JPL
847436	1994 SJ_{8}	—	September 28, 1994	Kitt Peak	Spacewatch	·	780 m	MPC · JPL
847437	1994 TO_{8}	—	October 6, 1994	Kitt Peak	Spacewatch	·	1.1 km	MPC · JPL
847438	1994 UK_{13}	—	October 26, 1994	Kitt Peak	Spacewatch	·	1.1 km	MPC · JPL
847439	1994 VM_{4}	—	October 28, 1994	Kitt Peak	Spacewatch	·	1.2 km	MPC · JPL
847440	1994 WZ_{1}	—	November 29, 1994	Kitt Peak	Spacewatch	·	720 m	MPC · JPL
847441	1995 CH_{8}	—	February 2, 1995	Kitt Peak	Spacewatch	·	780 m	MPC · JPL
847442	1995 MA_{8}	—	June 26, 1995	Kitt Peak	Spacewatch	·	750 m	MPC · JPL
847443	1995 MM_{8}	—	June 28, 1995	Kitt Peak	Spacewatch	·	1.0 km	MPC · JPL
847444	1995 QS_{12}	—	August 22, 1995	Kitt Peak	Spacewatch	·	1 km	MPC · JPL
847445	1995 SB_{7}	—	September 17, 1995	Kitt Peak	Spacewatch	·	900 m	MPC · JPL
847446	1995 SL_{8}	—	September 17, 1995	Kitt Peak	Spacewatch	·	690 m	MPC · JPL
847447	1995 SV_{13}	—	September 18, 1995	Kitt Peak	Spacewatch	·	1.1 km	MPC · JPL
847448	1995 SK_{15}	—	September 18, 1995	Kitt Peak	Spacewatch	·	1.5 km	MPC · JPL
847449	1995 SM_{33}	—	September 21, 1995	Kitt Peak	Spacewatch	THM	1.6 km	MPC · JPL
847450	1995 SF_{34}	—	September 18, 1995	Kitt Peak	Spacewatch	NYS	710 m	MPC · JPL
847451	1995 SH_{42}	—	September 25, 1995	Kitt Peak	Spacewatch	·	1.3 km	MPC · JPL
847452	1995 SE_{58}	—	September 22, 1995	Kitt Peak	Spacewatch	·	490 m	MPC · JPL
847453	1995 SR_{73}	—	September 29, 1995	Kitt Peak	Spacewatch	·	710 m	MPC · JPL
847454	1995 SJ_{75}	—	September 20, 1995	Kitt Peak	Spacewatch	T_{j} (2.94)	3.7 km	MPC · JPL
847455	1995 SZ_{76}	—	September 20, 1995	Kitt Peak	Spacewatch	·	680 m	MPC · JPL
847456	1995 SW_{78}	—	September 20, 1995	Kitt Peak	Spacewatch	(5)	800 m	MPC · JPL
847457	1995 SA_{83}	—	September 24, 1995	Kitt Peak	Spacewatch	·	1.1 km	MPC · JPL
847458	1995 SF_{85}	—	September 25, 1995	Kitt Peak	Spacewatch	·	940 m	MPC · JPL
847459	1995 UK_{69}	—	October 19, 1995	Kitt Peak	Spacewatch	·	710 m	MPC · JPL
847460	1995 UZ_{75}	—	October 21, 1995	Kitt Peak	Spacewatch	·	790 m	MPC · JPL
847461	1995 UP_{76}	—	October 21, 1995	Kitt Peak	Spacewatch	V	470 m	MPC · JPL
847462	1995 WE_{12}	—	November 16, 1995	Kitt Peak	Spacewatch	·	1.0 km	MPC · JPL
847463	1995 WG_{19}	—	November 17, 1995	Kitt Peak	Spacewatch	·	1.4 km	MPC · JPL
847464	1995 WV_{20}	—	November 17, 1995	Kitt Peak	Spacewatch	·	1.0 km	MPC · JPL
847465	1996 BG_{16}	—	January 21, 1996	Kitt Peak	Spacewatch	·	1.1 km	MPC · JPL
847466	1996 CK_{3}	—	February 10, 1996	Kitt Peak	Spacewatch	·	970 m	MPC · JPL
847467	1996 EX_{10}	—	March 12, 1996	Kitt Peak	Spacewatch	·	1.3 km	MPC · JPL
847468	1996 RG_{6}	—	September 5, 1996	Kitt Peak	Spacewatch	MAR	670 m	MPC · JPL
847469	1996 RP_{11}	—	September 8, 1996	Kitt Peak	Spacewatch	·	750 m	MPC · JPL
847470	1996 TC_{23}	—	October 6, 1996	Kitt Peak	Spacewatch	·	690 m	MPC · JPL
847471	1996 TG_{24}	—	October 6, 1996	Kitt Peak	Spacewatch	·	840 m	MPC · JPL
847472	1996 TG_{30}	—	October 7, 1996	Kitt Peak	Spacewatch	·	670 m	MPC · JPL
847473	1996 VT_{24}	—	November 10, 1996	Kitt Peak	Spacewatch	·	450 m	MPC · JPL
847474	1996 VA_{37}	—	November 10, 1996	Kitt Peak	Spacewatch	·	440 m	MPC · JPL
847475	1996 VD_{37}	—	October 4, 1996	Kitt Peak	Spacewatch	T_{j} (2.98) · EUP	2.5 km	MPC · JPL
847476	1996 XA_{23}	—	December 12, 1996	Kitt Peak	Spacewatch	·	1.0 km	MPC · JPL
847477	1997 JW_{2}	—	May 2, 1997	Mauna Kea	Veillet, C.	EOS	1.2 km	MPC · JPL
847478	1997 NE_{12}	—	July 10, 1997	Kitt Peak	Spacewatch	·	500 m	MPC · JPL
847479	1997 SU_{3}	—	September 23, 1997	Kitt Peak	Spacewatch	·	670 m	MPC · JPL
847480	1997 SW_{14}	—	September 28, 1997	Kitt Peak	Spacewatch	·	620 m	MPC · JPL
847481	1997 TD_{3}	—	October 3, 1997	Caussols	ODAS	·	1.6 km	MPC · JPL
847482	1997 WJ_{29}	—	November 30, 1997	Kitt Peak	Spacewatch	·	1.2 km	MPC · JPL
847483	1998 GO	—	April 3, 1998	Kitt Peak	Spacewatch	MAS	550 m	MPC · JPL
847484	1998 HK_{5}	—	April 22, 1998	Kitt Peak	Spacewatch	·	1.1 km	MPC · JPL
847485	1998 QA_{112}	—	August 26, 1998	Kitt Peak	Spacewatch	·	830 m	MPC · JPL
847486	1998 RJ_{8}	—	September 12, 1998	Kitt Peak	Spacewatch	·	1.6 km	MPC · JPL
847487	1998 RZ_{11}	—	September 13, 1998	Kitt Peak	Spacewatch	·	520 m	MPC · JPL
847488	1998 RY_{20}	—	September 14, 1998	Kitt Peak	Spacewatch	·	920 m	MPC · JPL
847489	1998 SM	—	September 16, 1998	Kitt Peak	Spacewatch	·	1.4 km	MPC · JPL
847490	1998 SJ_{91}	—	September 26, 1998	Socorro	LINEAR	·	2.3 km	MPC · JPL
847491	1998 SV_{180}	—	October 10, 2016	Haleakala	Pan-STARRS 1	·	1.5 km	MPC · JPL
847492	1998 SR_{181}	—	September 17, 1998	Kitt Peak	Spacewatch	·	510 m	MPC · JPL
847493	1998 SS_{181}	—	September 19, 1998	Sacramento Peak	SDSS	NYS	810 m	MPC · JPL
847494	1998 TC_{24}	—	October 14, 1998	Kitt Peak	Spacewatch	·	720 m	MPC · JPL
847495	1998 TU_{38}	—	December 10, 2005	Kitt Peak	Spacewatch	·	450 m	MPC · JPL
847496	1998 UO_{46}	—	October 24, 1998	Kitt Peak	Spacewatch	MAS	530 m	MPC · JPL
847497	1998 UU_{51}	—	October 20, 1998	Kitt Peak	Spacewatch	MIS	1.5 km	MPC · JPL
847498	1998 UV_{51}	—	October 28, 1998	Kitt Peak	Spacewatch	·	680 m	MPC · JPL
847499	1998 VE_{42}	—	November 15, 1998	Kitt Peak	Spacewatch	·	1.2 km	MPC · JPL
847500	1998 WU_{46}	—	October 8, 2016	Haleakala	Pan-STARRS 1	H	340 m	MPC · JPL

== 847501–847600 ==
back to top

Designation			Discovery			Properties		Ref
Permanent	Provisional	Named after	Date	Site	Discoverer(s)	Category	Diam.	Ref
847501	1998 XT_{18}	—	December 9, 1998	Kitt Peak	Spacewatch	·	910 m	MPC · JPL
847502	1999 AW_{36}	—	January 13, 1999	Mauna Kea	C. Veillet, J. Anderson	·	490 m	MPC · JPL
847503	1999 BA_{32}	—	January 10, 1999	Kitt Peak	Spacewatch	·	490 m	MPC · JPL
847504	1999 BT_{35}	—	January 21, 2006	Mount Lemmon	Mount Lemmon Survey	·	560 m	MPC · JPL
847505	1999 BU_{35}	—	February 1, 2012	Kitt Peak	Spacewatch	·	400 m	MPC · JPL
847506	1999 CQ_{129}	—	August 11, 2015	Haleakala	Pan-STARRS 1	·	1.2 km	MPC · JPL
847507	1999 CQ_{144}	—	February 8, 1999	Mauna Kea	C. Veillet, J. Anderson	·	510 m	MPC · JPL
847508	1999 CS_{144}	—	February 8, 1999	Mauna Kea	C. Veillet, J. Anderson	·	1.0 km	MPC · JPL
847509	1999 FW_{99}	—	March 4, 2017	Haleakala	Pan-STARRS 1	·	800 m	MPC · JPL
847510	1999 OY_{5}	—	July 20, 1999	Kitt Peak	Spacewatch	·	960 m	MPC · JPL
847511	1999 RR_{40}	—	September 4, 1999	Kitt Peak	Spacewatch	·	1.1 km	MPC · JPL
847512	1999 RE_{42}	—	September 13, 1999	Ondřejov	P. Pravec, P. Kušnirák	·	2.0 km	MPC · JPL
847513	1999 RW_{175}	—	September 14, 1999	Kitt Peak	Spacewatch	·	430 m	MPC · JPL
847514	1999 RS_{186}	—	September 14, 1999	Kitt Peak	Spacewatch	·	1.1 km	MPC · JPL
847515	1999 RG_{244}	—	September 5, 1999	Kitt Peak	Spacewatch	·	1.3 km	MPC · JPL
847516	1999 RM_{260}	—	October 20, 2012	Haleakala	Pan-STARRS 1	·	910 m	MPC · JPL
847517	1999 SJ_{10}	—	September 30, 1999	Socorro	LINEAR	APO	400 m	MPC · JPL
847518	1999 SE_{29}	—	May 21, 2015	Haleakala	Pan-STARRS 1	·	430 m	MPC · JPL
847519	1999 SM_{29}	—	October 24, 2014	Mount Lemmon	Mount Lemmon Survey	MAS	520 m	MPC · JPL
847520	1999 SO_{29}	—	October 9, 2010	Mount Lemmon	Mount Lemmon Survey	MAS	480 m	MPC · JPL
847521	1999 TP_{24}	—	October 4, 1999	Kitt Peak	Spacewatch	MAS	510 m	MPC · JPL
847522	1999 TS_{33}	—	October 4, 1999	Socorro	LINEAR	·	810 m	MPC · JPL
847523	1999 TT_{44}	—	October 3, 1999	Kitt Peak	Spacewatch	BRG	760 m	MPC · JPL
847524	1999 TD_{49}	—	October 4, 1999	Kitt Peak	Spacewatch	·	1.0 km	MPC · JPL
847525	1999 TB_{50}	—	October 4, 1999	Kitt Peak	Spacewatch	KON	1.5 km	MPC · JPL
847526	1999 TF_{50}	—	October 4, 1999	Kitt Peak	Spacewatch	·	860 m	MPC · JPL
847527	1999 TW_{59}	—	October 7, 1999	Kitt Peak	Spacewatch	EUN	760 m	MPC · JPL
847528	1999 TG_{75}	—	October 10, 1999	Kitt Peak	Spacewatch	·	2.1 km	MPC · JPL
847529	1999 TU_{80}	—	October 11, 1999	Kitt Peak	Spacewatch	(5)	930 m	MPC · JPL
847530	1999 TC_{164}	—	October 9, 1999	Socorro	LINEAR	·	970 m	MPC · JPL
847531	1999 TX_{336}	—	October 3, 1999	Kitt Peak	Spacewatch	·	1.1 km	MPC · JPL
847532	1999 TM_{339}	—	September 25, 2006	Kitt Peak	Spacewatch	·	490 m	MPC · JPL
847533	1999 TQ_{339}	—	November 1, 1999	Kitt Peak	Spacewatch	·	760 m	MPC · JPL
847534	1999 TX_{339}	—	July 26, 2011	Haleakala	Pan-STARRS 1	·	830 m	MPC · JPL
847535	1999 TB_{340}	—	September 5, 2010	Mount Lemmon	Mount Lemmon Survey	·	800 m	MPC · JPL
847536	1999 TA_{342}	—	August 18, 2014	Haleakala	Pan-STARRS 1	PHO	560 m	MPC · JPL
847537	1999 UW_{21}	—	October 31, 1999	Kitt Peak	Spacewatch	·	1.3 km	MPC · JPL
847538	1999 UX_{30}	—	October 31, 1999	Kitt Peak	Spacewatch	·	810 m	MPC · JPL
847539	1999 UF_{59}	—	October 31, 1999	Kitt Peak	Spacewatch	·	620 m	MPC · JPL
847540	1999 UT_{59}	—	October 30, 1999	Kitt Peak	Spacewatch	·	1.5 km	MPC · JPL
847541	1999 VA_{16}	—	November 2, 1999	Kitt Peak	Spacewatch	NYS	590 m	MPC · JPL
847542	1999 VA_{46}	—	November 3, 1999	Socorro	LINEAR	·	1.1 km	MPC · JPL
847543	1999 VS_{92}	—	October 9, 1999	Socorro	LINEAR	·	1.0 km	MPC · JPL
847544	1999 VT_{120}	—	November 4, 1999	Kitt Peak	Spacewatch	·	710 m	MPC · JPL
847545	1999 VC_{122}	—	November 4, 1999	Kitt Peak	Spacewatch	·	420 m	MPC · JPL
847546	1999 VY_{131}	—	November 9, 1999	Kitt Peak	Spacewatch	·	790 m	MPC · JPL
847547	1999 VH_{153}	—	November 11, 1999	Kitt Peak	Spacewatch	·	490 m	MPC · JPL
847548	1999 VF_{209}	—	November 14, 1999	Socorro	LINEAR	·	1.2 km	MPC · JPL
847549	1999 VV_{221}	—	November 6, 1999	Kitt Peak	Spacewatch	·	910 m	MPC · JPL
847550	1999 VA_{226}	—	November 6, 1999	Kitt Peak	Spacewatch	·	930 m	MPC · JPL
847551	1999 VY_{232}	—	January 2, 2009	Kitt Peak	Spacewatch	·	920 m	MPC · JPL
847552	1999 VW_{233}	—	November 1, 1999	Kitt Peak	Spacewatch	·	710 m	MPC · JPL
847553	1999 VJ_{234}	—	November 15, 1999	Kitt Peak	Spacewatch	·	1.2 km	MPC · JPL
847554	1999 WA_{21}	—	November 16, 1999	Kitt Peak	Spacewatch	MAS	550 m	MPC · JPL
847555	1999 XJ_{244}	—	December 3, 1999	Kitt Peak	Spacewatch	DOR	1.7 km	MPC · JPL
847556	1999 XM_{266}	—	August 23, 2014	Haleakala	Pan-STARRS 1	·	780 m	MPC · JPL
847557	1999 YH_{2}	—	December 8, 1999	Kitt Peak	Spacewatch	T_{j} (2.97)	2.8 km	MPC · JPL
847558	2000 AF_{259}	—	July 30, 2014	Haleakala	Pan-STARRS 1	·	1.7 km	MPC · JPL
847559	2000 AK_{259}	—	November 16, 2014	Mount Lemmon	Mount Lemmon Survey	·	860 m	MPC · JPL
847560	2000 CJ_{79}	—	February 8, 2000	Kitt Peak	Spacewatch	·	520 m	MPC · JPL
847561	2000 CE_{114}	—	January 28, 2000	Kitt Peak	Spacewatch	·	1.3 km	MPC · JPL
847562	2000 CW_{132}	—	February 4, 2000	Kitt Peak	Spacewatch	MAS	520 m	MPC · JPL
847563	2000 CO_{136}	—	February 3, 2000	Kitt Peak	Spacewatch	·	1.3 km	MPC · JPL
847564	2000 CR_{150}	—	February 7, 2000	Kitt Peak	Spacewatch	·	670 m	MPC · JPL
847565	2000 CJ_{151}	—	September 15, 2009	Kitt Peak	Spacewatch	·	720 m	MPC · JPL
847566	2000 CY_{152}	—	April 7, 2017	Haleakala	Pan-STARRS 1	·	2.2 km	MPC · JPL
847567	2000 CB_{153}	—	March 26, 2007	Kitt Peak	Spacewatch	·	410 m	MPC · JPL
847568	2000 CF_{156}	—	March 26, 2007	Mount Lemmon	Mount Lemmon Survey	·	460 m	MPC · JPL
847569	2000 CH_{156}	—	September 3, 2008	Kitt Peak	Spacewatch	·	570 m	MPC · JPL
847570	2000 CP_{156}	—	August 25, 2012	Haleakala	Pan-STARRS 1	·	710 m	MPC · JPL
847571	2000 CX_{156}	—	February 11, 2011	Mount Lemmon	Mount Lemmon Survey	·	2.4 km	MPC · JPL
847572	2000 CK_{157}	—	February 3, 2000	Kitt Peak	Spacewatch	T_{j} (2.76)	3.5 km	MPC · JPL
847573	2000 DG_{58}	—	February 29, 2000	Socorro	LINEAR	·	2.0 km	MPC · JPL
847574	2000 DG_{91}	—	February 27, 2000	Kitt Peak	Spacewatch	TIR	1.8 km	MPC · JPL
847575	2000 EU_{73}	—	March 10, 2000	Kitt Peak	Spacewatch	·	1.3 km	MPC · JPL
847576	2000 EY_{106}	—	March 14, 2000	Socorro	LINEAR	APO	460 m	MPC · JPL
847577	2000 EL_{142}	—	March 3, 2000	Socorro	LINEAR	·	1.4 km	MPC · JPL
847578	2000 ED_{203}	—	March 5, 2000	Cerro Tololo	Deep Lens Survey	VER	2.0 km	MPC · JPL
847579	2000 ED_{210}	—	December 26, 2014	Haleakala	Pan-STARRS 1	PHO	870 m	MPC · JPL
847580	2000 GY_{144}	—	April 5, 2000	Socorro	LINEAR	·	490 m	MPC · JPL
847581	2000 HO_{91}	—	April 30, 2000	Kitt Peak	Spacewatch	·	490 m	MPC · JPL
847582	2000 HF_{102}	—	April 25, 2000	Kitt Peak	Spacewatch	MAS	520 m	MPC · JPL
847583	2000 HF_{106}	—	May 12, 2007	Kitt Peak	Spacewatch	·	550 m	MPC · JPL
847584	2000 HL_{106}	—	April 27, 2000	Kitt Peak	Spacewatch	·	1.5 km	MPC · JPL
847585	2000 JD_{2}	—	May 1, 2000	Kitt Peak	Spacewatch	H	410 m	MPC · JPL
847586	2000 JZ_{95}	—	July 28, 2014	Haleakala	Pan-STARRS 1	·	410 m	MPC · JPL
847587	2000 JK_{96}	—	May 5, 2000	Sacramento Peak	SDSS	H	310 m	MPC · JPL
847588	2000 JL_{96}	—	September 28, 2008	Mount Lemmon	Mount Lemmon Survey	·	2.4 km	MPC · JPL
847589	2000 JN_{97}	—	August 3, 2014	Haleakala	Pan-STARRS 1	EUN	820 m	MPC · JPL
847590	2000 JX_{97}	—	November 14, 2012	Kitt Peak	Spacewatch	V	530 m	MPC · JPL
847591	2000 OT_{63}	—	July 31, 2000	Cerro Tololo	Deep Ecliptic Survey	·	520 m	MPC · JPL
847592	2000 OT_{64}	—	July 31, 2000	Cerro Tololo	Deep Ecliptic Survey	·	630 m	MPC · JPL
847593	2000 OQ_{70}	—	June 4, 2011	Mount Lemmon	Mount Lemmon Survey	NYS	900 m	MPC · JPL
847594	2000 OA_{71}	—	January 28, 2017	Haleakala	Pan-STARRS 1	·	1.6 km	MPC · JPL
847595	2000 ON_{71}	—	October 13, 2010	Mount Lemmon	Mount Lemmon Survey	HOF	1.7 km	MPC · JPL
847596	2000 OE_{72}	—	March 18, 2010	Kitt Peak	Spacewatch	·	650 m	MPC · JPL
847597	2000 ON_{72}	—	December 13, 2010	Mount Lemmon	Mount Lemmon Survey	·	490 m	MPC · JPL
847598	2000 OR_{72}	—	May 26, 2011	Mount Lemmon	Mount Lemmon Survey	·	810 m	MPC · JPL
847599	2000 PA_{34}	—	November 11, 2010	Mount Lemmon	Mount Lemmon Survey	·	1.4 km	MPC · JPL
847600	2000 QC_{210}	—	August 31, 2000	Socorro	LINEAR	·	560 m	MPC · JPL

== 847601–847700 ==
back to top

Designation			Discovery			Properties		Ref
Permanent	Provisional	Named after	Date	Site	Discoverer(s)	Category	Diam.	Ref
847601	2000 QU_{211}	—	August 31, 2000	Socorro	LINEAR	·	960 m	MPC · JPL
847602	2000 QA_{224}	—	August 26, 2000	Kitt Peak	Spacewatch	·	1.0 km	MPC · JPL
847603	2000 QG_{236}	—	August 26, 2000	Cerro Tololo	Deep Ecliptic Survey	·	970 m	MPC · JPL
847604	2000 QD_{237}	—	August 27, 2000	Cerro Tololo	Deep Ecliptic Survey	·	590 m	MPC · JPL
847605	2000 QZ_{241}	—	August 27, 2000	Cerro Tololo	Deep Ecliptic Survey	MAS	570 m	MPC · JPL
847606	2000 QM_{242}	—	August 27, 2000	Cerro Tololo	Deep Ecliptic Survey	·	1.6 km	MPC · JPL
847607	2000 QT_{248}	—	August 31, 2000	Kitt Peak	Spacewatch	V	360 m	MPC · JPL
847608	2000 QE_{257}	—	September 11, 2007	Mount Lemmon	Mount Lemmon Survey	·	780 m	MPC · JPL
847609	2000 QG_{257}	—	January 16, 2016	Haleakala	Pan-STARRS 1	·	630 m	MPC · JPL
847610	2000 QQ_{257}	—	February 10, 2011	Mount Lemmon	Mount Lemmon Survey	·	1.1 km	MPC · JPL
847611	2000 QM_{258}	—	January 14, 2016	Haleakala	Pan-STARRS 1	·	660 m	MPC · JPL
847612	2000 QQ_{258}	—	January 16, 2018	Haleakala	Pan-STARRS 1	MAS	600 m	MPC · JPL
847613	2000 QR_{258}	—	August 19, 2015	Kitt Peak	Spacewatch	·	760 m	MPC · JPL
847614	2000 QC_{259}	—	October 1, 2011	Kitt Peak	Spacewatch	·	730 m	MPC · JPL
847615	2000 QQ_{259}	—	September 5, 2000	Kitt Peak	Spacewatch	·	560 m	MPC · JPL
847616	2000 RA_{111}	—	November 30, 2011	Kitt Peak	Spacewatch	·	710 m	MPC · JPL
847617	2000 RG_{111}	—	September 24, 2011	Haleakala	Pan-STARRS 1	·	710 m	MPC · JPL
847618	2000 RR_{111}	—	September 26, 2000	Kitt Peak	Spacewatch	·	650 m	MPC · JPL
847619	2000 RT_{111}	—	September 19, 2017	Haleakala	Pan-STARRS 1	MAR	770 m	MPC · JPL
847620	2000 RU_{111}	—	September 5, 2000	Sacramento Peak	SDSS	EUN	700 m	MPC · JPL
847621	2000 RC_{112}	—	September 5, 2000	Sacramento Peak	SDSS	·	650 m	MPC · JPL
847622	2000 RG_{112}	—	January 2, 2016	Haleakala	Pan-STARRS 1	·	760 m	MPC · JPL
847623	2000 RS_{112}	—	October 26, 2011	Haleakala	Pan-STARRS 1	·	550 m	MPC · JPL
847624	2000 RA_{113}	—	September 4, 2000	Kitt Peak	Spacewatch	·	390 m	MPC · JPL
847625	2000 ST	—	September 19, 2000	Kitt Peak	Spacewatch	·	490 m	MPC · JPL
847626	2000 SP_{4}	—	September 22, 2000	Kitt Peak	Spacewatch	·	1.2 km	MPC · JPL
847627	2000 SX_{23}	—	September 23, 2000	Socorro	LINEAR	·	1.4 km	MPC · JPL
847628	2000 SY_{23}	—	September 23, 2000	Socorro	LINEAR	·	1.2 km	MPC · JPL
847629	2000 SV_{195}	—	September 24, 2000	Socorro	LINEAR	·	730 m	MPC · JPL
847630	2000 SE_{205}	—	September 24, 2000	Socorro	LINEAR	·	910 m	MPC · JPL
847631	2000 SJ_{229}	—	September 28, 2000	Socorro	LINEAR	·	1.1 km	MPC · JPL
847632	2000 SA_{268}	—	September 27, 2000	Socorro	LINEAR	·	700 m	MPC · JPL
847633	2000 SR_{316}	—	September 21, 2000	Haleakala	NEAT	·	2.0 km	MPC · JPL
847634	2000 SD_{346}	—	September 25, 2000	Kitt Peak	Spacewatch	·	810 m	MPC · JPL
847635	2000 SL_{361}	—	September 30, 2000	Anderson Mesa	LONEOS	·	500 m	MPC · JPL
847636	2000 ST_{379}	—	October 14, 2007	Mount Lemmon	Mount Lemmon Survey	·	460 m	MPC · JPL
847637	2000 SZ_{379}	—	September 28, 2000	Kitt Peak	Spacewatch	·	450 m	MPC · JPL
847638	2000 SA_{380}	—	September 18, 2011	Mount Lemmon	Mount Lemmon Survey	·	1.8 km	MPC · JPL
847639	2000 SJ_{380}	—	September 24, 2017	Haleakala	Pan-STARRS 1	EUN	820 m	MPC · JPL
847640	2000 ST_{380}	—	August 20, 2014	Haleakala	Pan-STARRS 1	V	440 m	MPC · JPL
847641	2000 SC_{381}	—	October 25, 2013	Mount Lemmon	Mount Lemmon Survey	·	1.0 km	MPC · JPL
847642	2000 SO_{381}	—	November 2, 2013	Mount Lemmon	Mount Lemmon Survey	·	910 m	MPC · JPL
847643	2000 SC_{383}	—	September 22, 2017	Mount Lemmon	Mount Lemmon Survey	EUP	2.6 km	MPC · JPL
847644	2000 SJ_{385}	—	August 23, 2004	Kitt Peak	Spacewatch	KON	1.8 km	MPC · JPL
847645	2000 SZ_{385}	—	January 2, 2009	Mount Lemmon	Mount Lemmon Survey	·	710 m	MPC · JPL
847646	2000 TS_{1}	—	October 1, 2000	Socorro	LINEAR	·	1.1 km	MPC · JPL
847647	2000 TV_{3}	—	September 24, 2000	Socorro	LINEAR	·	470 m	MPC · JPL
847648	2000 TN_{30}	—	September 30, 2000	Kitt Peak	Spacewatch	V	390 m	MPC · JPL
847649	2000 TN_{56}	—	September 3, 2000	Socorro	LINEAR	·	1.4 km	MPC · JPL
847650	2000 TY_{77}	—	December 26, 2011	Kitt Peak	Spacewatch	·	640 m	MPC · JPL
847651	2000 TK_{78}	—	December 9, 2015	Haleakala	Pan-STARRS 1	·	750 m	MPC · JPL
847652	2000 TQ_{78}	—	November 11, 2013	Mount Lemmon	Mount Lemmon Survey	·	1.1 km	MPC · JPL
847653	2000 TV_{78}	—	October 2, 2000	Kitt Peak	Spacewatch	·	820 m	MPC · JPL
847654	2000 TA_{79}	—	November 20, 2000	Kitt Peak	Spacewatch	·	640 m	MPC · JPL
847655	2000 TO_{79}	—	January 20, 2015	Haleakala	Pan-STARRS 1	·	1.1 km	MPC · JPL
847656	2000 TC_{80}	—	January 28, 2015	Haleakala	Pan-STARRS 1	·	2.7 km	MPC · JPL
847657	2000 UX_{11}	—	October 25, 2000	Kitt Peak	Spacewatch	·	560 m	MPC · JPL
847658	2000 UV_{15}	—	October 27, 2000	Kitt Peak	Spacewatch	NYS	710 m	MPC · JPL
847659	2000 UA_{116}	—	April 1, 2015	Haleakala	Pan-STARRS 1	·	1.5 km	MPC · JPL
847660	2000 UP_{116}	—	October 30, 2000	Kitt Peak	Spacewatch	·	1.2 km	MPC · JPL
847661	2000 VE_{39}	—	November 1, 2000	Kitt Peak	Spacewatch	·	620 m	MPC · JPL
847662	2000 VW_{65}	—	November 2, 2013	Mount Lemmon	Mount Lemmon Survey	·	1.1 km	MPC · JPL
847663	2000 VH_{66}	—	November 28, 2013	Mount Lemmon	Mount Lemmon Survey	(5)	1.0 km	MPC · JPL
847664	2000 WD_{65}	—	November 27, 2000	Kitt Peak	Spacewatch	NYS	610 m	MPC · JPL
847665	2000 WD_{79}	—	November 20, 2000	Socorro	LINEAR	·	810 m	MPC · JPL
847666	2000 WQ_{147}	—	November 28, 2000	Kitt Peak	Spacewatch	·	1.3 km	MPC · JPL
847667	2000 WO_{198}	—	November 18, 2008	Kitt Peak	Spacewatch	T_{j} (2.99) · 3:2	3.3 km	MPC · JPL
847668	2000 WR_{203}	—	October 24, 2017	Mount Lemmon	Mount Lemmon Survey	MAR	680 m	MPC · JPL
847669	2000 XQ_{15}	—	December 5, 2000	Socorro	LINEAR	·	820 m	MPC · JPL
847670	2000 YD_{23}	—	December 28, 2000	Kitt Peak	Spacewatch	·	1.0 km	MPC · JPL
847671	2000 YL_{145}	—	October 6, 2013	Mount Lemmon	Mount Lemmon Survey	·	440 m	MPC · JPL
847672	2001 DF_{84}	—	February 23, 2001	Cerro Tololo	Deep Lens Survey	·	420 m	MPC · JPL
847673	2001 DR_{114}	—	February 27, 2014	Kitt Peak	Spacewatch	·	1.2 km	MPC · JPL
847674	2001 DC_{115}	—	March 29, 2014	Mount Lemmon	Mount Lemmon Survey	·	1.2 km	MPC · JPL
847675	2001 DW_{115}	—	April 7, 2014	Mount Lemmon	Mount Lemmon Survey	·	1.1 km	MPC · JPL
847676	2001 DK_{116}	—	April 21, 2009	Mount Lemmon	Mount Lemmon Survey	·	870 m	MPC · JPL
847677	2001 DU_{119}	—	October 29, 2010	Mount Lemmon	Mount Lemmon Survey	HYG	1.8 km	MPC · JPL
847678	2001 DH_{120}	—	March 13, 2012	Kitt Peak	Spacewatch	·	790 m	MPC · JPL
847679	2001 DJ_{120}	—	March 23, 2018	Mount Lemmon	Mount Lemmon Survey	·	1.1 km	MPC · JPL
847680	2001 FK_{198}	—	March 26, 2001	Kitt Peak	Deep Ecliptic Survey	·	1.2 km	MPC · JPL
847681	2001 FL_{199}	—	March 21, 2001	Kitt Peak	SKADS	KOR	900 m	MPC · JPL
847682	2001 FR_{199}	—	February 10, 2008	Mount Lemmon	Mount Lemmon Survey	·	560 m	MPC · JPL
847683	2001 FV_{199}	—	March 21, 2001	Kitt Peak	SKADS	·	1.0 km	MPC · JPL
847684	2001 FB_{203}	—	September 4, 1999	Kitt Peak	Spacewatch	·	680 m	MPC · JPL
847685	2001 FQ_{203}	—	March 21, 2001	Kitt Peak	SKADS	·	1.3 km	MPC · JPL
847686	2001 FT_{203}	—	March 21, 2001	Kitt Peak	SKADS	·	940 m	MPC · JPL
847687	2001 FX_{203}	—	March 21, 2001	Kitt Peak	SKADS	·	1.1 km	MPC · JPL
847688	2001 FQ_{204}	—	March 21, 2001	Kitt Peak	SKADS	·	380 m	MPC · JPL
847689	2001 FJ_{208}	—	October 20, 2008	Mount Lemmon	Mount Lemmon Survey	KOR	850 m	MPC · JPL
847690	2001 FX_{216}	—	March 21, 2001	Kitt Peak	SKADS	MAS	460 m	MPC · JPL
847691	2001 FD_{218}	—	December 5, 2007	Kitt Peak	Spacewatch	MAS	490 m	MPC · JPL
847692	2001 FX_{221}	—	September 23, 2008	Mount Lemmon	Mount Lemmon Survey	·	1.6 km	MPC · JPL
847693	2001 FG_{224}	—	March 22, 2001	Kitt Peak	SKADS	·	1.4 km	MPC · JPL
847694	2001 FD_{225}	—	March 22, 2001	Kitt Peak	SKADS	·	1.6 km	MPC · JPL
847695	2001 FT_{227}	—	October 12, 2009	Mount Lemmon	Mount Lemmon Survey	·	410 m	MPC · JPL
847696	2001 FV_{232}	—	October 23, 2009	Mount Lemmon	Mount Lemmon Survey	·	460 m	MPC · JPL
847697	2001 FK_{240}	—	March 29, 2001	Kitt Peak	SKADS	·	1.2 km	MPC · JPL
847698	2001 FQ_{245}	—	March 26, 2012	Mount Lemmon	Mount Lemmon Survey	·	2.4 km	MPC · JPL
847699	2001 FE_{246}	—	September 9, 2015	Haleakala	Pan-STARRS 1	·	810 m	MPC · JPL
847700	2001 FG_{248}	—	April 18, 2015	Haleakala	Pan-STARRS 1	·	550 m	MPC · JPL

== 847701–847800 ==
back to top

Designation			Discovery			Properties		Ref
Permanent	Provisional	Named after	Date	Site	Discoverer(s)	Category	Diam.	Ref
847701	2001 FQ_{248}	—	March 21, 2001	Kitt Peak	SKADS	·	1.3 km	MPC · JPL
847702	2001 HU_{69}	—	March 27, 2012	Mount Lemmon	Mount Lemmon Survey	·	2.1 km	MPC · JPL
847703	2001 HZ_{69}	—	January 13, 2011	Mount Lemmon	Mount Lemmon Survey	·	450 m	MPC · JPL
847704	2001 HC_{70}	—	March 10, 2016	Mount Lemmon	Mount Lemmon Survey	·	830 m	MPC · JPL
847705	2001 HG_{71}	—	November 5, 2016	Mount Lemmon	Mount Lemmon Survey	EUN	740 m	MPC · JPL
847706	2001 KV_{83}	—	January 18, 2012	Kitt Peak	Spacewatch	·	990 m	MPC · JPL
847707	2001 KJ_{85}	—	September 6, 2015	Haleakala	Pan-STARRS 1	·	1.1 km	MPC · JPL
847708	2001 KR_{85}	—	November 1, 2006	Kitt Peak	Spacewatch	MAS	440 m	MPC · JPL
847709	2001 KF_{86}	—	October 8, 2008	Kitt Peak	Spacewatch	THM	1.5 km	MPC · JPL
847710	2001 KL_{86}	—	September 23, 2008	Mount Lemmon	Mount Lemmon Survey	·	1.7 km	MPC · JPL
847711	2001 KT_{86}	—	May 24, 2001	Cerro Tololo	Deep Ecliptic Survey	·	880 m	MPC · JPL
847712	2001 KA_{87}	—	August 18, 2017	Haleakala	Pan-STARRS 1	3:2	4.3 km	MPC · JPL
847713	2001 KB_{87}	—	April 6, 2011	Mount Lemmon	Mount Lemmon Survey	·	450 m	MPC · JPL
847714	2001 KM_{87}	—	October 24, 2009	Kitt Peak	Spacewatch	·	530 m	MPC · JPL
847715	2001 KZ_{87}	—	August 12, 2015	Haleakala	Pan-STARRS 1	·	1.4 km	MPC · JPL
847716	2001 KJ_{88}	—	March 26, 2008	Mount Lemmon	Mount Lemmon Survey	·	590 m	MPC · JPL
847717	2001 KC_{89}	—	December 9, 2012	Mount Lemmon	Mount Lemmon Survey	·	1.0 km	MPC · JPL
847718	2001 KG_{89}	—	May 20, 2014	Haleakala	Pan-STARRS 1	·	450 m	MPC · JPL
847719	2001 LG_{20}	—	March 16, 2012	Haleakala	Pan-STARRS 1	·	1.0 km	MPC · JPL
847720	2001 LO_{20}	—	December 4, 2015	Haleakala	Pan-STARRS 1	·	1.2 km	MPC · JPL
847721	2001 MJ_{32}	—	May 6, 2014	Mount Lemmon	Mount Lemmon Survey	EUN	770 m	MPC · JPL
847722	2001 NZ_{16}	—	July 14, 2001	Palomar	NEAT	·	530 m	MPC · JPL
847723	2001 OC_{115}	—	July 25, 2015	Haleakala	Pan-STARRS 1	·	1.4 km	MPC · JPL
847724	2001 PZ_{67}	—	August 14, 2001	Haleakala	NEAT	·	730 m	MPC · JPL
847725	2001 QG_{88}	—	August 21, 2001	Kitt Peak	Spacewatch	NYS	840 m	MPC · JPL
847726	2001 QT_{108}	—	August 22, 2001	Socorro	LINEAR	·	1.0 km	MPC · JPL
847727	2001 QV_{108}	—	August 23, 2001	Siding Spring	R. H. McNaught	·	490 m	MPC · JPL
847728	2001 QB_{232}	—	August 24, 2001	Anderson Mesa	LONEOS	·	1.1 km	MPC · JPL
847729	2001 QA_{300}	—	August 19, 2001	Cerro Tololo	Deep Ecliptic Survey	·	1.2 km	MPC · JPL
847730	2001 QG_{300}	—	August 19, 2001	Cerro Tololo	Deep Ecliptic Survey	·	410 m	MPC · JPL
847731	2001 QL_{303}	—	August 19, 2001	Cerro Tololo	Deep Ecliptic Survey	·	510 m	MPC · JPL
847732	2001 QM_{304}	—	August 19, 2001	Cerro Tololo	Deep Ecliptic Survey	·	2.3 km	MPC · JPL
847733	2001 QF_{306}	—	August 19, 2001	Cerro Tololo	Deep Ecliptic Survey	·	1.5 km	MPC · JPL
847734	2001 QD_{308}	—	August 19, 2001	Cerro Tololo	Deep Ecliptic Survey	·	1.1 km	MPC · JPL
847735	2001 QR_{317}	—	August 20, 2001	Cerro Tololo	Deep Ecliptic Survey	·	400 m	MPC · JPL
847736	2001 QG_{319}	—	August 20, 2001	Cerro Tololo	Deep Ecliptic Survey	MAS	500 m	MPC · JPL
847737	2001 QP_{332}	—	September 19, 2012	Mount Lemmon	Mount Lemmon Survey	·	650 m	MPC · JPL
847738	2001 QF_{336}	—	August 30, 2005	Kitt Peak	Spacewatch	NYS	890 m	MPC · JPL
847739	2001 QA_{337}	—	August 22, 2014	Haleakala	Pan-STARRS 1	·	1.2 km	MPC · JPL
847740	2001 QW_{337}	—	September 14, 2014	Haleakala	Pan-STARRS 1	·	1.1 km	MPC · JPL
847741	2001 QK_{338}	—	November 1, 2006	Kitt Peak	Spacewatch	·	1.0 km	MPC · JPL
847742	2001 QP_{338}	—	February 28, 2008	Mount Lemmon	Mount Lemmon Survey	·	1.5 km	MPC · JPL
847743	2001 RY_{19}	—	August 27, 2001	Anderson Mesa	LONEOS	·	1.9 km	MPC · JPL
847744	2001 RM_{47}	—	August 24, 2001	Socorro	LINEAR	·	940 m	MPC · JPL
847745	2001 RJ_{51}	—	August 26, 2001	Palomar	NEAT	·	1.9 km	MPC · JPL
847746	2001 RX_{54}	—	September 12, 2001	Socorro	LINEAR	·	700 m	MPC · JPL
847747	2001 RY_{59}	—	September 12, 2001	Socorro	LINEAR	·	720 m	MPC · JPL
847748	2001 RN_{134}	—	September 12, 2001	Socorro	LINEAR	EUN	1.1 km	MPC · JPL
847749	2001 RO_{137}	—	September 12, 2001	Socorro	LINEAR	T_{j} (2.97)	2.9 km	MPC · JPL
847750	2001 RZ_{156}	—	May 22, 2014	Mount Lemmon	Mount Lemmon Survey	·	440 m	MPC · JPL
847751	2001 SM_{39}	—	September 16, 2001	Socorro	LINEAR	·	1.4 km	MPC · JPL
847752	2001 SP_{103}	—	September 20, 2001	Socorro	LINEAR	·	2.5 km	MPC · JPL
847753	2001 SU_{134}	—	September 16, 2001	Socorro	LINEAR	·	1.2 km	MPC · JPL
847754	2001 SH_{167}	—	September 19, 2001	Socorro	LINEAR	·	1.3 km	MPC · JPL
847755	2001 SS_{172}	—	September 16, 2001	Socorro	LINEAR	·	1.1 km	MPC · JPL
847756	2001 SU_{208}	—	September 19, 2001	Socorro	LINEAR	·	1.1 km	MPC · JPL
847757	2001 SD_{217}	—	September 19, 2001	Socorro	LINEAR	·	920 m	MPC · JPL
847758	2001 SU_{236}	—	September 19, 2001	Socorro	LINEAR	EUN	930 m	MPC · JPL
847759	2001 SY_{261}	—	September 21, 2001	Socorro	LINEAR	·	760 m	MPC · JPL
847760	2001 SE_{275}	—	August 22, 2001	Kitt Peak	Spacewatch	·	1.3 km	MPC · JPL
847761	2001 SS_{304}	—	September 20, 2001	Socorro	LINEAR	·	410 m	MPC · JPL
847762	2001 SH_{344}	—	September 18, 2001	Anderson Mesa	LONEOS	·	1.6 km	MPC · JPL
847763	2001 SA_{360}	—	February 20, 2015	Haleakala	Pan-STARRS 1	·	800 m	MPC · JPL
847764	2001 SP_{361}	—	July 11, 2015	Haleakala	Pan-STARRS 1	·	720 m	MPC · JPL
847765	2001 SQ_{361}	—	February 28, 2016	Haleakala	Pan-STARRS 1	·	2.5 km	MPC · JPL
847766	2001 SR_{363}	—	August 8, 2018	Haleakala	Pan-STARRS 1	·	2.0 km	MPC · JPL
847767	2001 TG_{13}	—	October 11, 2001	Palomar	NEAT	H	500 m	MPC · JPL
847768	2001 TH_{54}	—	September 10, 2001	Socorro	LINEAR	·	1.1 km	MPC · JPL
847769	2001 TM_{58}	—	September 20, 2001	Socorro	LINEAR	·	990 m	MPC · JPL
847770	2001 TE_{99}	—	September 28, 2001	Palomar	NEAT	·	500 m	MPC · JPL
847771	2001 TU_{146}	—	September 16, 2001	Socorro	LINEAR	·	1.6 km	MPC · JPL
847772	2001 TK_{150}	—	October 10, 2001	Palomar	NEAT	·	1.6 km	MPC · JPL
847773	2001 TR_{173}	—	October 14, 2001	Socorro	LINEAR	·	1.8 km	MPC · JPL
847774	2001 TO_{193}	—	September 21, 2001	Socorro	LINEAR	·	420 m	MPC · JPL
847775	2001 TL_{210}	—	October 13, 2001	Anderson Mesa	LONEOS	·	1.5 km	MPC · JPL
847776	2001 TH_{213}	—	October 13, 2001	Anderson Mesa	LONEOS	·	820 m	MPC · JPL
847777	2001 TK_{237}	—	October 8, 2001	Palomar	NEAT	·	1.3 km	MPC · JPL
847778	2001 TE_{260}	—	September 18, 2001	Kitt Peak	Spacewatch	NYS	560 m	MPC · JPL
847779	2001 TH_{263}	—	September 23, 2012	Mount Lemmon	Mount Lemmon Survey	·	800 m	MPC · JPL
847780	2001 TK_{268}	—	April 15, 2015	Kitt Peak	Research and Education Collaborative Occultation Network	NYS	670 m	MPC · JPL
847781	2001 TM_{269}	—	October 14, 2001	Kitt Peak	Spacewatch	·	830 m	MPC · JPL
847782	2001 UB_{2}	—	September 20, 2001	Socorro	LINEAR	·	950 m	MPC · JPL
847783	2001 UK_{11}	—	October 18, 2001	Palomar	NEAT	H	420 m	MPC · JPL
847784	2001 UA_{38}	—	October 17, 2001	Socorro	LINEAR	·	1.1 km	MPC · JPL
847785	2001 UB_{69}	—	October 17, 2001	Kitt Peak	Spacewatch	·	700 m	MPC · JPL
847786	2001 UM_{70}	—	October 17, 2001	Kitt Peak	Spacewatch	·	470 m	MPC · JPL
847787	2001 UN_{84}	—	October 15, 2001	Kitt Peak	Spacewatch	·	510 m	MPC · JPL
847788	2001 UF_{91}	—	October 23, 2001	Kitt Peak	Spacewatch	·	990 m	MPC · JPL
847789	2001 UD_{135}	—	September 19, 2001	Socorro	LINEAR	·	580 m	MPC · JPL
847790	2001 UO_{147}	—	October 18, 2001	Palomar	NEAT	·	2.0 km	MPC · JPL
847791	2001 UH_{182}	—	September 25, 2001	Socorro	LINEAR	JUN	900 m	MPC · JPL
847792	2001 UU_{190}	—	September 28, 2001	Palomar	NEAT	EUN	880 m	MPC · JPL
847793	2001 UV_{194}	—	October 18, 2001	Palomar	NEAT	·	1.0 km	MPC · JPL
847794	2001 UC_{196}	—	October 15, 2001	Kitt Peak	Spacewatch	MAS	580 m	MPC · JPL
847795	2001 UA_{203}	—	October 19, 2001	Kitt Peak	Spacewatch	·	470 m	MPC · JPL
847796	2001 UR_{213}	—	September 12, 2001	Kitt Peak	Spacewatch	·	800 m	MPC · JPL
847797	2001 UH_{215}	—	October 23, 2001	Socorro	LINEAR	·	720 m	MPC · JPL
847798	2001 UK_{223}	—	August 27, 2005	Palomar	NEAT	·	780 m	MPC · JPL
847799	2001 UA_{228}	—	October 26, 2001	Kitt Peak	Spacewatch	(2076)	520 m	MPC · JPL
847800	2001 UU_{231}	—	October 18, 2001	Palomar	NEAT	·	1.2 km	MPC · JPL

== 847801–847900 ==
back to top

Designation			Discovery			Properties		Ref
Permanent	Provisional	Named after	Date	Site	Discoverer(s)	Category	Diam.	Ref
847801	2001 UU_{237}	—	August 30, 2005	Kitt Peak	Spacewatch	·	990 m	MPC · JPL
847802	2001 UP_{238}	—	October 23, 2008	Kitt Peak	Spacewatch	·	480 m	MPC · JPL
847803	2001 UR_{238}	—	November 11, 2010	Mount Lemmon	Mount Lemmon Survey	·	1.4 km	MPC · JPL
847804	2001 UY_{240}	—	October 18, 2001	Palomar	NEAT	·	430 m	MPC · JPL
847805	2001 UJ_{241}	—	October 19, 2001	Palomar	NEAT	·	850 m	MPC · JPL
847806	2001 UM_{241}	—	October 17, 2001	Kitt Peak	Spacewatch	·	1.3 km	MPC · JPL
847807	2001 VQ_{2}	—	November 9, 2001	Socorro	LINEAR	PHO	570 m	MPC · JPL
847808	2001 VC_{135}	—	March 27, 2011	Mount Lemmon	Mount Lemmon Survey	H	310 m	MPC · JPL
847809	2001 VB_{138}	—	December 26, 2014	Haleakala	Pan-STARRS 1	·	860 m	MPC · JPL
847810	2001 VZ_{138}	—	November 11, 2001	Sacramento Peak	SDSS	·	1.8 km	MPC · JPL
847811	2001 WL_{68}	—	November 20, 2001	Socorro	LINEAR	·	620 m	MPC · JPL
847812	2001 WS_{70}	—	November 20, 2001	Socorro	LINEAR	·	1.2 km	MPC · JPL
847813	2001 WJ_{95}	—	November 20, 2001	Socorro	LINEAR	·	550 m	MPC · JPL
847814	2001 WC_{107}	—	November 14, 2012	Mount Lemmon	Mount Lemmon Survey	MAS	430 m	MPC · JPL
847815	2001 WL_{107}	—	September 5, 2008	Kitt Peak	Spacewatch	·	790 m	MPC · JPL
847816	2001 XB_{69}	—	November 18, 2001	Socorro	LINEAR	H	410 m	MPC · JPL
847817	2001 XU_{102}	—	December 14, 2001	Socorro	LINEAR	·	1.2 km	MPC · JPL
847818	2001 XF_{202}	—	October 13, 2001	Anderson Mesa	LONEOS	·	1.8 km	MPC · JPL
847819	2001 XL_{220}	—	November 11, 2001	Socorro	LINEAR	EUP	3.1 km	MPC · JPL
847820	2001 XC_{225}	—	December 15, 2001	Socorro	LINEAR	H	450 m	MPC · JPL
847821	2001 YP_{100}	—	December 17, 2001	Socorro	LINEAR	·	3.2 km	MPC · JPL
847822	2001 YP_{165}	—	September 23, 2015	Haleakala	Pan-STARRS 1	·	710 m	MPC · JPL
847823	2002 AS_{31}	—	January 13, 2002	Socorro	LINEAR	H	460 m	MPC · JPL
847824	2002 AM_{191}	—	January 13, 2002	Kitt Peak	Spacewatch	·	580 m	MPC · JPL
847825	2002 AQ_{211}	—	December 21, 2008	Kitt Peak	Spacewatch	·	450 m	MPC · JPL
847826	2002 AM_{213}	—	July 24, 2017	Haleakala	Pan-STARRS 1	THB	1.8 km	MPC · JPL
847827	2002 BH_{2}	—	January 8, 2002	Socorro	LINEAR	BAR	880 m	MPC · JPL
847828	2002 BK_{33}	—	August 24, 2011	Haleakala	Pan-STARRS 1	TIR	2.2 km	MPC · JPL
847829	2002 CV_{135}	—	January 22, 2002	Kitt Peak	Spacewatch	·	1.2 km	MPC · JPL
847830	2002 CR_{196}	—	February 10, 2002	Socorro	LINEAR	·	700 m	MPC · JPL
847831	2002 CT_{279}	—	February 7, 2002	Kitt Peak	Spacewatch	·	1.1 km	MPC · JPL
847832	2002 CE_{304}	—	February 13, 2002	Kitt Peak	Spacewatch	H	330 m	MPC · JPL
847833	2002 CD_{322}	—	July 7, 2014	Haleakala	Pan-STARRS 1	·	800 m	MPC · JPL
847834	2002 CQ_{322}	—	September 21, 2011	Kitt Peak	Spacewatch	NYS	620 m	MPC · JPL
847835	2002 CV_{323}	—	October 26, 2011	Haleakala	Pan-STARRS 1	·	830 m	MPC · JPL
847836	2002 CP_{324}	—	August 27, 2014	Haleakala	Pan-STARRS 1	KOR	980 m	MPC · JPL
847837	2002 CR_{325}	—	September 20, 2011	Kitt Peak	Spacewatch	MAS	510 m	MPC · JPL
847838	2002 CP_{327}	—	March 16, 2018	Mount Lemmon	Mount Lemmon Survey	PHO	700 m	MPC · JPL
847839	2002 CV_{328}	—	February 8, 2002	Kitt Peak	Deep Ecliptic Survey	·	1.6 km	MPC · JPL
847840	2002 DD_{5}	—	February 18, 2002	Cerro Tololo	Deep Lens Survey	·	1.6 km	MPC · JPL
847841	2002 DC_{22}	—	February 23, 2015	Haleakala	Pan-STARRS 1	BAR	710 m	MPC · JPL
847842	2002 EG_{36}	—	March 9, 2002	Kitt Peak	Spacewatch	·	900 m	MPC · JPL
847843	2002 ES_{36}	—	March 9, 2002	Kitt Peak	Spacewatch	MAS	570 m	MPC · JPL
847844	2002 EP_{142}	—	March 12, 2002	Palomar	NEAT	·	940 m	MPC · JPL
847845	2002 EA_{168}	—	March 15, 2009	Kitt Peak	Spacewatch	PHO	620 m	MPC · JPL
847846	2002 EE_{168}	—	October 23, 2008	Kitt Peak	Spacewatch	MAS	510 m	MPC · JPL
847847	2002 EJ_{168}	—	April 2, 2006	Kitt Peak	Spacewatch	·	800 m	MPC · JPL
847848	2002 EP_{171}	—	January 22, 2013	Kitt Peak	Spacewatch	MAS	500 m	MPC · JPL
847849	2002 FC_{6}	—	March 21, 2002	Anderson Mesa	LONEOS	·	1.4 km	MPC · JPL
847850	2002 FL_{18}	—	February 13, 2002	Kitt Peak	Spacewatch	·	2.0 km	MPC · JPL
847851	2002 FV_{43}	—	October 1, 2010	Mount Lemmon	Mount Lemmon Survey	·	470 m	MPC · JPL
847852	2002 FL_{44}	—	March 21, 2002	Kitt Peak	Spacewatch	·	1.7 km	MPC · JPL
847853	2002 GD_{29}	—	April 7, 2002	Cerro Tololo	Deep Ecliptic Survey	EOS	1.1 km	MPC · JPL
847854	2002 GP_{31}	—	March 18, 2002	Kitt Peak	Deep Ecliptic Survey	L4	4.8 km	MPC · JPL
847855	2002 GX_{139}	—	April 13, 2002	Kitt Peak	Spacewatch	·	1.1 km	MPC · JPL
847856	2002 GX_{179}	—	April 14, 2002	Palomar Mountain	NEAT	·	1.0 km	MPC · JPL
847857	2002 GY_{184}	—	April 12, 2002	Palomar Mountain	NEAT	·	1.5 km	MPC · JPL
847858	2002 GA_{189}	—	April 9, 2002	Palomar Mountain	NEAT	·	460 m	MPC · JPL
847859	2002 GE_{189}	—	April 9, 2002	Palomar	NEAT	·	910 m	MPC · JPL
847860	2002 GS_{191}	—	April 12, 2002	Palomar	NEAT	·	1.3 km	MPC · JPL
847861	2002 GZ_{191}	—	April 13, 2002	Kitt Peak	Spacewatch	·	360 m	MPC · JPL
847862	2002 GN_{193}	—	October 27, 2008	Kitt Peak	Spacewatch	MIS	1.7 km	MPC · JPL
847863	2002 GN_{194}	—	August 27, 2014	Haleakala	Pan-STARRS 1	·	960 m	MPC · JPL
847864	2002 GC_{195}	—	April 8, 2002	Kitt Peak	Spacewatch	·	840 m	MPC · JPL
847865	2002 GJ_{195}	—	October 10, 2004	Kitt Peak	Deep Ecliptic Survey	·	750 m	MPC · JPL
847866	2002 GV_{196}	—	January 4, 2016	Haleakala	Pan-STARRS 1	·	930 m	MPC · JPL
847867	2002 GX_{196}	—	October 10, 2007	Mount Lemmon	Mount Lemmon Survey	MAS	530 m	MPC · JPL
847868	2002 JC_{68}	—	May 7, 2002	Socorro	LINEAR	T_{j} (2.84)	1.6 km	MPC · JPL
847869	2002 KW_{15}	—	May 18, 2002	Palomar	NEAT	·	530 m	MPC · JPL
847870	2002 LA_{49}	—	June 8, 2002	Socorro	LINEAR	·	1.3 km	MPC · JPL
847871	2002 LG_{62}	—	June 7, 2002	Palomar	NEAT	T_{j} (2.9)	1.7 km	MPC · JPL
847872	2002 LD_{63}	—	August 13, 2002	Palomar Mountain	NEAT	·	860 m	MPC · JPL
847873	2002 LP_{66}	—	September 19, 2014	Haleakala	Pan-STARRS 1	NYS	970 m	MPC · JPL
847874	2002 MH_{4}	—	June 21, 2002	Roque de los Muchachos	S. Collander-Brown, A. Fitzsimmons	·	1.2 km	MPC · JPL
847875	2002 NA_{63}	—	June 11, 2002	Kitt Peak	Spacewatch	·	1.1 km	MPC · JPL
847876	2002 ND_{73}	—	July 8, 2002	Palomar Mountain	NEAT	·	2.3 km	MPC · JPL
847877	2002 NM_{73}	—	August 5, 2002	Palomar Mountain	NEAT	·	440 m	MPC · JPL
847878	2002 ND_{76}	—	August 5, 2002	Palomar Mountain	NEAT	·	1.1 km	MPC · JPL
847879	2002 NM_{76}	—	July 12, 2002	Palomar	NEAT	·	1.8 km	MPC · JPL
847880	2002 NQ_{82}	—	July 8, 2002	Palomar	NEAT	PHO	830 m	MPC · JPL
847881	2002 OB_{19}	—	July 20, 2002	Palomar	NEAT	·	1.1 km	MPC · JPL
847882	2002 OC_{32}	—	July 18, 2002	Palomar Mountain	NEAT	·	500 m	MPC · JPL
847883	2002 OU_{37}	—	September 17, 2006	Sacramento Peak	SDSS Collaboration	·	740 m	MPC · JPL
847884	2002 PL_{7}	—	August 6, 2002	Palomar	NEAT	(1547)	1.1 km	MPC · JPL
847885	2002 PA_{37}	—	August 1, 2002	Socorro	LINEAR	·	1.6 km	MPC · JPL
847886	2002 PD_{77}	—	August 11, 2002	Palomar	NEAT	·	2.2 km	MPC · JPL
847887	2002 PV_{138}	—	August 11, 2002	Palomar	NEAT	·	490 m	MPC · JPL
847888	2002 PY_{141}	—	August 8, 2002	Palomar	NEAT	·	1.7 km	MPC · JPL
847889	2002 PV_{143}	—	August 9, 2002	Cerro Tololo	Deep Ecliptic Survey	·	1.5 km	MPC · JPL
847890	2002 PN_{148}	—	August 10, 2002	Cerro Tololo	Deep Ecliptic Survey	·	1.4 km	MPC · JPL
847891	2002 PX_{158}	—	August 8, 2002	Palomar Mountain	NEAT	(1547)	1.1 km	MPC · JPL
847892	2002 PB_{164}	—	August 8, 2002	Palomar Mountain	NEAT	T_{j} (2.99)	2.8 km	MPC · JPL
847893	2002 PN_{166}	—	August 14, 2002	Palomar	NEAT	·	780 m	MPC · JPL
847894	2002 PQ_{170}	—	August 11, 2002	Palomar	NEAT	·	2.1 km	MPC · JPL
847895	2002 PZ_{172}	—	August 11, 2002	Palomar Mountain	NEAT	MAS	510 m	MPC · JPL
847896	2002 PO_{179}	—	August 8, 2002	Palomar	NEAT	·	610 m	MPC · JPL
847897	2002 PZ_{181}	—	August 15, 2002	Palomar Mountain	NEAT	·	1.3 km	MPC · JPL
847898	2002 PZ_{190}	—	August 13, 2002	Palomar Mountain	NEAT	·	510 m	MPC · JPL
847899	2002 PQ_{198}	—	August 25, 2002	Palomar	NEAT	PHO	780 m	MPC · JPL
847900	2002 PC_{200}	—	August 6, 2002	Palomar	NEAT	·	430 m	MPC · JPL

== 847901–848000 ==
back to top

Designation			Discovery			Properties		Ref
Permanent	Provisional	Named after	Date	Site	Discoverer(s)	Category	Diam.	Ref
847901	2002 PK_{204}	—	July 30, 2016	Haleakala	Pan-STARRS 1	·	520 m	MPC · JPL
847902	2002 PU_{204}	—	April 6, 2008	Kitt Peak	Spacewatch	·	450 m	MPC · JPL
847903	2002 PW_{205}	—	August 13, 2012	Haleakala	Pan-STARRS 1	·	540 m	MPC · JPL
847904	2002 QU_{13}	—	August 26, 2002	Palomar	NEAT	·	2.1 km	MPC · JPL
847905	2002 QT_{38}	—	August 30, 2002	Kitt Peak	Spacewatch	·	910 m	MPC · JPL
847906	2002 QG_{46}	—	August 30, 2002	Palomar	NEAT	APO	400 m	MPC · JPL
847907	2002 QY_{52}	—	August 29, 2002	Palomar Mountain	NEAT	·	800 m	MPC · JPL
847908	2002 QS_{59}	—	September 12, 2002	Palomar	NEAT	JUN	630 m	MPC · JPL
847909	2002 QA_{60}	—	August 17, 2002	Palomar Mountain	NEAT	·	1.8 km	MPC · JPL
847910	2002 QD_{66}	—	August 18, 2002	Palomar Mountain	NEAT	·	1.2 km	MPC · JPL
847911	2002 QW_{70}	—	August 18, 2002	Palomar Mountain	NEAT	·	2.3 km	MPC · JPL
847912	2002 QS_{74}	—	February 9, 2005	Kitt Peak	Spacewatch	·	1.1 km	MPC · JPL
847913	2002 QX_{76}	—	August 29, 2002	Palomar Mountain	NEAT	MAR	830 m	MPC · JPL
847914	2002 QD_{80}	—	August 27, 2002	Palomar Mountain	NEAT	·	840 m	MPC · JPL
847915	2002 QD_{82}	—	August 19, 2002	Palomar Mountain	NEAT	·	1.2 km	MPC · JPL
847916	2002 QV_{94}	—	August 18, 2002	Palomar Mountain	NEAT	·	1.1 km	MPC · JPL
847917	2002 QJ_{96}	—	August 18, 2002	Palomar Mountain	NEAT	·	540 m	MPC · JPL
847918	2002 QJ_{100}	—	August 29, 2002	Palomar Mountain	NEAT	MAS	490 m	MPC · JPL
847919	2002 QQ_{100}	—	August 29, 2002	Palomar Mountain	NEAT	·	2.1 km	MPC · JPL
847920	2002 QY_{101}	—	August 29, 2002	Palomar Mountain	NEAT	·	890 m	MPC · JPL
847921	2002 QV_{103}	—	August 27, 2002	Palomar	NEAT	·	1.3 km	MPC · JPL
847922	2002 QW_{103}	—	August 27, 2002	Palomar Mountain	NEAT	EUP	2.7 km	MPC · JPL
847923	2002 QD_{109}	—	August 17, 2002	Palomar Mountain	NEAT	·	800 m	MPC · JPL
847924	2002 QK_{110}	—	August 17, 2002	Palomar Mountain	NEAT	·	2.1 km	MPC · JPL
847925	2002 QF_{111}	—	August 16, 2002	Palomar Mountain	NEAT	·	2.1 km	MPC · JPL
847926	2002 QP_{112}	—	August 27, 2002	Palomar Mountain	NEAT	·	1.7 km	MPC · JPL
847927	2002 QC_{113}	—	August 27, 2002	Palomar Mountain	NEAT	·	1.2 km	MPC · JPL
847928	2002 QU_{114}	—	August 28, 2002	Palomar Mountain	NEAT	·	1.1 km	MPC · JPL
847929	2002 QS_{120}	—	August 30, 2002	Palomar Mountain	NEAT	·	870 m	MPC · JPL
847930	2002 QY_{120}	—	August 30, 2002	Palomar Mountain	NEAT	DOR	1.4 km	MPC · JPL
847931	2002 QJ_{122}	—	August 26, 2002	Palomar Mountain	NEAT	·	1.3 km	MPC · JPL
847932	2002 QQ_{123}	—	August 29, 2002	Palomar Mountain	NEAT	·	990 m	MPC · JPL
847933	2002 QG_{124}	—	August 6, 2002	Palomar	NEAT	·	490 m	MPC · JPL
847934	2002 QS_{124}	—	August 29, 2002	Kitt Peak	Spacewatch	·	1.7 km	MPC · JPL
847935	2002 QY_{125}	—	August 16, 2002	Palomar Mountain	NEAT	·	2.1 km	MPC · JPL
847936	2002 QN_{126}	—	September 7, 2002	Campo Imperatore	CINEOS	·	650 m	MPC · JPL
847937	2002 QQ_{127}	—	August 29, 2002	Palomar Mountain	NEAT	(69559)	2.0 km	MPC · JPL
847938	2002 QU_{127}	—	August 30, 2002	Palomar Mountain	NEAT	·	510 m	MPC · JPL
847939	2002 QU_{130}	—	August 30, 2002	Palomar Mountain	NEAT	·	980 m	MPC · JPL
847940	2002 QW_{132}	—	August 27, 2002	Palomar Mountain	NEAT	·	430 m	MPC · JPL
847941	2002 QF_{137}	—	August 28, 2002	Palomar Mountain	NEAT	MAR	770 m	MPC · JPL
847942	2002 QL_{138}	—	August 17, 2002	Palomar Mountain	NEAT	·	1.0 km	MPC · JPL
847943	2002 QO_{138}	—	August 16, 2002	Kitt Peak	Spacewatch	·	440 m	MPC · JPL
847944	2002 QG_{141}	—	October 13, 1998	Kitt Peak	Spacewatch	·	970 m	MPC · JPL
847945	2002 QT_{141}	—	August 27, 2002	Palomar Mountain	NEAT	·	890 m	MPC · JPL
847946	2002 QB_{142}	—	August 27, 2002	Palomar	NEAT	EUN	810 m	MPC · JPL
847947	2002 QT_{144}	—	August 27, 2002	Palomar	NEAT	EOS	1.2 km	MPC · JPL
847948	2002 QY_{148}	—	August 25, 2002	Palomar Mountain	NEAT	BRG	940 m	MPC · JPL
847949	2002 QH_{151}	—	August 28, 2002	Palomar Mountain	NEAT	·	1.1 km	MPC · JPL
847950	2002 QA_{153}	—	October 1, 2008	Mount Lemmon	Mount Lemmon Survey	TIR	2.2 km	MPC · JPL
847951	2002 QT_{154}	—	August 29, 2002	Palomar Mountain	NEAT	·	1.0 km	MPC · JPL
847952	2002 QA_{156}	—	September 13, 2007	Catalina	CSS	H	290 m	MPC · JPL
847953	2002 QQ_{156}	—	June 28, 2013	Haleakala	Pan-STARRS 1	·	2.2 km	MPC · JPL
847954	2002 QM_{160}	—	August 31, 2002	Kitt Peak	Spacewatch	·	1.1 km	MPC · JPL
847955	2002 RF_{60}	—	September 6, 2002	Socorro	LINEAR	·	580 m	MPC · JPL
847956	2002 RC_{66}	—	August 29, 2002	Palomar	NEAT	·	1.4 km	MPC · JPL
847957	2002 RJ_{125}	—	September 3, 2002	Palomar	NEAT	·	1.0 km	MPC · JPL
847958	2002 RT_{130}	—	September 11, 2002	Palomar	NEAT	·	470 m	MPC · JPL
847959	2002 RU_{130}	—	September 11, 2002	Palomar	NEAT	·	450 m	MPC · JPL
847960	2002 RC_{147}	—	September 11, 2002	Palomar	NEAT	(5)	1.0 km	MPC · JPL
847961	2002 RO_{162}	—	September 12, 2002	Palomar	NEAT	(5)	900 m	MPC · JPL
847962	2002 RM_{191}	—	September 13, 2002	Palomar	NEAT	·	960 m	MPC · JPL
847963	2002 RB_{192}	—	September 12, 2002	Palomar	NEAT	·	990 m	MPC · JPL
847964	2002 RY_{193}	—	September 12, 2002	Palomar	NEAT	·	1.2 km	MPC · JPL
847965	2002 RS_{210}	—	September 15, 2002	Kitt Peak	Spacewatch	·	2.2 km	MPC · JPL
847966	2002 RG_{220}	—	September 15, 2002	Palomar	NEAT	·	1.3 km	MPC · JPL
847967	2002 RL_{234}	—	September 15, 2002	Palomar Mountain	NEAT	·	490 m	MPC · JPL
847968	2002 RC_{238}	—	September 15, 2002	Palomar Mountain	NEAT	T_{j} (2.97)	2.7 km	MPC · JPL
847969	2002 RU_{240}	—	September 11, 2002	Palomar	NEAT	·	590 m	MPC · JPL
847970	2002 RH_{244}	—	September 15, 2002	Palomar Mountain	NEAT	·	960 m	MPC · JPL
847971	2002 RZ_{245}	—	September 4, 2002	Palomar Mountain	NEAT	THM	1.7 km	MPC · JPL
847972	2002 RL_{249}	—	October 5, 2002	Sacramento Peak	SDSS	·	440 m	MPC · JPL
847973	2002 RG_{258}	—	September 14, 2002	Palomar Mountain	NEAT	EOS	1.2 km	MPC · JPL
847974	2002 RS_{260}	—	September 15, 2002	Palomar Mountain	NEAT	MAS	530 m	MPC · JPL
847975	2002 RV_{263}	—	September 13, 2002	Palomar Mountain	NEAT	·	440 m	MPC · JPL
847976	2002 RZ_{269}	—	September 4, 2002	Palomar Mountain	NEAT	·	900 m	MPC · JPL
847977	2002 RQ_{273}	—	September 4, 2002	Palomar Mountain	NEAT	NYS	910 m	MPC · JPL
847978	2002 RY_{275}	—	September 14, 2002	Palomar Mountain	NEAT	EOS	1.3 km	MPC · JPL
847979	2002 RL_{284}	—	September 12, 2002	Palomar	NEAT	·	1.3 km	MPC · JPL
847980	2002 RT_{285}	—	August 27, 2009	Kitt Peak	Spacewatch	·	540 m	MPC · JPL
847981	2002 RT_{289}	—	March 21, 2009	Mount Lemmon	Mount Lemmon Survey	H	340 m	MPC · JPL
847982	2002 RA_{290}	—	September 4, 2002	Palomar Mountain	NEAT	·	990 m	MPC · JPL
847983	2002 RR_{294}	—	October 3, 2002	Palomar Mountain	NEAT	THB	2.4 km	MPC · JPL
847984	2002 RK_{295}	—	September 3, 2002	Palomar	NEAT	·	1.4 km	MPC · JPL
847985	2002 RK_{296}	—	September 19, 2012	Mount Lemmon	Mount Lemmon Survey	·	470 m	MPC · JPL
847986	2002 RQ_{299}	—	April 27, 2012	Haleakala	Pan-STARRS 1	·	2.0 km	MPC · JPL
847987	2002 RZ_{300}	—	February 5, 2016	Haleakala	Pan-STARRS 1	·	2.3 km	MPC · JPL
847988	2002 RW_{301}	—	September 3, 2002	Palomar	NEAT	PHO	700 m	MPC · JPL
847989	2002 SU_{7}	—	September 27, 2002	Palomar	NEAT	H	410 m	MPC · JPL
847990	2002 SK_{13}	—	September 7, 2002	Socorro	LINEAR	·	1.8 km	MPC · JPL
847991	2002 SP_{13}	—	September 14, 2002	Anderson Mesa	LONEOS	·	1.6 km	MPC · JPL
847992	2002 SY_{46}	—	September 29, 2002	Haleakala	NEAT	·	980 m	MPC · JPL
847993	2002 SS_{64}	—	September 16, 2002	Palomar Mountain	NEAT	·	1.1 km	MPC · JPL
847994	2002 SO_{65}	—	September 16, 2002	Palomar Mountain	NEAT	·	1.3 km	MPC · JPL
847995	2002 SR_{69}	—	September 26, 2002	Palomar Mountain	NEAT	·	1.8 km	MPC · JPL
847996	2002 SD_{73}	—	October 4, 2006	Mount Lemmon	Mount Lemmon Survey	NYS	920 m	MPC · JPL
847997	2002 SV_{74}	—	October 16, 2002	Palomar	NEAT	·	1.0 km	MPC · JPL
847998	2002 TK_{7}	—	October 1, 2002	Anderson Mesa	LONEOS	·	1.4 km	MPC · JPL
847999	2002 TO_{75}	—	October 1, 2002	Anderson Mesa	LONEOS	·	960 m	MPC · JPL
848000	2002 TP_{106}	—	October 4, 2002	Palomar	NEAT	·	1.8 km	MPC · JPL

back to top

== Meaning of names ==
As minor planet discoveries are confirmed, they are given a permanent number by the IAU's Minor Planet Center (MPC), and the discoverers can then submit names for them, following the IAU's naming conventions. The list below concerns those minor planets in the specified number-range that have received names, and explains the meanings of those names.

Official naming citations of newly named small Solar System bodies are approved and published in a bulletin by IAU's Working Group for Small Bodies Nomenclature (WGSBN). Before May 2021, citations were published in MPC's Minor Planet Circulars for many decades. Recent citations can also be found on the JPL Small-Body Database (SBDB). Until his death in 2016, German astronomer Lutz D. Schmadel compiled these citations into the Dictionary of Minor Planet Names (DMP) and regularly updated the collection.

Based on Paul Herget's The Names of the Minor Planets, Schmadel also researched the unclear origin of numerous asteroids, most of which had been named prior to World War II. This article incorporates text from this source, which is in the public domain: SBDB New namings may only be added to this list below after official publication as the preannouncement of names is condemned. The WGSBN publishes a comprehensive guideline for the naming rules of non-cometary small Solar System bodies.

Named minor planet	Provisional	This minor planet was named for...	Ref · Catalog
847420 Livtel	2025 KN_{2}	The Liverpool Telescope (abbreviated as LivTel) is a two-meter robotic Ritchey-Chrétien telescope, located at the Roque de los Muchachos Observatory (La Palma).	IAU · 847420
