= Comet Maury (disambiguation) =

Comet Maury typically refers to 115P/Maury, the first comet discovered by French astronomer, Alain Maury. It may also refer to:

- C/1988 C1 (Maury–Phinney)
- C/2021 J1 (Maury–Attard)
- P/2021 U3 (Attard–Maury)
- C/2021 X1 (Maury–Attard)
- C/2022 J1 (Maury–Attard)
- C/2022 N1 (Attard–Maury)

Comets discovered through the MAP Observation Program are also co-attributed to Maury and his colleagues:

- C/2025 L2 (MAPS)
- C/2025 O2 (MAPS)
- C/2026 A1 (MAPS)
- C/2026 V2 (MAPS)
