= List of minor planets: 895001–896000 =

The following is a partial list of minor planets, running from minor-planet number 895001 through 896000, inclusive. The primary data for this and other partial lists is based on JPL's "Small-Body Orbital Elements" and data available from the Minor Planet Center. Critical list information is also provided by the MPC, unless otherwise specified from Lowell Observatory. A detailed description of the table's columns and additional sources are given on the main page including a complete list of every page in this series, and a statistical break-up on the dynamical classification of minor planets.

Also see the summary list of all named bodies in numerical and alphabetical order, and the corresponding naming citations for the number range of this particular list. New namings may only be added to this list after official publication, as the preannouncement of names is condemned by the Working Group for Small Bodies Nomenclature of the International Astronomical Union.

Near-Earth obj.	MBA (inner)	MBA (outer)	Centaur
Mars-crosser	MBA (middle)	Jupiter trojan	Trans-Neptunian obj.
Unclassified

== 895001–895100 ==
Designation			Discovery			Properties		Ref
Permanent	Provisional	Named after	Date	Site	Discoverer(s)	Category	Diam.	Ref
895001	2019 FG_{30}	—	March 31, 2019	Mount Lemmon	Mount Lemmon Survey	·	590 m	MPC · JPL
895002	2019 FL_{30}	—	March 29, 2019	Mount Lemmon	Mount Lemmon Survey	·	730 m	MPC · JPL
895003	2019 GB_{5}	—	June 20, 2017	Haleakala	Pan-STARRS 1	H	420 m	MPC · JPL
895004	2019 GS_{6}	—	February 20, 2012	Haleakala	Pan-STARRS 1	·	700 m	MPC · JPL
895005	2019 GX_{6}	—	March 16, 2012	Haleakala	Pan-STARRS 1	·	550 m	MPC · JPL
895006	2019 GG_{7}	—	March 9, 2019	Mount Lemmon	Mount Lemmon Survey	PHO	810 m	MPC · JPL
895007	2019 GU_{16}	—	August 11, 2016	Haleakala	Pan-STARRS 1	·	630 m	MPC · JPL
895008	2019 GO_{25}	—	April 2, 2019	Haleakala	Pan-STARRS 1	EUN	760 m	MPC · JPL
895009	2019 GM_{35}	—	April 2, 2019	Haleakala	Pan-STARRS 1	·	1.6 km	MPC · JPL
895010	2019 GP_{36}	—	February 9, 2008	Kitt Peak	Spacewatch	·	1.2 km	MPC · JPL
895011	2019 GY_{50}	—	April 4, 2019	Haleakala	Pan-STARRS 1	·	640 m	MPC · JPL
895012	2019 GU_{58}	—	April 3, 2019	Haleakala	Pan-STARRS 1	L5	5.9 km	MPC · JPL
895013	2019 GJ_{64}	—	April 4, 2019	Haleakala	Pan-STARRS 1	·	2.3 km	MPC · JPL
895014	2019 GM_{64}	—	April 4, 2019	Haleakala	Pan-STARRS 1	T_{j} (2.97) · 3:2	4.2 km	MPC · JPL
895015	2019 GM_{65}	—	April 3, 2019	Haleakala	Pan-STARRS 1	·	2.0 km	MPC · JPL
895016	2019 GR_{85}	—	April 3, 2019	Haleakala	Pan-STARRS 1	·	520 m	MPC · JPL
895017	2019 GH_{110}	—	April 6, 2019	Haleakala	Pan-STARRS 1	·	820 m	MPC · JPL
895018	2019 GE_{124}	—	April 21, 2015	Cerro Tololo-DECam	DECam	·	740 m	MPC · JPL
895019	2019 GC_{126}	—	April 2, 2019	Haleakala	Pan-STARRS 1	AGN	830 m	MPC · JPL
895020	2019 GT_{127}	—	April 2, 2019	Haleakala	Pan-STARRS 1	·	1.1 km	MPC · JPL
895021	2019 GX_{130}	—	April 4, 2019	Haleakala	Pan-STARRS 1	·	570 m	MPC · JPL
895022	2019 GN_{138}	—	April 8, 2019	Haleakala	Pan-STARRS 1	·	790 m	MPC · JPL
895023	2019 GH_{140}	—	April 6, 2019	Haleakala	Pan-STARRS 1	·	1.7 km	MPC · JPL
895024	2019 GP_{184}	—	April 8, 2019	Haleakala	Pan-STARRS 1	·	1.1 km	MPC · JPL
895025	2019 GC_{196}	—	October 15, 2017	Mount Lemmon	Mount Lemmon Survey	·	470 m	MPC · JPL
895026	2019 HE_{7}	—	April 26, 2019	Mount Lemmon	Mount Lemmon Survey	3:2	3.7 km	MPC · JPL
895027	2019 HL_{10}	—	April 26, 2019	Mount Lemmon	Mount Lemmon Survey	·	1.9 km	MPC · JPL
895028	2019 HK_{11}	—	April 25, 2019	Mount Lemmon	Mount Lemmon Survey	·	840 m	MPC · JPL
895029	2019 JO_{7}	—	May 12, 2012	Mount Lemmon	Mount Lemmon Survey	·	630 m	MPC · JPL
895030	2019 JW_{15}	—	April 5, 2019	Haleakala	Pan-STARRS 1	·	2.1 km	MPC · JPL
895031	2019 JW_{24}	—	May 7, 2019	Haleakala	Pan-STARRS 1	·	770 m	MPC · JPL
895032	2019 JW_{26}	—	September 1, 2013	Haleakala	Pan-STARRS 1	3:2 · SHU	3.9 km	MPC · JPL
895033	2019 JT_{28}	—	June 26, 2015	Haleakala	Pan-STARRS 1	·	1.3 km	MPC · JPL
895034	2019 JY_{28}	—	May 21, 2014	Haleakala	Pan-STARRS 1	·	1.3 km	MPC · JPL
895035	2019 JR_{44}	—	August 13, 2017	Haleakala	Pan-STARRS 1	H	460 m	MPC · JPL
895036	2019 JT_{45}	—	May 25, 2015	Haleakala	Pan-STARRS 1	BRG	1.3 km	MPC · JPL
895037	2019 JX_{46}	—	December 8, 2015	Haleakala	Pan-STARRS 1	H	280 m	MPC · JPL
895038	2019 JT_{49}	—	April 4, 2008	Kitt Peak	Spacewatch	·	680 m	MPC · JPL
895039	2019 JS_{69}	—	May 7, 2019	Haleakala	Pan-STARRS 1	EOS	1.5 km	MPC · JPL
895040	2019 JV_{71}	—	March 25, 2015	Mount Lemmon	Mount Lemmon Survey	·	810 m	MPC · JPL
895041	2019 JB_{74}	—	May 1, 2019	Haleakala	Pan-STARRS 1	·	1.4 km	MPC · JPL
895042	2019 JG_{77}	—	May 8, 2019	Haleakala	Pan-STARRS 1	·	1.9 km	MPC · JPL
895043	2019 JL_{80}	—	May 11, 2019	Haleakala	Pan-STARRS 1	·	1.4 km	MPC · JPL
895044	2019 JX_{85}	—	May 1, 2019	Haleakala	Pan-STARRS 1	V	420 m	MPC · JPL
895045	2019 JW_{88}	—	May 7, 2019	Haleakala	Pan-STARRS 1	·	1.7 km	MPC · JPL
895046	2019 JL_{89}	—	May 1, 2019	Haleakala	Pan-STARRS 1	·	1.5 km	MPC · JPL
895047	2019 JD_{99}	—	May 8, 2019	Haleakala	Pan-STARRS 1	VER	1.9 km	MPC · JPL
895048	2019 JO_{108}	—	May 8, 2019	Haleakala	Pan-STARRS 1	·	1.5 km	MPC · JPL
895049	2019 JQ_{110}	—	May 8, 2019	Haleakala	Pan-STARRS 1	EUN	750 m	MPC · JPL
895050	2019 JA_{111}	—	May 1, 2019	Haleakala	Pan-STARRS 1	·	2.0 km	MPC · JPL
895051	2019 JO_{112}	—	March 21, 2015	Haleakala	Pan-STARRS 1	PHO	650 m	MPC · JPL
895052	2019 KN_{3}	—	February 14, 2015	Mount Lemmon	Mount Lemmon Survey	·	830 m	MPC · JPL
895053	2019 KJ_{14}	—	January 17, 2013	Mount Lemmon	Mount Lemmon Survey	·	1.8 km	MPC · JPL
895054	2019 KX_{14}	—	May 27, 2019	Haleakala	Pan-STARRS 2	BAR	750 m	MPC · JPL
895055	2019 KB_{25}	—	May 25, 2019	Haleakala	Pan-STARRS 1	EOS	1.3 km	MPC · JPL
895056	2019 KK_{29}	—	May 26, 2019	Haleakala	Pan-STARRS 1	·	1.6 km	MPC · JPL
895057	2019 KD_{30}	—	May 27, 2019	Haleakala	Pan-STARRS 1	EOS	1.2 km	MPC · JPL
895058	2019 KV_{32}	—	May 30, 2019	Haleakala	Pan-STARRS 2	·	1.6 km	MPC · JPL
895059	2019 KZ_{32}	—	May 27, 2019	Haleakala	Pan-STARRS 1	·	1.5 km	MPC · JPL
895060	2019 KS_{34}	—	May 24, 2019	Haleakala	Pan-STARRS 2	H	300 m	MPC · JPL
895061	2019 KG_{35}	—	May 27, 2019	Haleakala	Pan-STARRS 2	H	370 m	MPC · JPL
895062	2019 KC_{39}	—	May 31, 2019	Haleakala	Pan-STARRS 1	PHO	880 m	MPC · JPL
895063	2019 KP_{42}	—	May 30, 2019	Haleakala	Pan-STARRS 1	EOS	1.3 km	MPC · JPL
895064	2019 KX_{46}	—	May 30, 2019	Haleakala	Pan-STARRS 1	EOS	1.2 km	MPC · JPL
895065	2019 KC_{52}	—	May 25, 2019	Haleakala	Pan-STARRS 1	EOS	1.3 km	MPC · JPL
895066	2019 KF_{63}	—	May 30, 2019	Haleakala	Pan-STARRS 1	H	340 m	MPC · JPL
895067	2019 LR_{2}	—	September 25, 2017	Haleakala	Pan-STARRS 1	H	330 m	MPC · JPL
895068	2019 LF_{3}	—	December 12, 2012	Mount Lemmon	Mount Lemmon Survey	H	300 m	MPC · JPL
895069	2019 LM_{10}	—	June 13, 2019	Haleakala	Pan-STARRS 1	H	450 m	MPC · JPL
895070	2019 LQ_{17}	—	June 1, 2019	Haleakala	Pan-STARRS 1	EOS	1.2 km	MPC · JPL
895071	2019 LN_{18}	—	June 2, 2019	Haleakala	Pan-STARRS 1	·	1.9 km	MPC · JPL
895072	2019 LF_{21}	—	June 3, 2019	Haleakala	Pan-STARRS 1	·	1.6 km	MPC · JPL
895073	2019 LK_{21}	—	June 1, 2019	Haleakala	Pan-STARRS 2	H	310 m	MPC · JPL
895074	2019 LV_{21}	—	June 1, 2019	Haleakala	Pan-STARRS 1	·	780 m	MPC · JPL
895075	2019 LP_{22}	—	June 3, 2019	Haleakala	Pan-STARRS 1	H	390 m	MPC · JPL
895076	2019 LW_{30}	—	March 26, 2006	Kitt Peak	Spacewatch	EUN	840 m	MPC · JPL
895077	2019 LB_{32}	—	June 12, 2019	Haleakala	Pan-STARRS 1	·	1.3 km	MPC · JPL
895078	2019 LX_{41}	—	June 8, 2019	Haleakala	Pan-STARRS 1	·	1.8 km	MPC · JPL
895079	2019 MT_{6}	—	June 28, 2019	Haleakala	Pan-STARRS 1	H	390 m	MPC · JPL
895080	2019 MS_{18}	—	June 8, 2019	Haleakala	Pan-STARRS 1	H	300 m	MPC · JPL
895081	2019 NY_{34}	—	July 5, 2019	Haleakala	Pan-STARRS 2	·	910 m	MPC · JPL
895082	2019 NK_{41}	—	July 3, 2019	Haleakala	Pan-STARRS 1	·	910 m	MPC · JPL
895083	2019 NW_{46}	—	June 17, 2015	Haleakala	Pan-STARRS 1	·	760 m	MPC · JPL
895084	2019 NM_{47}	—	July 1, 2019	Haleakala	Pan-STARRS 1	L4	6.6 km	MPC · JPL
895085	2019 NK_{51}	—	July 4, 2019	Haleakala	Pan-STARRS 1	L4 · ERY	5.9 km	MPC · JPL
895086	2019 NM_{54}	—	July 7, 2019	Haleakala	Pan-STARRS 1	·	1.8 km	MPC · JPL
895087	2019 NE_{55}	—	July 2, 2019	Haleakala	Pan-STARRS 1	·	1.5 km	MPC · JPL
895088	2019 NV_{61}	—	June 29, 2019	Haleakala	Pan-STARRS 1	·	2.5 km	MPC · JPL
895089	2019 NJ_{73}	—	July 4, 2019	Haleakala	Pan-STARRS 1	WIT	560 m	MPC · JPL
895090	2019 NZ_{80}	—	July 6, 2019	Haleakala	Pan-STARRS 1	L4	5.6 km	MPC · JPL
895091	2019 NY_{81}	—	August 12, 2015	Haleakala	Pan-STARRS 1	·	1.1 km	MPC · JPL
895092	2019 NJ_{82}	—	July 3, 2019	Haleakala	Pan-STARRS 1	·	790 m	MPC · JPL
895093	2019 NU_{82}	—	January 17, 2015	Mount Lemmon	Mount Lemmon Survey	H	370 m	MPC · JPL
895094	2019 NJ_{83}	—	July 2, 2019	Haleakala	Pan-STARRS 1	HNS	790 m	MPC · JPL
895095	2019 NN_{84}	—	July 4, 2019	Haleakala	Pan-STARRS 2	·	890 m	MPC · JPL
895096	2019 NY_{84}	—	July 2, 2019	Haleakala	Pan-STARRS 1	·	1.2 km	MPC · JPL
895097	2019 ND_{85}	—	July 1, 2019	Haleakala	Pan-STARRS 1	V	480 m	MPC · JPL
895098	2019 NS_{86}	—	March 21, 2018	Mount Lemmon	Mount Lemmon Survey	·	960 m	MPC · JPL
895099	2019 NB_{87}	—	May 27, 2014	Haleakala	Pan-STARRS 1	·	1.1 km	MPC · JPL
895100	2019 NQ_{91}	—	July 6, 2019	Haleakala	Pan-STARRS 2	H	400 m	MPC · JPL

== 895101–895200 ==
back to top

Designation			Discovery			Properties		Ref
Permanent	Provisional	Named after	Date	Site	Discoverer(s)	Category	Diam.	Ref
895101	2019 NV_{110}	—	July 1, 2019	Haleakala	Pan-STARRS 1	·	1.2 km	MPC · JPL
895102	2019 OK_{7}	—	September 19, 2006	Kitt Peak	Spacewatch	·	940 m	MPC · JPL
895103	2019 OV_{16}	—	July 28, 2019	Haleakala	Pan-STARRS 2	PHO	590 m	MPC · JPL
895104	2019 OR_{27}	—	July 25, 2019	Haleakala	Pan-STARRS 1	L4	5.5 km	MPC · JPL
895105	2019 OY_{27}	—	July 28, 2019	Haleakala	Pan-STARRS 1	L4	6.3 km	MPC · JPL
895106	2019 OA_{37}	—	May 23, 2014	Haleakala	Pan-STARRS 1	·	1.0 km	MPC · JPL
895107	2019 OG_{37}	—	July 23, 2015	Haleakala	Pan-STARRS 1	·	730 m	MPC · JPL
895108	2019 OB_{39}	—	July 28, 2019	Haleakala	Pan-STARRS 1	L4	6.2 km	MPC · JPL
895109	2019 OH_{39}	—	July 25, 2019	Haleakala	Pan-STARRS 1	L4	5.4 km	MPC · JPL
895110	2019 OV_{39}	—	July 30, 2019	Haleakala	Pan-STARRS 1	L4	5.0 km	MPC · JPL
895111	2019 OD_{59}	—	July 29, 2019	Haleakala	Pan-STARRS 1	·	1.0 km	MPC · JPL
895112	2019 PT_{18}	—	August 8, 2019	Haleakala	Pan-STARRS 1	·	2.0 km	MPC · JPL
895113	2019 PA_{29}	—	August 7, 2019	Haleakala	Pan-STARRS 2	H	310 m	MPC · JPL
895114	2019 PH_{34}	—	August 5, 2019	Haleakala	Pan-STARRS 1	H	320 m	MPC · JPL
895115	2019 PU_{44}	—	August 10, 2019	Haleakala	Pan-STARRS 1	H	390 m	MPC · JPL
895116	2019 PU_{48}	—	August 5, 2019	Haleakala	Pan-STARRS 1	·	1.1 km	MPC · JPL
895117	2019 PN_{52}	—	August 4, 2019	Haleakala	Pan-STARRS 1	·	1.4 km	MPC · JPL
895118	2019 PY_{54}	—	August 5, 2019	Haleakala	Pan-STARRS 1	L4	7.8 km	MPC · JPL
895119	2019 PB_{64}	—	August 12, 2019	Haleakala	Pan-STARRS 1	·	1.5 km	MPC · JPL
895120	2019 PR_{70}	—	August 7, 2019	Haleakala	Pan-STARRS 2	·	910 m	MPC · JPL
895121	2019 PE_{71}	—	August 9, 2019	Haleakala	Pan-STARRS 2	·	1.6 km	MPC · JPL
895122	2019 PA_{100}	—	January 6, 2013	Kitt Peak	Spacewatch	L4	5.6 km	MPC · JPL
895123	2019 QF_{4}	—	November 22, 2014	Mount Lemmon	Mount Lemmon Survey	H	450 m	MPC · JPL
895124	2019 QL_{12}	—	August 27, 2019	Mount Lemmon	Mount Lemmon Survey	·	1.8 km	MPC · JPL
895125	2019 QP_{22}	—	August 23, 2019	Haleakala	Pan-STARRS 1	·	1.0 km	MPC · JPL
895126	2019 QC_{50}	—	August 31, 2019	Haleakala	Pan-STARRS 1	·	1.7 km	MPC · JPL
895127	2019 QA_{65}	—	August 28, 2019	Haleakala	Pan-STARRS 1	H	400 m	MPC · JPL
895128	2019 QU_{69}	—	August 26, 2019	Haleakala	Pan-STARRS 2	H	360 m	MPC · JPL
895129	2019 QJ_{80}	—	August 29, 2019	Haleakala	Pan-STARRS 1	·	880 m	MPC · JPL
895130	2019 QP_{93}	—	August 28, 2019	Haleakala	Pan-STARRS 1	H	340 m	MPC · JPL
895131	2019 RM_{3}	—	July 26, 2019	Haleakala	Pan-STARRS 2	·	1.5 km	MPC · JPL
895132	2019 RK_{9}	—	September 4, 2019	Haleakala	Pan-STARRS 1	·	670 m	MPC · JPL
895133	2019 RD_{10}	—	September 4, 2019	Mount Lemmon	Mount Lemmon Survey	·	1.6 km	MPC · JPL
895134	2019 RM_{15}	—	September 9, 2008	Mount Lemmon	Mount Lemmon Survey	·	1.7 km	MPC · JPL
895135	2019 RX_{17}	—	November 25, 2014	Haleakala	Pan-STARRS 1	·	1.4 km	MPC · JPL
895136	2019 RV_{18}	—	September 10, 2019	Haleakala	Pan-STARRS 1	·	1.9 km	MPC · JPL
895137	2019 RJ_{23}	—	September 4, 2019	Mount Lemmon	Mount Lemmon Survey	H	410 m	MPC · JPL
895138	2019 RY_{37}	—	September 4, 2019	Mount Lemmon	Mount Lemmon Survey	·	1.8 km	MPC · JPL
895139	2019 RP_{42}	—	November 21, 2014	Haleakala	Pan-STARRS 1	·	1.5 km	MPC · JPL
895140	2019 RO_{48}	—	September 6, 2019	Haleakala	Pan-STARRS 1	·	1.8 km	MPC · JPL
895141	2019 RV_{57}	—	September 3, 2019	Mount Lemmon	Mount Lemmon Survey	·	1.4 km	MPC · JPL
895142	2019 RL_{59}	—	September 3, 2019	Mount Lemmon	Mount Lemmon Survey	·	1.4 km	MPC · JPL
895143	2019 RS_{59}	—	September 4, 2019	Mount Lemmon	Mount Lemmon Survey	·	1.0 km	MPC · JPL
895144	2019 RU_{62}	—	September 7, 2019	Mount Lemmon	Mount Lemmon Survey	H	310 m	MPC · JPL
895145	2019 RP_{70}	—	September 4, 2019	Haleakala	Pan-STARRS 1	H	270 m	MPC · JPL
895146	2019 RW_{80}	—	September 3, 2019	Mount Lemmon	Mount Lemmon Survey	·	1.2 km	MPC · JPL
895147	2019 RZ_{92}	—	September 5, 2019	Mount Lemmon	Mount Lemmon Survey	·	1.6 km	MPC · JPL
895148	2019 RD_{118}	—	September 6, 2019	Haleakala	Pan-STARRS 1	·	1.7 km	MPC · JPL
895149	2019 SS_{6}	—	July 3, 2016	Mount Lemmon	Mount Lemmon Survey	H	430 m	MPC · JPL
895150	2019 SZ_{7}	—	March 14, 2013	Catalina	CSS	H	360 m	MPC · JPL
895151	2019 SQ_{28}	—	September 25, 2019	Haleakala	Pan-STARRS 1	·	450 m	MPC · JPL
895152	2019 SK_{29}	—	September 28, 2019	Mount Lemmon	Mount Lemmon Survey	·	1.0 km	MPC · JPL
895153	2019 SE_{36}	—	September 20, 2019	Mount Lemmon	Mount Lemmon Survey	H	350 m	MPC · JPL
895154	2019 SV_{37}	—	September 26, 2019	Haleakala	Pan-STARRS 1	·	1.4 km	MPC · JPL
895155	2019 SL_{42}	—	October 2, 2008	Kitt Peak	Spacewatch	·	1.5 km	MPC · JPL
895156	2019 SS_{46}	—	September 23, 2008	Mount Lemmon	Mount Lemmon Survey	·	2.1 km	MPC · JPL
895157	2019 SG_{58}	—	September 27, 2019	Haleakala	Pan-STARRS 1	·	1.8 km	MPC · JPL
895158	2019 SR_{68}	—	September 18, 2019	Haleakala	Pan-STARRS 1	·	1.6 km	MPC · JPL
895159	2019 SB_{70}	—	September 6, 2008	Mount Lemmon	Mount Lemmon Survey	·	1.6 km	MPC · JPL
895160	2019 SC_{89}	—	September 25, 2019	Haleakala	Pan-STARRS 1	·	1.6 km	MPC · JPL
895161	2019 SK_{94}	—	September 22, 2019	Mount Lemmon	Mount Lemmon Survey	·	1.1 km	MPC · JPL
895162	2019 SR_{94}	—	March 4, 2017	Haleakala	Pan-STARRS 1	EOS	1.3 km	MPC · JPL
895163	2019 SO_{101}	—	September 26, 2019	Haleakala	Pan-STARRS 1	·	2.0 km	MPC · JPL
895164	2019 SD_{118}	—	December 28, 2014	Mount Lemmon	Mount Lemmon Survey	·	1.9 km	MPC · JPL
895165	2019 SL_{118}	—	May 18, 2018	Mount Lemmon	Mount Lemmon Survey	KON	1.4 km	MPC · JPL
895166	2019 SN_{129}	—	September 17, 2019	Haleakala	Pan-STARRS 1	·	1.7 km	MPC · JPL
895167	2019 SW_{134}	—	September 27, 2019	Haleakala	Pan-STARRS 1	·	1.4 km	MPC · JPL
895168	2019 SC_{138}	—	September 29, 2019	Mount Lemmon	Mount Lemmon Survey	·	1.9 km	MPC · JPL
895169	2019 SA_{144}	—	September 28, 2019	Mount Lemmon	Mount Lemmon Survey	·	1.9 km	MPC · JPL
895170	2019 SB_{149}	—	September 28, 2019	Mount Lemmon	Mount Lemmon Survey	·	2.0 km	MPC · JPL
895171	2019 SY_{153}	—	September 27, 2019	Haleakala	Pan-STARRS 1	·	2.1 km	MPC · JPL
895172	2019 SM_{155}	—	September 24, 2019	Haleakala	Pan-STARRS 1	·	1.4 km	MPC · JPL
895173	2019 SW_{156}	—	September 25, 2019	Haleakala	Pan-STARRS 1	MAR	530 m	MPC · JPL
895174	2019 SD_{157}	—	May 20, 2015	Haleakala	Pan-STARRS 1	·	440 m	MPC · JPL
895175	2019 SN_{157}	—	September 26, 2019	Haleakala	Pan-STARRS 1	·	1.7 km	MPC · JPL
895176	2019 SS_{157}	—	September 27, 2019	Haleakala	Pan-STARRS 1	·	1.8 km	MPC · JPL
895177	2019 SX_{183}	—	January 26, 2006	Mount Lemmon	Mount Lemmon Survey	·	1.4 km	MPC · JPL
895178	2019 SX_{184}	—	September 29, 2019	Haleakala	Pan-STARRS 1	·	1.2 km	MPC · JPL
895179	2019 SN_{188}	—	February 25, 2007	Mount Lemmon	Mount Lemmon Survey	·	900 m	MPC · JPL
895180	2019 SU_{188}	—	September 29, 2019	Mount Lemmon	Mount Lemmon Survey	·	1.4 km	MPC · JPL
895181	2019 SB_{190}	—	September 22, 2019	Mount Lemmon	Mount Lemmon Survey	·	1.1 km	MPC · JPL
895182	2019 SE_{192}	—	September 29, 2019	Haleakala	Pan-STARRS 1	·	1.4 km	MPC · JPL
895183	2019 SS_{193}	—	September 29, 2019	Haleakala	Pan-STARRS 1	·	1.2 km	MPC · JPL
895184	2019 SZ_{193}	—	September 20, 2019	Mount Lemmon	Mount Lemmon Survey	·	980 m	MPC · JPL
895185	2019 SA_{206}	—	January 13, 2002	Kitt Peak	Spacewatch	·	1.5 km	MPC · JPL
895186	2019 ST_{250}	—	September 28, 2019	Mount Lemmon	Mount Lemmon Survey	·	1.2 km	MPC · JPL
895187	2019 ST_{273}	—	September 25, 2019	Haleakala	Pan-STARRS 1	L4	6.0 km	MPC · JPL
895188	2019 TW_{2}	—	January 12, 2018	Mount Lemmon	Mount Lemmon Survey	H	330 m	MPC · JPL
895189	2019 TG_{6}	—	October 7, 2019	Haleakala	Pan-STARRS 1	AMO	190 m	MPC · JPL
895190	2019 TJ_{9}	—	October 6, 2019	Haleakala	Pan-STARRS 1	·	930 m	MPC · JPL
895191	2019 TK_{10}	—	February 10, 2016	Haleakala	Pan-STARRS 1	·	1.2 km	MPC · JPL
895192	2019 TK_{13}	—	October 1, 2019	Haleakala	Pan-STARRS 1	T_{j} (2.99) · EUP	2.1 km	MPC · JPL
895193	2019 TY_{13}	—	October 9, 2019	Mount Lemmon	Mount Lemmon Survey	·	980 m	MPC · JPL
895194	2019 TZ_{21}	—	October 5, 2019	Haleakala	Pan-STARRS 2	·	600 m	MPC · JPL
895195	2019 TO_{22}	—	November 30, 2003	Kitt Peak	Spacewatch	·	1.4 km	MPC · JPL
895196	2019 TX_{26}	—	September 6, 2008	Kitt Peak	Spacewatch	·	1.4 km	MPC · JPL
895197	2019 TH_{33}	—	October 5, 2019	Haleakala	Pan-STARRS 1	·	2.3 km	MPC · JPL
895198	2019 TO_{35}	—	October 11, 2019	Mount Lemmon	Mount Lemmon Survey	·	2.0 km	MPC · JPL
895199	2019 TW_{37}	—	October 5, 2019	Haleakala	Pan-STARRS 1	EOS	1.2 km	MPC · JPL
895200	2019 TH_{56}	—	October 8, 2019	Mount Lemmon	Mount Lemmon Survey	·	980 m	MPC · JPL

== 895201–895300 ==
back to top

Designation			Discovery			Properties		Ref
Permanent	Provisional	Named after	Date	Site	Discoverer(s)	Category	Diam.	Ref
895201	2019 TG_{62}	—	October 5, 2019	Haleakala	Pan-STARRS 2	·	1.6 km	MPC · JPL
895202	2019 TD_{75}	—	October 5, 2019	Haleakala	Pan-STARRS 1	·	1.3 km	MPC · JPL
895203	2019 TN_{75}	—	October 5, 2019	Mount Lemmon	Mount Lemmon Survey	H	360 m	MPC · JPL
895204	2019 TC_{80}	—	October 3, 2019	Mount Lemmon	Mount Lemmon Survey	·	1.1 km	MPC · JPL
895205	2019 TC_{90}	—	October 5, 2019	Haleakala	Pan-STARRS 1	·	2.1 km	MPC · JPL
895206	2019 TY_{107}	—	November 23, 2014	Mount Lemmon	Mount Lemmon Survey	·	1.6 km	MPC · JPL
895207	2019 UF_{2}	—	November 24, 2011	Haleakala	Pan-STARRS 1	H	330 m	MPC · JPL
895208	2019 UA_{6}	—	October 21, 2019	Haleakala	Pan-STARRS 1	AMO	240 m	MPC · JPL
895209	2019 UU_{10}	—	October 8, 2019	Mount Lemmon	Mount Lemmon Survey	H	360 m	MPC · JPL
895210	2019 UZ_{16}	—	November 27, 2014	Haleakala	Pan-STARRS 1	EOS	1.2 km	MPC · JPL
895211	2019 UE_{18}	—	November 21, 2014	Mount Lemmon	Mount Lemmon Survey	·	1.2 km	MPC · JPL
895212	2019 UA_{27}	—	November 20, 2014	Mount Lemmon	Mount Lemmon Survey	·	1.6 km	MPC · JPL
895213	2019 UF_{27}	—	October 24, 2019	Haleakala	Pan-STARRS 1	·	2.2 km	MPC · JPL
895214	2019 UZ_{28}	—	November 26, 2014	Haleakala	Pan-STARRS 1	·	1.8 km	MPC · JPL
895215	2019 UE_{48}	—	December 29, 2014	Haleakala	Pan-STARRS 1	·	2.0 km	MPC · JPL
895216	2019 UD_{49}	—	October 20, 2019	Mount Lemmon	Mount Lemmon Survey	·	1.7 km	MPC · JPL
895217	2019 UJ_{53}	—	October 25, 2019	Mount Lemmon	Mount Lemmon Survey	·	1.6 km	MPC · JPL
895218	2019 UV_{55}	—	December 11, 2014	Mount Lemmon	Mount Lemmon Survey	·	1.3 km	MPC · JPL
895219	2019 UN_{56}	—	April 20, 2017	Haleakala	Pan-STARRS 1	HOF	1.9 km	MPC · JPL
895220	2019 UT_{56}	—	January 16, 2015	Haleakala	Pan-STARRS 1	·	2.0 km	MPC · JPL
895221	2019 UW_{56}	—	January 19, 2015	Haleakala	Pan-STARRS 1	(895)	2.3 km	MPC · JPL
895222	2019 UA_{57}	—	October 20, 2019	Mount Lemmon	Mount Lemmon Survey	·	1.4 km	MPC · JPL
895223	2019 UM_{61}	—	August 15, 2013	Haleakala	Pan-STARRS 1	·	1.4 km	MPC · JPL
895224	2019 UO_{82}	—	October 23, 2019	Haleakala	Pan-STARRS 1	·	470 m	MPC · JPL
895225	2019 UR_{84}	—	January 17, 2015	Haleakala	Pan-STARRS 1	·	2.6 km	MPC · JPL
895226	2019 UK_{101}	—	October 22, 2019	Mount Lemmon	Mount Lemmon Survey	·	1.5 km	MPC · JPL
895227	2019 UU_{103}	—	October 25, 2019	Haleakala	Pan-STARRS 1	H	390 m	MPC · JPL
895228	2019 UG_{105}	—	October 25, 2019	Haleakala	Pan-STARRS 1	·	1.7 km	MPC · JPL
895229	2019 UV_{115}	—	May 1, 2016	Cerro Tololo-DECam	DECam	·	1.5 km	MPC · JPL
895230	2019 UE_{116}	—	September 29, 2008	Mauna Kea	P. A. Wiegert	·	1.7 km	MPC · JPL
895231	2019 UM_{116}	—	October 24, 2019	Haleakala	Pan-STARRS 1	H	280 m	MPC · JPL
895232	2019 UP_{119}	—	October 24, 2019	Mount Lemmon	Mount Lemmon Survey	·	1.5 km	MPC · JPL
895233	2019 UY_{123}	—	October 25, 2019	Haleakala	Pan-STARRS 1	·	2.0 km	MPC · JPL
895234	2019 UD_{124}	—	May 3, 2005	Kitt Peak	Spacewatch	H	300 m	MPC · JPL
895235	2019 UM_{124}	—	October 21, 2019	Haleakala	Pan-STARRS 1	·	2.1 km	MPC · JPL
895236	2019 UT_{126}	—	October 31, 2019	Haleakala	Pan-STARRS 1	·	1.4 km	MPC · JPL
895237	2019 UR_{136}	—	October 24, 2019	Haleakala	Pan-STARRS 1	·	1.8 km	MPC · JPL
895238	2019 UR_{137}	—	October 20, 2019	Mount Lemmon	Mount Lemmon Survey	·	450 m	MPC · JPL
895239	2019 UE_{153}	—	October 31, 2019	Haleakala	Pan-STARRS 2	·	1.2 km	MPC · JPL
895240	2019 UV_{174}	—	October 24, 2019	Haleakala	Pan-STARRS 1	VER	1.9 km	MPC · JPL
895241	2019 UU_{195}	—	December 16, 2015	Mount Lemmon	Mount Lemmon Survey	·	1.5 km	MPC · JPL
895242	2019 UQ_{198}	—	October 26, 2019	Haleakala	Pan-STARRS 1	·	1.2 km	MPC · JPL
895243	2019 UX_{198}	—	October 23, 2019	Haleakala	Pan-STARRS 1	·	1.2 km	MPC · JPL
895244	2019 VY_{11}	—	November 4, 2019	Haleakala	Pan-STARRS 1	·	1.6 km	MPC · JPL
895245	2019 VS_{13}	—	March 12, 2010	Kitt Peak	Spacewatch	·	1.5 km	MPC · JPL
895246	2019 VT_{13}	—	January 13, 2015	Haleakala	Pan-STARRS 1	·	2.0 km	MPC · JPL
895247	2019 VN_{16}	—	April 30, 2016	Haleakala	Pan-STARRS 1	·	1.6 km	MPC · JPL
895248	2019 VC_{24}	—	November 4, 2019	Haleakala	Pan-STARRS 1	·	1.5 km	MPC · JPL
895249	2019 VZ_{24}	—	January 29, 2015	Haleakala	Pan-STARRS 1	EUP	2.1 km	MPC · JPL
895250	2019 VG_{25}	—	November 5, 2019	Mount Lemmon	Mount Lemmon Survey	·	2.2 km	MPC · JPL
895251	2019 VL_{25}	—	November 3, 2019	Haleakala	Pan-STARRS 1	·	1.9 km	MPC · JPL
895252	2019 VL_{30}	—	November 4, 2019	Mount Lemmon	Mount Lemmon Survey	·	1.7 km	MPC · JPL
895253	2019 VF_{31}	—	April 19, 2015	Cerro Tololo-DECam	DECam	·	770 m	MPC · JPL
895254	2019 VH_{37}	—	January 1, 2009	Mount Lemmon	Mount Lemmon Survey	H	390 m	MPC · JPL
895255	2019 WK_{8}	—	November 27, 2019	Haleakala	Pan-STARRS 2	·	2.1 km	MPC · JPL
895256	2019 WZ_{9}	—	November 29, 2013	Kitt Peak	Spacewatch	TIR	2.3 km	MPC · JPL
895257	2019 WZ_{12}	—	November 19, 2019	Mount Lemmon	Mount Lemmon Survey	·	2.5 km	MPC · JPL
895258	2019 WE_{15}	—	November 24, 2019	Mount Lemmon	Mount Lemmon Survey	BAR	1.0 km	MPC · JPL
895259	2019 WF_{16}	—	November 26, 2019	Haleakala	Pan-STARRS 1	·	1.7 km	MPC · JPL
895260	2019 WM_{18}	—	January 20, 2015	Haleakala	Pan-STARRS 1	·	2.1 km	MPC · JPL
895261	2019 WH_{21}	—	November 18, 2019	Mount Lemmon	Mount Lemmon Survey	·	1.9 km	MPC · JPL
895262	2019 WS_{21}	—	January 20, 2015	Haleakala	Pan-STARRS 1	·	1.8 km	MPC · JPL
895263	2019 WZ_{21}	—	January 18, 2015	Haleakala	Pan-STARRS 1	·	1.8 km	MPC · JPL
895264	2019 WR_{24}	—	October 4, 2016	Mount Lemmon	Mount Lemmon Survey	H	390 m	MPC · JPL
895265	2019 WX_{41}	—	November 27, 2019	Haleakala	Pan-STARRS 1	·	2.3 km	MPC · JPL
895266	2019 WK_{43}	—	November 25, 2019	Haleakala	Pan-STARRS 1	·	1.4 km	MPC · JPL
895267	2019 XW_{2}	—	December 7, 2019	ATLAS-HKO, Haleaka	ATLAS	APO · PHA	380 m	MPC · JPL
895268	2019 XF_{6}	—	December 3, 2019	Haleakala	Pan-STARRS 1	·	1.3 km	MPC · JPL
895269	2019 XT_{7}	—	December 29, 2014	Haleakala	Pan-STARRS 1	·	2.0 km	MPC · JPL
895270	2019 XB_{8}	—	January 24, 2012	Haleakala	Pan-STARRS 1	·	770 m	MPC · JPL
895271	2019 XN_{9}	—	January 15, 2015	Haleakala	Pan-STARRS 1	·	1.9 km	MPC · JPL
895272	2019 XB_{12}	—	January 19, 2015	Haleakala	Pan-STARRS 1	·	1.7 km	MPC · JPL
895273	2019 XG_{12}	—	October 18, 2007	Kitt Peak	Spacewatch	·	1.9 km	MPC · JPL
895274	2019 XA_{14}	—	December 29, 2014	Mount Lemmon	Mount Lemmon Survey	LIX	2.6 km	MPC · JPL
895275	2019 XJ_{14}	—	December 2, 2019	Mount Lemmon	Mount Lemmon Survey	·	1.6 km	MPC · JPL
895276	2019 XS_{14}	—	December 8, 2019	Haleakala	Pan-STARRS 2	·	2.3 km	MPC · JPL
895277	2019 XD_{15}	—	March 6, 2016	Haleakala	Pan-STARRS 1	EOS	1.2 km	MPC · JPL
895278	2019 XS_{16}	—	December 2, 2019	Mount Lemmon	Mount Lemmon Survey	·	2.0 km	MPC · JPL
895279	2019 YR_{9}	—	December 24, 2019	Haleakala	Pan-STARRS 1	·	840 m	MPC · JPL
895280	2019 YO_{10}	—	December 28, 2019	Haleakala	Pan-STARRS 1	·	2.0 km	MPC · JPL
895281	2019 YT_{10}	—	December 20, 2019	Mount Lemmon	Mount Lemmon Survey	·	2.2 km	MPC · JPL
895282	2019 YN_{11}	—	December 20, 2019	Mount Lemmon	Mount Lemmon Survey	·	590 m	MPC · JPL
895283	2019 YC_{12}	—	December 24, 2019	Haleakala	Pan-STARRS 1	·	1.9 km	MPC · JPL
895284	2019 YU_{14}	—	December 28, 2019	Haleakala	Pan-STARRS 1	·	1.9 km	MPC · JPL
895285	2019 YU_{17}	—	December 28, 2019	Haleakala	Pan-STARRS 1	·	2.0 km	MPC · JPL
895286	2019 YH_{18}	—	February 23, 2015	Haleakala	Pan-STARRS 1	·	2.0 km	MPC · JPL
895287	2019 YR_{18}	—	December 28, 2019	Haleakala	Pan-STARRS 1	·	2.0 km	MPC · JPL
895288	2019 YT_{20}	—	January 25, 2015	Haleakala	Pan-STARRS 1	·	1.6 km	MPC · JPL
895289	2019 YT_{21}	—	February 25, 2015	Haleakala	Pan-STARRS 1	·	1.9 km	MPC · JPL
895290	2019 YX_{21}	—	December 29, 2014	Haleakala	Pan-STARRS 1	·	1.8 km	MPC · JPL
895291	2019 YF_{22}	—	August 13, 2018	Haleakala	Pan-STARRS 1	(895)	2.0 km	MPC · JPL
895292	2019 YR_{29}	—	December 28, 2019	Haleakala	Pan-STARRS 1	·	2.6 km	MPC · JPL
895293	2019 YX_{29}	—	December 30, 2019	Kitt Peak-Bok	Bok NEO Survey	·	2.1 km	MPC · JPL
895294	2019 YP_{33}	—	December 21, 2019	Mount Lemmon	Mount Lemmon Survey	·	1.3 km	MPC · JPL
895295	2019 YF_{34}	—	December 20, 2019	Mount Lemmon	Mount Lemmon Survey	·	2.4 km	MPC · JPL
895296	2019 YO_{39}	—	December 16, 2014	Haleakala	Pan-STARRS 1	·	1.5 km	MPC · JPL
895297	2019 YK_{41}	—	February 25, 2015	Haleakala	Pan-STARRS 1	·	1.8 km	MPC · JPL
895298	2019 YH_{44}	—	November 4, 2012	Kitt Peak	Spacewatch	·	370 m	MPC · JPL
895299	2019 YE_{58}	—	December 19, 2019	Mount Lemmon	Mount Lemmon Survey	·	1.8 km	MPC · JPL
895300	2020 AA_{4}	—	January 4, 2020	Mount Lemmon	Mount Lemmon Survey	T_{j} (2.97)	2.9 km	MPC · JPL

== 895301–895400 ==
back to top

Designation			Discovery			Properties		Ref
Permanent	Provisional	Named after	Date	Site	Discoverer(s)	Category	Diam.	Ref
895301	2020 AG_{5}	—	January 3, 2020	Mount Lemmon	Mount Lemmon Survey	·	2.1 km	MPC · JPL
895302	2020 AA_{7}	—	September 1, 2015	Cerro Tololo-DECam	DECam	·	440 m	MPC · JPL
895303	2020 AW_{9}	—	February 3, 2012	Mount Lemmon	Mount Lemmon Survey	·	1.0 km	MPC · JPL
895304	2020 AU_{11}	—	January 28, 2015	Haleakala	Pan-STARRS 1	·	2.1 km	MPC · JPL
895305	2020 AW_{11}	—	December 14, 2015	Haleakala	Pan-STARRS 1	·	790 m	MPC · JPL
895306	2020 AD_{21}	—	January 1, 2020	Haleakala	Pan-STARRS 1	T_{j} (2.99) · EUP	2.2 km	MPC · JPL
895307	2020 AO_{21}	—	January 17, 2015	Haleakala	Pan-STARRS 1	EOS	1.2 km	MPC · JPL
895308	2020 AH_{23}	—	January 4, 2020	Mount Lemmon	Mount Lemmon Survey	(895)	2.5 km	MPC · JPL
895309	2020 AD_{26}	—	January 14, 2020	Mount Lemmon	Mount Lemmon Survey	URS	2.2 km	MPC · JPL
895310	2020 AN_{29}	—	December 31, 2008	Kitt Peak	Spacewatch	·	690 m	MPC · JPL
895311	2020 AE_{31}	—	January 4, 2020	Mount Lemmon	Mount Lemmon Survey	·	1.8 km	MPC · JPL
895312	2020 BY_{20}	—	January 23, 2020	Haleakala	Pan-STARRS 1	·	1.7 km	MPC · JPL
895313	2020 BF_{22}	—	January 25, 2020	Haleakala	Pan-STARRS 1	·	2.6 km	MPC · JPL
895314	2020 BG_{23}	—	January 19, 2020	Mount Lemmon	Mount Lemmon Survey	·	2.6 km	MPC · JPL
895315	2020 BK_{24}	—	February 19, 2009	Kitt Peak	Spacewatch	·	1.9 km	MPC · JPL
895316	2020 BF_{29}	—	April 13, 2015	Haleakala	Pan-STARRS 1	·	1.8 km	MPC · JPL
895317	2020 BD_{33}	—	April 4, 2015	Haleakala	Pan-STARRS 1	·	1.9 km	MPC · JPL
895318	2020 BB_{35}	—	February 27, 2009	Kitt Peak	Spacewatch	THM	1.5 km	MPC · JPL
895319	2020 BD_{35}	—	November 11, 2013	Kitt Peak	Spacewatch	·	1.5 km	MPC · JPL
895320	2020 BZ_{36}	—	January 3, 2016	Haleakala	Pan-STARRS 1	NYS	890 m	MPC · JPL
895321	2020 BF_{37}	—	July 14, 2016	Haleakala	Pan-STARRS 1	·	2.0 km	MPC · JPL
895322	2020 BQ_{41}	—	February 16, 2015	Haleakala	Pan-STARRS 1	·	1.7 km	MPC · JPL
895323	2020 BE_{59}	—	January 23, 2020	Haleakala	Pan-STARRS 2	·	2.2 km	MPC · JPL
895324	2020 BP_{65}	—	January 23, 2020	Haleakala	Pan-STARRS 1	·	2.3 km	MPC · JPL
895325	2020 BQ_{66}	—	February 16, 2015	Haleakala	Pan-STARRS 1	VER	1.7 km	MPC · JPL
895326	2020 BY_{66}	—	January 19, 2020	Haleakala	Pan-STARRS 1	·	2.0 km	MPC · JPL
895327	2020 BL_{69}	—	March 22, 2015	Haleakala	Pan-STARRS 1	LIX	2.0 km	MPC · JPL
895328	2020 BQ_{73}	—	January 25, 2020	Haleakala	Pan-STARRS 2	·	2.0 km	MPC · JPL
895329	2020 BT_{73}	—	July 26, 2017	Haleakala	Pan-STARRS 1	VER	1.9 km	MPC · JPL
895330	2020 BP_{75}	—	January 21, 2020	Haleakala	Pan-STARRS 1	·	2.1 km	MPC · JPL
895331	2020 BZ_{75}	—	January 21, 2020	Haleakala	Pan-STARRS 1	·	2.1 km	MPC · JPL
895332	2020 BB_{76}	—	January 23, 2020	Mount Lemmon	Mount Lemmon Survey	T_{j} (2.96)	2.5 km	MPC · JPL
895333	2020 BC_{76}	—	January 21, 2020	Haleakala	Pan-STARRS 1	·	1.9 km	MPC · JPL
895334	2020 BH_{76}	—	January 19, 2020	Haleakala	Pan-STARRS 1	·	2.3 km	MPC · JPL
895335	2020 BN_{80}	—	January 24, 2020	Mount Lemmon	Mount Lemmon Survey	·	2.4 km	MPC · JPL
895336	2020 BL_{81}	—	January 19, 2020	Haleakala	Pan-STARRS 1	·	1.8 km	MPC · JPL
895337	2020 BO_{81}	—	January 19, 2020	Haleakala	Pan-STARRS 1	·	1.5 km	MPC · JPL
895338	2020 BB_{83}	—	January 19, 2020	Haleakala	Pan-STARRS 1	VER	2.0 km	MPC · JPL
895339	2020 BC_{83}	—	January 24, 2020	Haleakala	Pan-STARRS 1	·	2.0 km	MPC · JPL
895340	2020 BY_{83}	—	January 28, 2015	Haleakala	Pan-STARRS 1	·	2.0 km	MPC · JPL
895341	2020 BK_{91}	—	January 25, 2020	Haleakala	Pan-STARRS 1	·	940 m	MPC · JPL
895342	2020 BZ_{93}	—	August 22, 2017	Haleakala	Pan-STARRS 1	EOS	1.5 km	MPC · JPL
895343	2020 BO_{97}	—	November 8, 2013	Mount Lemmon	Mount Lemmon Survey	·	1.8 km	MPC · JPL
895344	2020 BR_{100}	—	January 23, 2020	Haleakala	Pan-STARRS 1	·	2.2 km	MPC · JPL
895345	2020 BG_{122}	—	January 21, 2020	Haleakala	Pan-STARRS 1	·	870 m	MPC · JPL
895346	2020 BS_{122}	—	March 4, 2016	Haleakala	Pan-STARRS 1	·	1.2 km	MPC · JPL
895347	2020 BB_{131}	—	August 11, 2018	Haleakala	Pan-STARRS 1	·	2.0 km	MPC · JPL
895348	2020 BT_{138}	—	January 23, 2020	Haleakala	Pan-STARRS 1	·	2.2 km	MPC · JPL
895349	2020 BR_{143}	—	August 10, 2007	Kitt Peak	Spacewatch	·	1.3 km	MPC · JPL
895350	2020 BF_{161}	—	January 22, 2020	Haleakala	Pan-STARRS 2	·	1.9 km	MPC · JPL
895351	2020 CL_{5}	—	August 1, 2016	Haleakala	Pan-STARRS 1	·	2.4 km	MPC · JPL
895352	2020 CZ_{6}	—	February 15, 2020	Mount Lemmon	Mount Lemmon Survey	·	2.0 km	MPC · JPL
895353	2020 CM_{10}	—	February 2, 2020	Mount Lemmon	Mount Lemmon Survey	·	2.3 km	MPC · JPL
895354	2020 CX_{10}	—	February 28, 2009	Kitt Peak	Spacewatch	·	950 m	MPC · JPL
895355	2020 DP_{5}	—	February 16, 2020	Mount Lemmon	Mount Lemmon Survey	THB	1.8 km	MPC · JPL
895356	2020 DF_{12}	—	February 27, 2020	Mount Lemmon	Mount Lemmon Survey	·	2.3 km	MPC · JPL
895357	2020 DO_{18}	—	February 16, 2020	Mount Lemmon	Mount Lemmon Survey	·	2.2 km	MPC · JPL
895358	2020 EN	—	March 5, 2020	Mount Lemmon	Mount Lemmon Survey	APO +1km · PHA	860 m	MPC · JPL
895359	2020 FW_{6}	—	March 29, 2020	Haleakala	Pan-STARRS 1	APO	80 m	MPC · JPL
895360	2020 FN_{11}	—	March 24, 2020	Haleakala	Pan-STARRS 1	·	460 m	MPC · JPL
895361	2020 FC_{17}	—	March 21, 2020	Haleakala	Pan-STARRS 1	·	510 m	MPC · JPL
895362	2020 FE_{18}	—	April 12, 2016	Haleakala	Pan-STARRS 1	·	620 m	MPC · JPL
895363	2020 FJ_{19}	—	May 2, 2016	Mount Lemmon	Mount Lemmon Survey	·	780 m	MPC · JPL
895364	2020 FV_{22}	—	May 1, 2017	Mount Lemmon	Mount Lemmon Survey	·	550 m	MPC · JPL
895365	2020 FX_{23}	—	March 24, 2020	Haleakala	Pan-STARRS 1	·	570 m	MPC · JPL
895366	2020 FX_{35}	—	April 11, 2016	Haleakala	Pan-STARRS 1	MAR	520 m	MPC · JPL
895367	2020 GJ_{5}	—	April 2, 2020	Haleakala	Pan-STARRS 1	·	420 m	MPC · JPL
895368	2020 GR_{15}	—	April 15, 2020	Mount Lemmon	Mount Lemmon Survey	·	1.4 km	MPC · JPL
895369	2020 GN_{16}	—	April 16, 2016	Haleakala	Pan-STARRS 1	·	810 m	MPC · JPL
895370	2020 GE_{24}	—	April 2, 2020	Haleakala	Pan-STARRS 1	·	490 m	MPC · JPL
895371	2020 GJ_{24}	—	November 1, 2018	Mount Lemmon	Mount Lemmon Survey	·	480 m	MPC · JPL
895372	2020 GE_{25}	—	October 16, 2018	Haleakala	Pan-STARRS 2	·	480 m	MPC · JPL
895373	2020 GC_{28}	—	April 3, 2020	Mount Lemmon	Mount Lemmon Survey	·	710 m	MPC · JPL
895374	2020 GM_{32}	—	April 13, 2020	Mount Lemmon	Mount Lemmon Survey	EUP	2.7 km	MPC · JPL
895375	2020 HG_{10}	—	October 5, 2016	Mount Lemmon	Mount Lemmon Survey	·	370 m	MPC · JPL
895376	2020 HN_{16}	—	April 15, 2016	Haleakala	Pan-STARRS 1	·	990 m	MPC · JPL
895377	2020 HA_{50}	—	January 22, 2015	Haleakala	Pan-STARRS 1	·	960 m	MPC · JPL
895378	2020 HQ_{55}	—	April 21, 2020	Haleakala	Pan-STARRS 1	·	1.1 km	MPC · JPL
895379	2020 HJ_{68}	—	April 21, 2020	Haleakala	Pan-STARRS 1	·	570 m	MPC · JPL
895380	2020 HM_{70}	—	April 19, 2020	Haleakala	Pan-STARRS 1	·	1.2 km	MPC · JPL
895381	2020 HW_{97}	—	November 22, 2014	Mount Lemmon	Mount Lemmon Survey	L5	6.9 km	MPC · JPL
895382	2020 HQ_{100}	—	April 21, 2020	Haleakala	Pan-STARRS 1	·	1.2 km	MPC · JPL
895383	2020 HV_{116}	—	April 22, 2020	Haleakala	Pan-STARRS 1	L5	6.2 km	MPC · JPL
895384	2020 HZ_{118}	—	April 16, 2020	Mount Lemmon	Mount Lemmon Survey	·	940 m	MPC · JPL
895385	2020 HG_{154}	—	September 23, 2017	Haleakala	Pan-STARRS 1	HOF	1.6 km	MPC · JPL
895386	2020 JN_{10}	—	August 6, 2008	Siding Spring	SSS	·	900 m	MPC · JPL
895387	2020 JC_{19}	—	August 8, 2016	Haleakala	Pan-STARRS 1	·	1.4 km	MPC · JPL
895388	2020 KE_{1}	—	September 18, 2018	Mount Lemmon	Mount Lemmon Survey	H	300 m	MPC · JPL
895389	2020 KH_{4}	—	May 22, 2020	WISE	WISE	·	1.8 km	MPC · JPL
895390	2020 KT_{16}	—	September 2, 2017	Mount Lemmon	Mount Lemmon Survey	·	420 m	MPC · JPL
895391	2020 KK_{17}	—	July 22, 2016	Haleakala	Pan-STARRS 1	·	1.2 km	MPC · JPL
895392	2020 KA_{21}	—	July 13, 2016	Haleakala	Pan-STARRS 1	·	1.5 km	MPC · JPL
895393	2020 KY_{25}	—	May 18, 2020	Haleakala	Pan-STARRS 1	·	1.5 km	MPC · JPL
895394	2020 KZ_{34}	—	January 16, 2015	Haleakala	Pan-STARRS 1	·	1.1 km	MPC · JPL
895395	2020 KT_{48}	—	May 21, 2020	Haleakala	Pan-STARRS 1	·	1.0 km	MPC · JPL
895396	2020 LL_{4}	—	June 15, 2020	Haleakala	Pan-STARRS 2	·	540 m	MPC · JPL
895397	2020 LO_{14}	—	April 21, 2015	Cerro Tololo-DECam	DECam	·	1.1 km	MPC · JPL
895398	2020 LY_{15}	—	June 15, 2020	Haleakala	Pan-STARRS 1	(1118)	2.2 km	MPC · JPL
895399	2020 LJ_{17}	—	June 15, 2020	Haleakala	Pan-STARRS 1	·	1.2 km	MPC · JPL
895400	2020 MY_{6}	—	January 15, 2018	Haleakala	Pan-STARRS 1	·	1.2 km	MPC · JPL

== 895401–895500 ==
back to top

Designation			Discovery			Properties		Ref
Permanent	Provisional	Named after	Date	Site	Discoverer(s)	Category	Diam.	Ref
895401	2020 MQ_{9}	—	June 29, 2020	Haleakala	Pan-STARRS 1	·	1.6 km	MPC · JPL
895402	2020 MO_{18}	—	June 27, 2020	Haleakala	Pan-STARRS 1	·	2.4 km	MPC · JPL
895403	2020 MX_{37}	—	June 29, 2020	Haleakala	Pan-STARRS 1	·	1.8 km	MPC · JPL
895404	2020 MS_{47}	—	November 24, 2017	Haleakala	Pan-STARRS 1	·	890 m	MPC · JPL
895405	2020 MV_{48}	—	June 28, 2020	Haleakala	Pan-STARRS 1	MAR	720 m	MPC · JPL
895406	2020 MJ_{54}	—	February 3, 2012	Haleakala	Pan-STARRS 1	·	610 m	MPC · JPL
895407	2020 ME_{61}	—	June 24, 2020	Haleakala	Pan-STARRS 2	·	1.4 km	MPC · JPL
895408	2020 MJ_{61}	—	July 5, 2016	Mount Lemmon	Mount Lemmon Survey	·	950 m	MPC · JPL
895409	2020 OR_{17}	—	June 29, 2020	Haleakala	Pan-STARRS 1	·	880 m	MPC · JPL
895410	2020 OM_{34}	—	July 18, 2020	Haleakala	Pan-STARRS 1	·	800 m	MPC · JPL
895411	2020 OF_{47}	—	July 30, 2020	Haleakala	Pan-STARRS 1	·	970 m	MPC · JPL
895412	2020 OY_{64}	—	July 25, 2020	Haleakala	Pan-STARRS 1	EUN	1.0 km	MPC · JPL
895413	2020 OM_{84}	—	July 30, 2020	Haleakala	Pan-STARRS 1	L4 · ERY	5.4 km	MPC · JPL
895414	2020 OT_{86}	—	July 19, 2020	Haleakala	Pan-STARRS 1	V	460 m	MPC · JPL
895415	2020 OD_{92}	—	July 17, 2020	Haleakala	Pan-STARRS 1	EOS	1.0 km	MPC · JPL
895416	2020 OR_{92}	—	July 18, 2020	Haleakala	Pan-STARRS 1	·	1.2 km	MPC · JPL
895417	2020 OO_{106}	—	July 28, 2020	Haleakala	Pan-STARRS 1	·	770 m	MPC · JPL
895418	2020 OU_{111}	—	July 23, 2020	Haleakala	Pan-STARRS 1	EOS	1.3 km	MPC · JPL
895419	2020 OE_{115}	—	July 22, 2020	Haleakala	Pan-STARRS 1	·	2.1 km	MPC · JPL
895420	2020 OU_{115}	—	November 3, 2016	Haleakala	Pan-STARRS 1	526	1.2 km	MPC · JPL
895421	2020 PY_{16}	—	August 15, 2020	Haleakala	Pan-STARRS 1	·	710 m	MPC · JPL
895422	2020 PQ_{17}	—	August 14, 2020	Haleakala	Pan-STARRS 1	·	770 m	MPC · JPL
895423	2020 PM_{29}	—	August 1, 2020	Mount Lemmon	Mount Lemmon Survey	H	320 m	MPC · JPL
895424	2020 PB_{34}	—	April 29, 2014	Cerro Tololo-DECam	DECam	·	1.2 km	MPC · JPL
895425	2020 PY_{39}	—	August 2, 2020	Mount Lemmon	Mount Lemmon Survey	·	1.2 km	MPC · JPL
895426	2020 PS_{54}	—	February 14, 2012	Haleakala	Pan-STARRS 1	EOS	1.3 km	MPC · JPL
895427	2020 PT_{55}	—	August 14, 2020	Haleakala	Pan-STARRS 1	·	1.8 km	MPC · JPL
895428	2020 PD_{75}	—	August 14, 2020	Haleakala	Pan-STARRS 1	L4	7.3 km	MPC · JPL
895429	2020 PQ_{75}	—	August 14, 2020	Haleakala	Pan-STARRS 1	L4	5.1 km	MPC · JPL
895430	2020 PP_{77}	—	August 14, 2020	Haleakala	Pan-STARRS 1	·	2.5 km	MPC · JPL
895431	2020 PD_{79}	—	August 13, 2020	Haleakala	Pan-STARRS 2	·	700 m	MPC · JPL
895432	2020 PE_{79}	—	February 17, 2018	Mount Lemmon	Mount Lemmon Survey	·	810 m	MPC · JPL
895433	2020 PK_{79}	—	August 12, 2020	Haleakala	Pan-STARRS 1	·	870 m	MPC · JPL
895434	2020 PP_{80}	—	September 12, 2016	Haleakala	Pan-STARRS 1	·	760 m	MPC · JPL
895435	2020 PT_{83}	—	August 13, 2020	Haleakala	Pan-STARRS 1	·	1.7 km	MPC · JPL
895436	2020 PP_{96}	—	August 15, 2020	Haleakala	Pan-STARRS 2	·	600 m	MPC · JPL
895437	2020 PW_{116}	—	August 12, 2020	Haleakala	Pan-STARRS 1	·	1.1 km	MPC · JPL
895438	2020 QL_{6}	—	August 25, 2020	Haleakala	Pan-STARRS 2	AMO	490 m	MPC · JPL
895439	2020 QS_{7}	—	August 19, 2020	Haleakala	Pan-STARRS 1	·	230 m	MPC · JPL
895440	2020 QL_{14}	—	August 18, 2020	Haleakala	Pan-STARRS 1	·	840 m	MPC · JPL
895441	2020 QE_{16}	—	August 23, 2020	Haleakala	Pan-STARRS 1	·	1.0 km	MPC · JPL
895442	2020 QV_{23}	—	August 23, 2020	Haleakala	Pan-STARRS 1	·	1.1 km	MPC · JPL
895443	2020 QP_{25}	—	August 23, 2020	Haleakala	Pan-STARRS 1	(5)	840 m	MPC · JPL
895444	2020 QF_{26}	—	August 14, 2020	Haleakala	Pan-STARRS 1	·	850 m	MPC · JPL
895445	2020 QN_{30}	—	August 18, 2020	Haleakala	Pan-STARRS 1	·	570 m	MPC · JPL
895446	2020 QC_{32}	—	August 16, 2020	Haleakala	Pan-STARRS 2	·	830 m	MPC · JPL
895447	2020 QS_{47}	—	August 27, 2020	Mount Lemmon	Mount Lemmon Survey	·	1.3 km	MPC · JPL
895448	2020 QK_{53}	—	August 23, 2020	Haleakala	Pan-STARRS 1	·	1.4 km	MPC · JPL
895449	2020 QP_{64}	—	August 23, 2020	Haleakala	Pan-STARRS 1	·	960 m	MPC · JPL
895450	2020 QF_{67}	—	August 18, 2020	Haleakala	Pan-STARRS 1	·	2.5 km	MPC · JPL
895451	2020 QQ_{67}	—	August 13, 2020	Haleakala	Pan-STARRS 1	L4	6.3 km	MPC · JPL
895452	2020 QK_{86}	—	September 11, 2016	Mount Lemmon	Mount Lemmon Survey	·	1.1 km	MPC · JPL
895453	2020 QH_{87}	—	August 18, 2020	Haleakala	Pan-STARRS 1	MAR	640 m	MPC · JPL
895454	2020 QQ_{88}	—	August 16, 2020	Haleakala	Pan-STARRS 1	PHO	640 m	MPC · JPL
895455	2020 QF_{94}	—	August 19, 2020	Haleakala	Pan-STARRS 1	L4	5.7 km	MPC · JPL
895456	2020 QY_{108}	—	August 18, 2020	Haleakala	Pan-STARRS 1	HNS	770 m	MPC · JPL
895457	2020 QA_{114}	—	June 1, 2019	Haleakala	Pan-STARRS 1	·	1.7 km	MPC · JPL
895458	2020 QW_{117}	—	August 17, 2020	Haleakala	Pan-STARRS 1	L4	6.0 km	MPC · JPL
895459	2020 QO_{118}	—	October 21, 2011	Kitt Peak	Spacewatch	·	1.1 km	MPC · JPL
895460	2020 RL_{21}	—	September 12, 2020	Haleakala	Pan-STARRS 1	·	1.3 km	MPC · JPL
895461	2020 RG_{47}	—	September 14, 2020	Haleakala	Pan-STARRS 2	·	890 m	MPC · JPL
895462	2020 RX_{66}	—	September 10, 2020	Haleakala	Pan-STARRS 1	HNS	780 m	MPC · JPL
895463	2020 RQ_{69}	—	September 12, 2020	Haleakala	Pan-STARRS 1	·	860 m	MPC · JPL
895464	2020 RT_{79}	—	September 12, 2015	Haleakala	Pan-STARRS 1	EOS	1.3 km	MPC · JPL
895465	2020 RZ_{89}	—	September 21, 2011	Haleakala	Pan-STARRS 1	·	1.1 km	MPC · JPL
895466	2020 RG_{107}	—	April 24, 2014	Cerro Tololo-DECam	DECam	EUN	690 m	MPC · JPL
895467	2020 RW_{120}	—	September 9, 2020	Haleakala	Pan-STARRS 1	EOS	1.4 km	MPC · JPL
895468	2020 RO_{126}	—	November 5, 2016	Mount Lemmon	Mount Lemmon Survey	·	700 m	MPC · JPL
895469	2020 RU_{126}	—	April 2, 2006	Catalina	CSS	·	890 m	MPC · JPL
895470	2020 RL_{145}	—	January 7, 2017	Mount Lemmon	Mount Lemmon Survey	(1118)	2.6 km	MPC · JPL
895471	2020 RJ_{165}	—	October 7, 2016	Haleakala	Pan-STARRS 1	·	890 m	MPC · JPL
895472	2020 RB_{180}	—	September 12, 2020	Haleakala	Pan-STARRS 1	·	770 m	MPC · JPL
895473	2020 SG_{12}	—	September 17, 2020	Haleakala	Pan-STARRS 1	·	730 m	MPC · JPL
895474	2020 SV_{39}	—	April 28, 2014	Cerro Tololo-DECam	DECam	·	950 m	MPC · JPL
895475	2020 SE_{41}	—	April 23, 2014	Cerro Tololo-DECam	DECam	KON	1.5 km	MPC · JPL
895476	2020 SJ_{41}	—	September 29, 2020	Mount Lemmon	Mount Lemmon Survey	MAR	970 m	MPC · JPL
895477	2020 SU_{44}	—	September 17, 2020	Haleakala	Pan-STARRS 1	·	960 m	MPC · JPL
895478	2020 SC_{57}	—	December 9, 2016	Mount Lemmon	Mount Lemmon Survey	EUN	820 m	MPC · JPL
895479	2020 SQ_{61}	—	September 26, 2020	Haleakala	Pan-STARRS 1	MAR	710 m	MPC · JPL
895480	2020 SL_{63}	—	September 17, 2020	Haleakala	Pan-STARRS 1	·	980 m	MPC · JPL
895481	2020 SM_{64}	—	October 16, 2007	Kitt Peak	Spacewatch	·	910 m	MPC · JPL
895482	2020 SY_{65}	—	September 23, 2020	Haleakala	Pan-STARRS 1	·	1.0 km	MPC · JPL
895483	2020 SD_{69}	—	September 23, 2020	Mount Lemmon	Mount Lemmon Survey	·	790 m	MPC · JPL
895484	2020 SQ_{78}	—	September 17, 2020	Haleakala	Pan-STARRS 1	·	870 m	MPC · JPL
895485	2020 SX_{83}	—	August 13, 2020	Haleakala	Pan-STARRS 2	L4	5.9 km	MPC · JPL
895486	2020 SM_{84}	—	September 18, 2020	Haleakala	Pan-STARRS 1	L4	5.7 km	MPC · JPL
895487	2020 SD_{88}	—	September 20, 2020	Mount Lemmon	Mount Lemmon Survey	·	790 m	MPC · JPL
895488	2020 SJ_{88}	—	September 22, 2020	Mount Lemmon	Mount Lemmon Survey	·	760 m	MPC · JPL
895489	2020 SR_{88}	—	May 31, 2019	Haleakala	Pan-STARRS 1	·	920 m	MPC · JPL
895490	2020 SV_{88}	—	September 17, 2020	Haleakala	Pan-STARRS 1	HNS	750 m	MPC · JPL
895491	2020 SZ_{88}	—	August 30, 2016	Haleakala	Pan-STARRS 1	·	800 m	MPC · JPL
895492	2020 SM_{89}	—	September 17, 2020	Mount Lemmon	Mount Lemmon Survey	HNS	640 m	MPC · JPL
895493	2020 SQ_{90}	—	September 26, 2020	Haleakala	Pan-STARRS 1	·	700 m	MPC · JPL
895494	2020 SZ_{90}	—	September 26, 2020	Haleakala	Pan-STARRS 1	·	1.0 km	MPC · JPL
895495	2020 SP_{91}	—	September 18, 2020	Haleakala	Pan-STARRS 1	HNS	650 m	MPC · JPL
895496	2020 SH_{92}	—	September 28, 2020	Haleakala	Pan-STARRS 1	EUN	770 m	MPC · JPL
895497	2020 SO_{99}	—	September 17, 2020	Haleakala	Pan-STARRS 2	·	1.2 km	MPC · JPL
895498	2020 TW_{12}	—	December 3, 2012	Mount Lemmon	Mount Lemmon Survey	·	820 m	MPC · JPL
895499	2020 TK_{18}	—	October 14, 2020	Mount Lemmon	Mount Lemmon Survey	·	1.3 km	MPC · JPL
895500	2020 TG_{20}	—	December 5, 2007	Kitt Peak	Spacewatch	·	1.2 km	MPC · JPL

== 895501–895600 ==
back to top

Designation			Discovery			Properties		Ref
Permanent	Provisional	Named after	Date	Site	Discoverer(s)	Category	Diam.	Ref
895501	2020 TG_{21}	—	December 22, 2012	Haleakala	Pan-STARRS 1	·	940 m	MPC · JPL
895502	2020 TD_{26}	—	October 15, 2020	Haleakala	Pan-STARRS 1	MAR	630 m	MPC · JPL
895503	2020 TZ_{31}	—	October 13, 2020	Mount Lemmon	Mount Lemmon Survey	·	950 m	MPC · JPL
895504	2020 TA_{32}	—	October 13, 2020	Mount Lemmon	Mount Lemmon Survey	·	1.2 km	MPC · JPL
895505	2020 TU_{34}	—	October 14, 2020	Haleakala	Pan-STARRS 2	·	1.1 km	MPC · JPL
895506	2020 TZ_{52}	—	February 17, 2013	Mount Lemmon	Mount Lemmon Survey	·	1.1 km	MPC · JPL
895507	2020 TC_{55}	—	December 1, 2016	Mount Lemmon	Mount Lemmon Survey	·	900 m	MPC · JPL
895508	2020 TA_{70}	—	November 4, 2007	Kitt Peak	Spacewatch	·	1.0 km	MPC · JPL
895509	2020 TL_{72}	—	August 17, 1999	Kitt Peak	Spacewatch	KON	1.6 km	MPC · JPL
895510	2020 TQ_{77}	—	April 18, 2015	Cerro Tololo-DECam	DECam	L4	5.9 km	MPC · JPL
895511	2020 TP_{78}	—	October 11, 2020	Haleakala	Pan-STARRS 2	EUN	680 m	MPC · JPL
895512	2020 TU_{79}	—	April 29, 2014	Cerro Tololo-DECam	DECam	·	1.1 km	MPC · JPL
895513	2020 TB_{80}	—	November 2, 2008	Mount Lemmon	Mount Lemmon Survey	KON	1.5 km	MPC · JPL
895514	2020 TV_{81}	—	October 12, 2020	Mount Lemmon	Mount Lemmon Survey	·	940 m	MPC · JPL
895515	2020 TV_{82}	—	October 14, 2020	Mount Lemmon	Mount Lemmon Survey	·	740 m	MPC · JPL
895516	2020 UU_{8}	—	October 23, 2020	Haleakala	Pan-STARRS 1	·	1.6 km	MPC · JPL
895517	2020 UB_{9}	—	October 17, 2020	Mount Lemmon	Mount Lemmon Survey	·	930 m	MPC · JPL
895518	2020 UF_{9}	—	October 20, 2020	Haleakala	Pan-STARRS 1	·	900 m	MPC · JPL
895519	2020 UV_{12}	—	May 21, 2014	Haleakala	Pan-STARRS 1	GEF	810 m	MPC · JPL
895520	2020 US_{16}	—	October 20, 2020	Haleakala	Pan-STARRS 1	·	1.2 km	MPC · JPL
895521	2020 UD_{19}	—	October 29, 2020	Mount Lemmon	Mount Lemmon Survey	·	1.2 km	MPC · JPL
895522	2020 UH_{28}	—	October 20, 2020	Haleakala	Pan-STARRS 1	·	820 m	MPC · JPL
895523	2020 UW_{39}	—	April 23, 2014	Cerro Tololo-DECam	DECam	·	930 m	MPC · JPL
895524	2020 UH_{46}	—	October 17, 2020	Mount Lemmon	Mount Lemmon Survey	·	1.2 km	MPC · JPL
895525	2020 UN_{47}	—	October 20, 2020	Haleakala	Pan-STARRS 1	·	930 m	MPC · JPL
895526	2020 UL_{52}	—	October 10, 2007	Kitt Peak	Spacewatch	·	1.0 km	MPC · JPL
895527	2020 UY_{53}	—	October 23, 2020	Mount Lemmon	Mount Lemmon Survey	·	1.0 km	MPC · JPL
895528	2020 UP_{54}	—	October 18, 2011	Mount Lemmon	Mount Lemmon Survey	·	1.3 km	MPC · JPL
895529	2020 UB_{55}	—	October 16, 2020	Mount Lemmon	Mount Lemmon Survey	·	700 m	MPC · JPL
895530	2020 US_{55}	—	November 5, 2016	Mount Lemmon	Mount Lemmon Survey	·	1.0 km	MPC · JPL
895531	2020 UN_{57}	—	October 17, 2020	Mount Lemmon	Mount Lemmon Survey	·	1.7 km	MPC · JPL
895532	2020 UJ_{59}	—	October 20, 2020	Haleakala	Pan-STARRS 1	MAR	560 m	MPC · JPL
895533	2020 UV_{59}	—	October 20, 2020	Haleakala	Pan-STARRS 1	·	1.0 km	MPC · JPL
895534	2020 VR_{7}	—	February 16, 2013	Catalina	CSS	·	1.0 km	MPC · JPL
895535	2020 VG_{18}	—	November 14, 2020	Mount Lemmon	Mount Lemmon Survey	·	1.1 km	MPC · JPL
895536	2020 VE_{27}	—	November 8, 2020	Haleakala	Pan-STARRS 1	HNS	790 m	MPC · JPL
895537	2020 VQ_{28}	—	November 13, 2020	Haleakala	Pan-STARRS 1	EUN	770 m	MPC · JPL
895538	2020 VT_{28}	—	November 11, 2020	Mount Lemmon	Mount Lemmon Survey	·	1.2 km	MPC · JPL
895539	2020 VA_{34}	—	November 5, 2020	Mount Lemmon	Mount Lemmon Survey	·	1.3 km	MPC · JPL
895540	2020 VR_{37}	—	October 24, 2011	Haleakala	Pan-STARRS 1	·	1.3 km	MPC · JPL
895541	2020 WC_{6}	—	January 2, 2019	Haleakala	Pan-STARRS 1	H	480 m	MPC · JPL
895542	2020 WL_{6}	—	November 19, 2020	Haleakala	Pan-STARRS 1	·	1.1 km	MPC · JPL
895543	2020 WB_{8}	—	November 25, 2020	Haleakala	Pan-STARRS 1	H	300 m	MPC · JPL
895544	2020 WC_{11}	—	November 20, 2020	Mount Lemmon	Mount Lemmon Survey	H	370 m	MPC · JPL
895545	2020 WA_{14}	—	October 22, 2006	Kitt Peak	Spacewatch	·	1.1 km	MPC · JPL
895546	2020 WZ_{17}	—	November 26, 2020	Haleakala	Pan-STARRS 1	·	1.3 km	MPC · JPL
895547	2020 WL_{20}	—	January 20, 2009	Mount Lemmon	Mount Lemmon Survey	·	810 m	MPC · JPL
895548	2020 WN_{20}	—	November 16, 2020	Haleakala	Pan-STARRS 1	·	900 m	MPC · JPL
895549	2020 WF_{21}	—	April 16, 2017	Mount Lemmon	Mount Lemmon Survey	BRA	1.1 km	MPC · JPL
895550	2020 WO_{21}	—	November 23, 2020	Mount Lemmon	Mount Lemmon Survey	·	1.4 km	MPC · JPL
895551	2020 WC_{39}	—	October 2, 2006	Apache Point	SDSS Collaboration	·	1.2 km	MPC · JPL
895552	2020 XF_{11}	—	November 24, 2011	Mount Lemmon	Mount Lemmon Survey	·	1.2 km	MPC · JPL
895553	2020 XV_{12}	—	December 5, 2020	Mount Lemmon	Mount Lemmon Survey	·	1.4 km	MPC · JPL
895554	2020 XW_{16}	—	August 5, 2018	Haleakala	Pan-STARRS 1	·	1.4 km	MPC · JPL
895555	2020 XH_{17}	—	February 6, 2016	Haleakala	Pan-STARRS 1	·	1.8 km	MPC · JPL
895556	2020 XP_{17}	—	October 15, 2015	Haleakala	Pan-STARRS 1	AEO	680 m	MPC · JPL
895557	2020 XA_{21}	—	December 11, 2020	Haleakala	Pan-STARRS 1	HNS	650 m	MPC · JPL
895558	2020 XC_{22}	—	December 10, 2020	Haleakala	Pan-STARRS 1	·	1.3 km	MPC · JPL
895559	2020 XG_{22}	—	October 19, 2015	Haleakala	Pan-STARRS 1	·	1.2 km	MPC · JPL
895560	2020 XK_{27}	—	December 7, 2020	Kitt Peak-Bok	Bok NEO Survey	·	1.3 km	MPC · JPL
895561	2020 XS_{27}	—	September 28, 2019	Mount Lemmon	Mount Lemmon Survey	·	2.0 km	MPC · JPL
895562	2020 YQ_{4}	—	December 23, 2020	Mount Lemmon	Mount Lemmon Survey	AMO	260 m	MPC · JPL
895563	2020 YO_{8}	—	February 24, 2012	Mount Lemmon	Mount Lemmon Survey	·	1.3 km	MPC · JPL
895564	2020 YL_{10}	—	February 13, 2011	Mount Lemmon	Mount Lemmon Survey	·	1.1 km	MPC · JPL
895565	2020 YW_{11}	—	December 14, 2015	Mount Lemmon	Mount Lemmon Survey	GEF	870 m	MPC · JPL
895566	2020 YT_{14}	—	August 23, 2014	Haleakala	Pan-STARRS 1	·	1.3 km	MPC · JPL
895567	2020 YK_{16}	—	December 21, 2020	Mount Lemmon	Mount Lemmon Survey	H	440 m	MPC · JPL
895568	2020 YW_{22}	—	December 23, 2020	Haleakala	Pan-STARRS 1	·	2.3 km	MPC · JPL
895569	2020 YD_{26}	—	December 23, 2020	Haleakala	Pan-STARRS 1	·	1.5 km	MPC · JPL
895570	2020 YK_{28}	—	December 23, 2020	Haleakala	Pan-STARRS 1	·	1.5 km	MPC · JPL
895571	2021 AQ_{2}	—	August 24, 2017	Haleakala	Pan-STARRS 1	H	320 m	MPC · JPL
895572	2021 AH_{10}	—	January 9, 2021	Mount Lemmon	Mount Lemmon Survey	H	420 m	MPC · JPL
895573	2021 AZ_{10}	—	February 3, 2012	Mount Lemmon	Mount Lemmon Survey	DOR	1.3 km	MPC · JPL
895574	2021 AY_{11}	—	March 21, 2017	Haleakala	Pan-STARRS 1	(13314)	1.3 km	MPC · JPL
895575	2021 AC_{17}	—	April 19, 2006	Kitt Peak	Spacewatch	·	1.3 km	MPC · JPL
895576	2021 AT_{22}	—	January 5, 2021	Haleakala	Pan-STARRS 1	H	310 m	MPC · JPL
895577	2021 AY_{24}	—	September 27, 2009	Kitt Peak	Spacewatch	·	490 m	MPC · JPL
895578	2021 AK_{25}	—	November 27, 2014	Haleakala	Pan-STARRS 1	EOS	1.1 km	MPC · JPL
895579	2021 AO_{28}	—	January 12, 2021	Haleakala	Pan-STARRS 1	H	290 m	MPC · JPL
895580	2021 AP_{34}	—	November 26, 2014	Haleakala	Pan-STARRS 1	·	1.3 km	MPC · JPL
895581	2021 BN_{3}	—	January 19, 2012	Haleakala	Pan-STARRS 1	·	1.3 km	MPC · JPL
895582	2021 BU_{5}	—	September 24, 2019	Haleakala	Pan-STARRS 1	AGN	790 m	MPC · JPL
895583	2021 BO_{8}	—	February 16, 2012	Haleakala	Pan-STARRS 1	·	1.2 km	MPC · JPL
895584	2021 BC_{10}	—	February 5, 2016	Haleakala	Pan-STARRS 1	·	1.3 km	MPC · JPL
895585	2021 BA_{12}	—	February 26, 2014	Mount Lemmon	Mount Lemmon Survey	·	600 m	MPC · JPL
895586	2021 BH_{13}	—	October 24, 2019	Haleakala	Pan-STARRS 1	·	1.2 km	MPC · JPL
895587	2021 CF_{12}	—	January 27, 2007	Kitt Peak	Spacewatch	·	1.4 km	MPC · JPL
895588	2021 CU_{18}	—	February 7, 2021	Mount Lemmon	Mount Lemmon Survey	H	300 m	MPC · JPL
895589	2021 CS_{19}	—	January 17, 2015	Haleakala	Pan-STARRS 1	·	2.1 km	MPC · JPL
895590	2021 CU_{20}	—	February 7, 2021	Mount Lemmon	Mount Lemmon Survey	·	2.4 km	MPC · JPL
895591	2021 CJ_{21}	—	February 6, 2021	Mount Lemmon	Mount Lemmon Survey	·	2.0 km	MPC · JPL
895592	2021 CB_{23}	—	March 29, 2016	Cerro Tololo-DECam	DECam	EOS	1.2 km	MPC · JPL
895593	2021 CG_{23}	—	February 6, 2021	Mount Lemmon	Mount Lemmon Survey	TIR	2.4 km	MPC · JPL
895594	2021 CW_{23}	—	February 15, 2021	Kitt Peak-Bok	Bok NEO Survey	·	1.9 km	MPC · JPL
895595	2021 CD_{24}	—	December 26, 2014	Haleakala	Pan-STARRS 1	·	1.7 km	MPC · JPL
895596	2021 CM_{24}	—	January 18, 2015	Haleakala	Pan-STARRS 1	·	2.1 km	MPC · JPL
895597	2021 CU_{37}	—	March 9, 2011	Mount Lemmon	Mount Lemmon Survey	·	1.4 km	MPC · JPL
895598	2021 CV_{37}	—	October 6, 2008	Mount Lemmon	Mount Lemmon Survey	·	1.3 km	MPC · JPL
895599	2021 CH_{38}	—	February 15, 2021	Mount Lemmon	Mount Lemmon Survey	H	380 m	MPC · JPL
895600	2021 CP_{44}	—	February 15, 2021	Mount Lemmon	Mount Lemmon Survey	H	360 m	MPC · JPL

== 895601–895700 ==
back to top

Designation			Discovery			Properties		Ref
Permanent	Provisional	Named after	Date	Site	Discoverer(s)	Category	Diam.	Ref
895601	2021 CC_{52}	—	February 7, 2021	Haleakala	Pan-STARRS 1	·	2.0 km	MPC · JPL
895602	2021 CJ_{62}	—	February 7, 2021	Haleakala	Pan-STARRS 1	·	1.5 km	MPC · JPL
895603	2021 DA	—	February 15, 2021	Mount Lemmon	Mount Lemmon Survey	H	440 m	MPC · JPL
895604	2021 DK_{3}	—	December 21, 2014	Haleakala	Pan-STARRS 1	·	1.7 km	MPC · JPL
895605	2021 DR_{7}	—	March 4, 2016	Haleakala	Pan-STARRS 1	EOS	1.4 km	MPC · JPL
895606	2021 DS_{7}	—	October 26, 2019	Mount Lemmon	Mount Lemmon Survey	·	460 m	MPC · JPL
895607	2021 DV_{8}	—	February 16, 2021	Haleakala	Pan-STARRS 1	·	1.3 km	MPC · JPL
895608	2021 DS_{9}	—	February 22, 2014	Kitt Peak	Spacewatch	·	500 m	MPC · JPL
895609	2021 DX_{9}	—	February 16, 2021	Haleakala	Pan-STARRS 1	·	1.7 km	MPC · JPL
895610	2021 DP_{14}	—	April 4, 2014	Haleakala	Pan-STARRS 1	·	670 m	MPC · JPL
895611	2021 DW_{14}	—	March 3, 2016	Haleakala	Pan-STARRS 1	EOS	1.4 km	MPC · JPL
895612	2021 DQ_{16}	—	October 9, 2013	Mount Lemmon	Mount Lemmon Survey	EOS	1.3 km	MPC · JPL
895613	2021 DR_{16}	—	February 17, 2021	Haleakala	Pan-STARRS 1	·	2.0 km	MPC · JPL
895614	2021 DR_{18}	—	February 16, 2021	Haleakala	Pan-STARRS 1	H	350 m	MPC · JPL
895615	2021 DG_{20}	—	February 22, 2021	Haleakala	Pan-STARRS 2	·	2.5 km	MPC · JPL
895616	2021 DJ_{20}	—	February 18, 2021	Mount Lemmon	Mount Lemmon Survey	·	2.0 km	MPC · JPL
895617	2021 ER_{5}	—	February 3, 2013	Haleakala	Pan-STARRS 1	H	450 m	MPC · JPL
895618	2021 EB_{10}	—	September 25, 2012	Mount Lemmon	Mount Lemmon Survey	·	2.1 km	MPC · JPL
895619	2021 EP_{10}	—	January 25, 2015	Haleakala	Pan-STARRS 1	·	2.3 km	MPC · JPL
895620	2021 EY_{11}	—	August 31, 2019	Haleakala	Pan-STARRS 1	·	410 m	MPC · JPL
895621	2021 ED_{12}	—	November 3, 2007	Mount Lemmon	Mount Lemmon Survey	VER	1.8 km	MPC · JPL
895622	2021 EC_{13}	—	October 5, 2013	Haleakala	Pan-STARRS 1	·	1.4 km	MPC · JPL
895623	2021 EA_{14}	—	January 1, 2009	Kitt Peak	Spacewatch	·	1.9 km	MPC · JPL
895624	2021 EC_{16}	—	October 24, 2019	Haleakala	Pan-STARRS 1	BAP	640 m	MPC · JPL
895625	2021 EL_{18}	—	April 30, 2016	Haleakala	Pan-STARRS 1	·	1.8 km	MPC · JPL
895626	2021 EK_{19}	—	June 27, 2014	Haleakala	Pan-STARRS 1	·	840 m	MPC · JPL
895627	2021 EB_{20}	—	May 1, 2016	Cerro Tololo-DECam	DECam	·	1.7 km	MPC · JPL
895628	2021 EM_{27}	—	March 12, 2016	Haleakala	Pan-STARRS 1	·	1.3 km	MPC · JPL
895629	2021 EJ_{28}	—	October 3, 2018	Haleakala	Pan-STARRS 2	·	1.7 km	MPC · JPL
895630	2021 EN_{29}	—	November 9, 2013	Haleakala	Pan-STARRS 1	·	1.9 km	MPC · JPL
895631	2021 EC_{32}	—	January 29, 2015	Haleakala	Pan-STARRS 1	·	2.1 km	MPC · JPL
895632	2021 EE_{32}	—	March 4, 2016	Haleakala	Pan-STARRS 1	·	1.3 km	MPC · JPL
895633	2021 ES_{32}	—	January 20, 2015	Haleakala	Pan-STARRS 1	·	1.7 km	MPC · JPL
895634	2021 EQ_{35}	—	February 14, 2010	Mount Lemmon	Mount Lemmon Survey	·	1.3 km	MPC · JPL
895635	2021 EY_{35}	—	October 5, 2013	Haleakala	Pan-STARRS 1	·	1.9 km	MPC · JPL
895636	2021 EJ_{36}	—	February 16, 2015	Haleakala	Pan-STARRS 1	·	2.0 km	MPC · JPL
895637	2021 ER_{39}	—	July 10, 2018	Haleakala	Pan-STARRS 1	·	810 m	MPC · JPL
895638	2021 EY_{39}	—	February 24, 2015	Haleakala	Pan-STARRS 1	·	2.3 km	MPC · JPL
895639	2021 EA_{49}	—	January 17, 2015	Mount Lemmon	Mount Lemmon Survey	·	2.1 km	MPC · JPL
895640	2021 EC_{55}	—	January 26, 2015	Haleakala	Pan-STARRS 1	·	2.1 km	MPC · JPL
895641	2021 EH_{55}	—	March 7, 2021	Mount Lemmon	Mount Lemmon Survey	KOR	970 m	MPC · JPL
895642	2021 EN_{55}	—	March 7, 2021	Mount Lemmon	Mount Lemmon Survey	·	2.3 km	MPC · JPL
895643	2021 EQ_{55}	—	March 15, 2021	Haleakala	Pan-STARRS 1	·	1.3 km	MPC · JPL
895644	2021 EZ_{56}	—	January 25, 2020	Haleakala	Pan-STARRS 1	·	1.9 km	MPC · JPL
895645	2021 FW_{3}	—	March 18, 2021	Mount Lemmon	Mount Lemmon Survey	H	350 m	MPC · JPL
895646	2021 FT_{4}	—	October 24, 2019	Haleakala	Pan-STARRS 1	·	490 m	MPC · JPL
895647	2021 FV_{5}	—	January 18, 2015	Kitt Peak	Spacewatch	·	1.8 km	MPC · JPL
895648	2021 FL_{8}	—	October 30, 2013	Haleakala	Pan-STARRS 1	EOS	1.3 km	MPC · JPL
895649	2021 FY_{8}	—	April 15, 2010	Mount Lemmon	Mount Lemmon Survey	·	2.0 km	MPC · JPL
895650	2021 FV_{21}	—	June 21, 2018	Haleakala	Pan-STARRS 1	·	600 m	MPC · JPL
895651	2021 FS_{22}	—	January 24, 2015	Haleakala	Pan-STARRS 1	·	1.8 km	MPC · JPL
895652	2021 FT_{24}	—	January 14, 2015	Haleakala	Pan-STARRS 1	·	1.9 km	MPC · JPL
895653	2021 FY_{27}	—	March 19, 2010	Mount Lemmon	Mount Lemmon Survey	·	1.6 km	MPC · JPL
895654	2021 FS_{28}	—	March 20, 2021	Haleakala	Pan-STARRS 1	·	1.9 km	MPC · JPL
895655	2021 FY_{28}	—	February 17, 2015	Haleakala	Pan-STARRS 1	·	2.2 km	MPC · JPL
895656	2021 FR_{30}	—	December 21, 2014	Haleakala	Pan-STARRS 1	·	1.3 km	MPC · JPL
895657	2021 FO_{31}	—	March 15, 2016	Haleakala	Pan-STARRS 1	·	1.7 km	MPC · JPL
895658	2021 FF_{32}	—	June 4, 2016	Mount Lemmon	Mount Lemmon Survey	·	1.2 km	MPC · JPL
895659	2021 FS_{34}	—	January 17, 2015	Haleakala	Pan-STARRS 1	·	1.7 km	MPC · JPL
895660	2021 FY_{39}	—	January 15, 2015	Haleakala	Pan-STARRS 1	·	1.8 km	MPC · JPL
895661	2021 FN_{41}	—	April 1, 2012	Mount Lemmon	Mount Lemmon Survey	·	1.6 km	MPC · JPL
895662	2021 FA_{42}	—	January 19, 2015	Haleakala	Pan-STARRS 1	·	2.1 km	MPC · JPL
895663	2021 FF_{42}	—	March 20, 2021	Haleakala	Pan-STARRS 1	·	2.4 km	MPC · JPL
895664	2021 FK_{43}	—	January 3, 2009	Kitt Peak	Spacewatch	·	1.7 km	MPC · JPL
895665	2021 FN_{43}	—	March 20, 2021	Mount Lemmon	Mount Lemmon Survey	·	2.2 km	MPC · JPL
895666	2021 FX_{50}	—	January 18, 2015	Haleakala	Pan-STARRS 1	·	2.1 km	MPC · JPL
895667	2021 GO_{6}	—	March 28, 2016	Cerro Tololo-DECam	DECam	H	390 m	MPC · JPL
895668	2021 GL_{8}	—	April 3, 2021	Haleakala	Pan-STARRS 1	·	880 m	MPC · JPL
895669	2021 GN_{13}	—	March 17, 2015	Mount Lemmon	Mount Lemmon Survey	·	1.9 km	MPC · JPL
895670	2021 GL_{14}	—	September 4, 2007	Mount Lemmon	Mount Lemmon Survey	·	770 m	MPC · JPL
895671	2021 GO_{14}	—	September 18, 2017	Haleakala	Pan-STARRS 1	·	2.1 km	MPC · JPL
895672	2021 GX_{18}	—	February 26, 2011	Mount Lemmon	Mount Lemmon Survey	·	380 m	MPC · JPL
895673	2021 GU_{19}	—	February 20, 2015	Haleakala	Pan-STARRS 1	·	2.0 km	MPC · JPL
895674	2021 GS_{20}	—	March 17, 2016	Haleakala	Pan-STARRS 1	·	1.5 km	MPC · JPL
895675	2021 GG_{21}	—	May 7, 2016	Haleakala	Pan-STARRS 1	·	1.5 km	MPC · JPL
895676	2021 GA_{26}	—	November 26, 2013	Mount Lemmon	Mount Lemmon Survey	·	2.0 km	MPC · JPL
895677	2021 GA_{29}	—	November 24, 2019	Mount Lemmon	Mount Lemmon Survey	·	1.4 km	MPC · JPL
895678	2021 GV_{40}	—	December 29, 2014	Haleakala	Pan-STARRS 1	·	1.6 km	MPC · JPL
895679	2021 GQ_{42}	—	April 3, 2016	Haleakala	Pan-STARRS 1	·	1.9 km	MPC · JPL
895680	2021 GF_{43}	—	January 15, 2010	Mount Lemmon	Mount Lemmon Survey	·	1.5 km	MPC · JPL
895681	2021 GS_{46}	—	March 20, 2015	Haleakala	Pan-STARRS 1	·	2.1 km	MPC · JPL
895682	2021 GE_{48}	—	April 4, 2021	Mount Lemmon	Mount Lemmon Survey	EOS	1.3 km	MPC · JPL
895683	2021 GD_{49}	—	July 28, 2014	Haleakala	Pan-STARRS 1	·	730 m	MPC · JPL
895684	2021 GV_{52}	—	February 16, 2015	Haleakala	Pan-STARRS 1	·	1.7 km	MPC · JPL
895685	2021 GM_{55}	—	January 20, 2015	Haleakala	Pan-STARRS 1	·	1.4 km	MPC · JPL
895686	2021 GG_{60}	—	April 1, 2005	Kitt Peak	Spacewatch	·	1.7 km	MPC · JPL
895687	2021 GK_{60}	—	January 16, 2009	Mount Lemmon	Mount Lemmon Survey	THM	1.5 km	MPC · JPL
895688	2021 GY_{60}	—	February 17, 2015	Haleakala	Pan-STARRS 1	·	2.3 km	MPC · JPL
895689	2021 GQ_{63}	—	April 15, 2021	Haleakala	Pan-STARRS 1	·	2.3 km	MPC · JPL
895690	2021 GG_{70}	—	April 9, 2021	Haleakala	Pan-STARRS 1	EOS	1.2 km	MPC · JPL
895691	2021 GR_{72}	—	October 11, 2012	Mount Lemmon	Mount Lemmon Survey	·	1.7 km	MPC · JPL
895692	2021 GK_{76}	—	April 10, 2021	Mount Lemmon	Mount Lemmon Survey	·	2.8 km	MPC · JPL
895693	2021 GW_{79}	—	January 24, 2015	Haleakala	Pan-STARRS 1	·	1.8 km	MPC · JPL
895694	2021 GF_{88}	—	April 5, 2014	Haleakala	Pan-STARRS 1	·	400 m	MPC · JPL
895695	2021 GY_{99}	—	February 24, 2015	Haleakala	Pan-STARRS 1	·	1.6 km	MPC · JPL
895696	2021 GO_{103}	—	April 7, 2021	Haleakala	Pan-STARRS 1	·	2.2 km	MPC · JPL
895697	2021 GV_{104}	—	January 16, 2015	Haleakala	Pan-STARRS 1	·	1.6 km	MPC · JPL
895698	2021 GM_{108}	—	April 22, 2011	Kitt Peak	Spacewatch	·	450 m	MPC · JPL
895699	2021 GK_{114}	—	April 8, 2021	Haleakala	Pan-STARRS 1	·	2.4 km	MPC · JPL
895700	2021 GR_{125}	—	April 5, 2021	Mount Lemmon	Mount Lemmon Survey	H	390 m	MPC · JPL

== 895701–895800 ==
back to top

Designation			Discovery			Properties		Ref
Permanent	Provisional	Named after	Date	Site	Discoverer(s)	Category	Diam.	Ref
895701	2021 GA_{142}	—	January 7, 2015	Cerro Tololo-DECam	DECam	·	1.9 km	MPC · JPL
895702	2021 GA_{145}	—	October 10, 2018	Haleakala	Pan-STARRS 2	·	2.0 km	MPC · JPL
895703	2021 GR_{175}	—	November 8, 2018	Haleakala	Pan-STARRS 2	·	2.1 km	MPC · JPL
895704	2021 GD_{180}	—	April 8, 2021	Haleakala	Pan-STARRS 1	·	2.1 km	MPC · JPL
895705	2021 GH_{183}	—	April 11, 2021	Haleakala	Pan-STARRS 1	·	500 m	MPC · JPL
895706	2021 GF_{193}	—	April 9, 2021	CHILESCOPE	Kessler, T.	·	500 m	MPC · JPL
895707	2021 GC_{224}	—	December 15, 2006	Mount Lemmon	Mount Lemmon Survey	·	420 m	MPC · JPL
895708	2021 GB_{236}	—	August 22, 2014	Haleakala	Pan-STARRS 1	·	690 m	MPC · JPL
895709	2021 HH_{7}	—	November 16, 2017	Mount Lemmon	Mount Lemmon Survey	·	2.1 km	MPC · JPL
895710	2021 HS_{13}	—	January 21, 2015	Haleakala	Pan-STARRS 1	·	2.2 km	MPC · JPL
895711	2021 HU_{15}	—	February 17, 2015	Haleakala	Pan-STARRS 1	·	1.4 km	MPC · JPL
895712	2021 HB_{23}	—	January 23, 2015	Kitt Peak	Spacewatch	·	1.6 km	MPC · JPL
895713	2021 HH_{25}	—	November 10, 2018	Haleakala	Pan-STARRS 2	VER	1.8 km	MPC · JPL
895714	2021 HR_{25}	—	January 22, 2015	Haleakala	Pan-STARRS 1	·	1.7 km	MPC · JPL
895715	2021 HF_{27}	—	April 18, 2015	Cerro Tololo-DECam	DECam	·	2.3 km	MPC · JPL
895716	2021 JT_{2}	—	September 5, 2019	Mount Lemmon	Mount Lemmon Survey	H	310 m	MPC · JPL
895717	2021 JT_{7}	—	August 1, 2017	Haleakala	Pan-STARRS 1	EOS	1.3 km	MPC · JPL
895718	2021 JO_{24}	—	May 9, 2021	Mount Lemmon	Mount Lemmon Survey	·	1.4 km	MPC · JPL
895719	2021 JL_{25}	—	February 18, 2015	Haleakala	Pan-STARRS 1	·	2.2 km	MPC · JPL
895720	2021 JB_{50}	—	April 15, 2010	Mount Lemmon	Mount Lemmon Survey	·	1.9 km	MPC · JPL
895721	2021 JD_{57}	—	September 7, 2018	Mount Lemmon	Mount Lemmon Survey	·	740 m	MPC · JPL
895722	2021 JX_{58}	—	January 30, 2015	Haleakala	Pan-STARRS 1	H	410 m	MPC · JPL
895723	2021 KB_{2}	—	December 11, 2012	Catalina	CSS	·	680 m	MPC · JPL
895724	2021 LB_{12}	—	September 23, 2015	Haleakala	Pan-STARRS 1	·	490 m	MPC · JPL
895725	2021 LX_{30}	—	January 31, 2009	Mount Lemmon	Mount Lemmon Survey	H	380 m	MPC · JPL
895726	2021 LQ_{49}	—	April 20, 2015	Haleakala	Pan-STARRS 1	·	2.3 km	MPC · JPL
895727	2021 NF_{9}	—	August 28, 2014	Haleakala	Pan-STARRS 1	·	640 m	MPC · JPL
895728	2021 NT_{14}	—	July 6, 2021	Haleakala	Pan-STARRS 1	APO · PHA	260 m	MPC · JPL
895729	2021 OA_{10}	—	October 2, 2013	Kitt Peak	Spacewatch	·	790 m	MPC · JPL
895730	2021 PK_{11}	—	December 21, 2008	Mount Lemmon	Mount Lemmon Survey	·	500 m	MPC · JPL
895731	2021 PP_{17}	—	September 21, 2017	Haleakala	Pan-STARRS 1	·	940 m	MPC · JPL
895732	2021 PQ_{30}	—	April 29, 2014	Cerro Tololo-DECam	DECam	·	720 m	MPC · JPL
895733	2021 PY_{39}	—	September 4, 2008	Kitt Peak	Spacewatch	·	1.2 km	MPC · JPL
895734	2021 PN_{72}	—	August 13, 2021	Haleakala	Pan-STARRS 1	T_{j} (0.26) · unusual	20 km	MPC · JPL
895735	2021 PN_{80}	—	September 14, 2007	Kitt Peak	Spacewatch	·	1.0 km	MPC · JPL
895736	2021 PV_{110}	—	August 28, 2014	Haleakala	Pan-STARRS 1	·	520 m	MPC · JPL
895737	2021 PT_{126}	—	January 19, 2012	Haleakala	Pan-STARRS 1	·	1.8 km	MPC · JPL
895738	2021 PN_{129}	—	November 16, 2003	Kitt Peak	Spacewatch	·	610 m	MPC · JPL
895739	2021 PB_{177}	—	August 5, 2021	Haleakala	Pan-STARRS 1	TEL	900 m	MPC · JPL
895740	2021 QM_{47}	—	October 14, 2007	Kitt Peak	Spacewatch	·	520 m	MPC · JPL
895741	2021 QV_{64}	—	December 20, 2014	Haleakala	Pan-STARRS 1	PHO	660 m	MPC · JPL
895742	2021 QB_{119}	—	October 24, 2014	Kitt Peak	Spacewatch	·	750 m	MPC · JPL
895743	2021 QX_{123}	—	January 20, 2015	Haleakala	Pan-STARRS 1	·	1.0 km	MPC · JPL
895744	2021 RC_{5}	—	September 4, 2021	Haleakala	Pan-STARRS 1	L4	7.2 km	MPC · JPL
895745	2021 RH_{9}	—	September 19, 2006	Catalina	CSS	·	690 m	MPC · JPL
895746	2021 RH_{31}	—	November 18, 2011	Mount Lemmon	Mount Lemmon Survey	·	440 m	MPC · JPL
895747	2021 RE_{36}	—	October 29, 2017	Mount Lemmon	Mount Lemmon Survey	EUN	620 m	MPC · JPL
895748	2021 RY_{44}	—	December 3, 2010	Mount Lemmon	Mount Lemmon Survey	·	2.1 km	MPC · JPL
895749	2021 RL_{61}	—	January 30, 2006	Kitt Peak	Spacewatch	·	990 m	MPC · JPL
895750	2021 RM_{72}	—	July 6, 2019	Haleakala	Pan-STARRS 1	L4	6.2 km	MPC · JPL
895751	2021 RA_{100}	—	September 21, 2003	Kitt Peak	Spacewatch	·	590 m	MPC · JPL
895752	2021 RA_{104}	—	September 5, 2000	Kitt Peak	Spacewatch	·	640 m	MPC · JPL
895753	2021 RQ_{104}	—	January 1, 2009	Kitt Peak	Spacewatch	·	1.4 km	MPC · JPL
895754	2021 RS_{121}	—	September 27, 2014	Mount Lemmon	Mount Lemmon Survey	BAP	600 m	MPC · JPL
895755	2021 RF_{136}	—	December 14, 2018	Haleakala	Pan-STARRS 1	·	450 m	MPC · JPL
895756	2021 RJ_{138}	—	November 30, 2003	Kitt Peak	Spacewatch	·	660 m	MPC · JPL
895757	2021 RC_{148}	—	April 18, 2015	Cerro Tololo-DECam	DECam	L4	6.0 km	MPC · JPL
895758	2021 RE_{253}	—	September 8, 2021	Haleakala	Pan-STARRS 1	L4	6.7 km	MPC · JPL
895759	2021 SY_{31}	—	October 17, 2010	Mount Lemmon	Mount Lemmon Survey	NYS	760 m	MPC · JPL
895760	2021 SV_{57}	—	August 21, 2015	Haleakala	Pan-STARRS 1	·	1.4 km	MPC · JPL
895761	2021 SC_{75}	—	September 29, 2021	Haleakala	Pan-STARRS 2	L4	6.8 km	MPC · JPL
895762	2021 SO_{75}	—	February 25, 2018	Mount Lemmon	Mount Lemmon Survey	·	1.8 km	MPC · JPL
895763	2021 TS_{17}	—	April 18, 2015	Cerro Tololo-DECam	DECam	L4	5.3 km	MPC · JPL
895764	2021 TM_{37}	—	July 1, 2019	Haleakala	Pan-STARRS 1	L4	5.0 km	MPC · JPL
895765	2021 TW_{46}	—	May 20, 2015	Cerro Tololo-DECam	DECam	·	1.1 km	MPC · JPL
895766	2021 TL_{96}	—	October 14, 2021	Haleakala	Pan-STARRS 1	·	1.1 km	MPC · JPL
895767	2021 TN_{191}	—	May 11, 2015	Mount Lemmon	Mount Lemmon Survey	·	1.3 km	MPC · JPL
895768	2021 TF_{193}	—	October 2, 2021	Haleakala	Pan-STARRS 1	L4	6.8 km	MPC · JPL
895769	2021 UP_{17}	—	December 4, 2007	Mount Lemmon	Mount Lemmon Survey	·	580 m	MPC · JPL
895770	2021 UT_{23}	—	October 14, 2010	Mount Lemmon	Mount Lemmon Survey	·	620 m	MPC · JPL
895771	2021 UZ_{25}	—	January 14, 2018	Mount Lemmon	Mount Lemmon Survey	·	1.9 km	MPC · JPL
895772	2021 UV_{26}	—	August 8, 2016	Haleakala	Pan-STARRS 1	AGN	780 m	MPC · JPL
895773	2021 UB_{46}	—	January 22, 2015	Haleakala	Pan-STARRS 1	·	650 m	MPC · JPL
895774	2021 UA_{60}	—	July 25, 2015	Haleakala	Pan-STARRS 1	·	1.5 km	MPC · JPL
895775	2021 UM_{88}	—	October 17, 2021	Mount Lemmon	Mount Lemmon Survey	·	1.9 km	MPC · JPL
895776	2021 UK_{110}	—	May 21, 2015	Haleakala	Pan-STARRS 1	·	730 m	MPC · JPL
895777	2021 VY_{20}	—	September 27, 2016	Haleakala	Pan-STARRS 1	·	1.5 km	MPC · JPL
895778	2021 VU_{25}	—	October 30, 2017	Haleakala	Pan-STARRS 1	·	780 m	MPC · JPL
895779	2021 VY_{33}	—	October 1, 2003	Kitt Peak	Spacewatch	·	600 m	MPC · JPL
895780	2021 VX_{46}	—	July 18, 2020	Haleakala	Pan-STARRS 1	·	800 m	MPC · JPL
895781	2021 VC_{47}	—	December 26, 2017	Mount Lemmon	Mount Lemmon Survey	·	700 m	MPC · JPL
895782	2021 VU_{47}	—	January 2, 2017	Haleakala	Pan-STARRS 1	·	2.4 km	MPC · JPL
895783	2021 VP_{65}	—	March 17, 2018	Mount Lemmon	Mount Lemmon Survey	·	1.5 km	MPC · JPL
895784	2021 VT_{70}	—	December 29, 2008	Kitt Peak	Spacewatch	·	450 m	MPC · JPL
895785	2021 WK_{15}	—	August 21, 2014	Haleakala	Pan-STARRS 1	·	2.3 km	MPC · JPL
895786	2021 YM	—	December 26, 2021	ATLAS-MLO, Mauna L	ATLAS	T_{j} (2.98) · APO	660 m	MPC · JPL
895787	2022 AZ_{7}	—	January 14, 2022	Mount Lemmon	Mount Lemmon Survey	APO +1km	1 km	MPC · JPL
895788	2022 AA_{12}	—	February 17, 2018	Mount Lemmon	Mount Lemmon Survey	·	870 m	MPC · JPL
895789	2022 AF_{16}	—	March 17, 2015	Catalina	CSS	PHO	710 m	MPC · JPL
895790	2022 AV_{32}	—	June 11, 2015	Haleakala	Pan-STARRS 1	·	930 m	MPC · JPL
895791	2022 AU_{48}	—	January 6, 2022	Haleakala	Pan-STARRS 2	·	1.2 km	MPC · JPL
895792	2022 BS_{11}	—	May 20, 2015	Cerro Tololo-DECam	DECam	·	790 m	MPC · JPL
895793	2022 BL_{16}	—	December 25, 2017	Haleakala	Pan-STARRS 1	·	820 m	MPC · JPL
895794	2022 BL_{19}	—	January 13, 2008	Kitt Peak	Spacewatch	·	1.6 km	MPC · JPL
895795	2022 BN_{19}	—	January 14, 2018	Haleakala	Pan-STARRS 1	·	1.0 km	MPC · JPL
895796	2022 BM_{21}	—	May 11, 2015	Mount Lemmon	Mount Lemmon Survey	·	900 m	MPC · JPL
895797	2022 BN_{22}	—	February 22, 2014	Mount Lemmon	Mount Lemmon Survey	·	620 m	MPC · JPL
895798	2022 BC_{31}	—	August 28, 2012	Mount Lemmon	Mount Lemmon Survey	·	1.1 km	MPC · JPL
895799	2022 BC_{35}	—	October 29, 2016	Mount Lemmon	Mount Lemmon Survey	EUN	730 m	MPC · JPL
895800	2022 BQ_{35}	—	January 2, 2017	Haleakala	Pan-STARRS 1	·	1.4 km	MPC · JPL

== 895801–895900 ==
back to top

Designation			Discovery			Properties		Ref
Permanent	Provisional	Named after	Date	Site	Discoverer(s)	Category	Diam.	Ref
895801	2022 BH_{39}	—	July 25, 2015	Haleakala	Pan-STARRS 1	·	760 m	MPC · JPL
895802	2022 CL_{4}	—	February 4, 2022	Haleakala	Pan-STARRS 2	AMO	470 m	MPC · JPL
895803	2022 CU_{5}	—	November 1, 2008	Mount Lemmon	Mount Lemmon Survey	·	650 m	MPC · JPL
895804	2022 CW_{8}	—	April 10, 2010	Mount Lemmon	Mount Lemmon Survey	·	730 m	MPC · JPL
895805	2022 CS_{15}	—	April 15, 2018	Mount Lemmon	Mount Lemmon Survey	EUN	890 m	MPC · JPL
895806	2022 CA_{17}	—	August 14, 2016	Haleakala	Pan-STARRS 1	·	750 m	MPC · JPL
895807	2022 CG_{18}	—	February 9, 2022	Mount Lemmon	Mount Lemmon Survey	·	1.3 km	MPC · JPL
895808	2022 CH_{19}	—	May 2, 2009	Mount Lemmon	Mount Lemmon Survey	·	1.4 km	MPC · JPL
895809	2022 CH_{20}	—	August 23, 2020	Haleakala	Pan-STARRS 1	HNS	770 m	MPC · JPL
895810	2022 CK_{20}	—	January 12, 2018	Haleakala	Pan-STARRS 1	·	950 m	MPC · JPL
895811	2022 CF_{21}	—	May 18, 2018	Mount Lemmon	Mount Lemmon Survey	·	890 m	MPC · JPL
895812	2022 CF_{29}	—	February 4, 2022	Haleakala	Pan-STARRS 2	·	1.6 km	MPC · JPL
895813	2022 DC_{5}	—	February 25, 2022	Haleakala	Pan-STARRS 2	APO	90 m	MPC · JPL
895814	2022 DU_{8}	—	July 6, 2019	Haleakala	Pan-STARRS 1	·	1.2 km	MPC · JPL
895815	2022 DO_{15}	—	November 16, 2020	Haleakala	Pan-STARRS 1	·	1.1 km	MPC · JPL
895816	2022 EQ_{5}	—	March 18, 2018	Haleakala	Pan-STARRS 1	·	630 m	MPC · JPL
895817	2022 EL_{8}	—	October 26, 2011	Haleakala	Pan-STARRS 1	·	1.2 km	MPC · JPL
895818	2022 EV_{8}	—	May 21, 2014	Haleakala	Pan-STARRS 1	·	730 m	MPC · JPL
895819	2022 EQ_{16}	—	May 7, 2014	Haleakala	Pan-STARRS 1	·	860 m	MPC · JPL
895820	2022 EZ_{16}	—	February 3, 2009	Kitt Peak	Spacewatch	·	970 m	MPC · JPL
895821	2022 EO_{17}	—	March 2, 2022	MAPS, San Pedro de	A. Maury, Attard, G.	(1547)	1.2 km	MPC · JPL
895822	2022 EW_{17}	—	May 6, 2014	Haleakala	Pan-STARRS 1	·	900 m	MPC · JPL
895823	2022 FF_{5}	—	January 3, 2009	Mount Lemmon	Mount Lemmon Survey	·	930 m	MPC · JPL
895824	2022 FS_{7}	—	June 24, 2014	Haleakala	Pan-STARRS 1	·	1.0 km	MPC · JPL
895825	2022 FB_{10}	—	May 30, 2014	Haleakala	Pan-STARRS 1	·	830 m	MPC · JPL
895826	2022 FW_{16}	—	March 25, 2022	Haleakala	Pan-STARRS 2	·	1.6 km	MPC · JPL
895827	2022 GG_{8}	—	March 8, 2013	Haleakala	Pan-STARRS 1	·	1.2 km	MPC · JPL
895828	2022 GB_{12}	—	March 11, 2008	Kitt Peak	Spacewatch	·	1.3 km	MPC · JPL
895829	2022 HO_{11}	—	March 16, 2013	Kitt Peak	Spacewatch	·	1.1 km	MPC · JPL
895830	2022 HL_{14}	—	April 26, 2022	Haleakala	Pan-STARRS 2	·	2.1 km	MPC · JPL
895831	2022 HO_{18}	—	April 25, 2022	Haleakala	Pan-STARRS 2	·	1.6 km	MPC · JPL
895832	2022 HQ_{21}	—	September 26, 2019	Haleakala	Pan-STARRS 1	PAD	1.0 km	MPC · JPL
895833	2022 KO_{13}	—	November 26, 2019	Haleakala	Pan-STARRS 1	EOS	1.2 km	MPC · JPL
895834	2022 KB_{29}	—	May 28, 2022	Haleakala	Pan-STARRS 2	·	1.8 km	MPC · JPL
895835	2022 NN_{1}	—	July 9, 2022	Haleakala	Pan-STARRS 2	APO	340 m	MPC · JPL
895836	2022 RN_{14}	—	July 23, 2015	Haleakala	Pan-STARRS 1	(2076)	500 m	MPC · JPL
895837	2022 TN_{4}	—	September 13, 2005	Kitt Peak	Spacewatch	·	430 m	MPC · JPL
895838	2022 UW_{31}	—	November 6, 2012	Kitt Peak	Spacewatch	·	430 m	MPC · JPL
895839	2022 WW_{12}	—	November 30, 2022	Mount Lemmon	Mount Lemmon Survey	AMO	490 m	MPC · JPL
895840	2023 FM_{43}	—	June 30, 2019	Haleakala	Pan-STARRS 1	·	1.0 km	MPC · JPL
895841	2023 HO_{4}	—	April 23, 2023	Mount Lemmon	Mount Lemmon Survey	APO	80 m	MPC · JPL
895842	2023 HU_{18}	—	April 23, 2023	Haleakala	Pan-STARRS 2	·	380 m	MPC · JPL
895843	2023 HH_{40}	—	October 29, 2008	Mount Lemmon	Mount Lemmon Survey	·	1.1 km	MPC · JPL
895844	2023 RO_{44}	—	October 19, 2006	Mount Lemmon	Mount Lemmon Survey	T_{j} (2.91)	2.7 km	MPC · JPL
895845	2023 RK_{49}	—	October 8, 2007	Mount Lemmon	Mount Lemmon Survey	·	2.0 km	MPC · JPL
895846	2023 RD_{57}	—	January 19, 2015	Haleakala	Pan-STARRS 1	·	2.0 km	MPC · JPL
895847	2023 SW_{65}	—	September 18, 2023	Haleakala	Pan-STARRS 2	T_{j} (2.7) · unusual	4.1 km	MPC · JPL
895848	2023 TF_{185}	—	November 8, 2013	Kitt Peak	Spacewatch	EOS	1.4 km	MPC · JPL
895849	2024 AV_{1}	—	January 7, 2024	ATLAS Chile, Rio H	ATLAS Chile, Rio H	APO	260 m	MPC · JPL
895850	2024 AN_{2}	—	January 4, 2024	Haleakala	Pan-STARRS 1	APO · PHA	170 m	MPC · JPL
895851	2024 JF_{9}	—	November 26, 2014	Haleakala	Pan-STARRS 1	H	310 m	MPC · JPL
895852	2024 JL_{23}	—	May 7, 2024	Haleakala	Pan-STARRS 2	·	20 km	MPC · JPL
895853	2024 RA_{169}	—	February 1, 2017	Subaru Telescope,	Subaru Telescope	L5	4.6 km	MPC · JPL
895854	2024 RX_{196}	—	September 6, 2015	Kitt Peak	Spacewatch	·	1.2 km	MPC · JPL
895855	2024 SB_{10}	—	October 13, 2016	Haleakala	Pan-STARRS 1	·	820 m	MPC · JPL
895856	2024 SQ_{20}	—	February 9, 2013	Haleakala	Pan-STARRS 1	·	1.0 km	MPC · JPL
895857	2024 TL_{87}	—	April 19, 2012	Mount Lemmon	Mount Lemmon Survey	·	1.2 km	MPC · JPL
895858	2024 UC_{15}	—	January 26, 2015	Haleakala	Pan-STARRS 1	·	2.4 km	MPC · JPL
895859	2024 VH_{13}	—	November 2, 2019	Subaru Telescope,	Subaru Telescope	·	1.0 km	MPC · JPL
895860	2024 XV_{31}	—	March 15, 2021	Haleakala	Pan-STARRS 1	·	1.6 km	MPC · JPL
895861	2024 YK_{47}	—	January 17, 2013	Haleakala	Pan-STARRS 1	L4	5.7 km	MPC · JPL
895862	2025 BG_{8}	—	October 14, 2015	Subaru Telescope,	Subaru Telescope	·	640 m	MPC · JPL
895863	2025 DF_{31}	—	February 3, 2013	Haleakala	Pan-STARRS 1	L4	5.2 km	MPC · JPL
895864	2025 EA_{6}	—	March 1, 2025	Haleakala	Pan-STARRS 1	T_{j} (2.69)	10 km	MPC · JPL
895865	2025 KM_{10}	—	November 28, 2014	Subaru Telescope,	Subaru Telescope	·	1.1 km	MPC · JPL
895866	2025 MD_{108}	—	August 28, 2006	Apache Point	SDSS Collaboration	·	1.3 km	MPC · JPL
895867	2025 MB_{119}	—	February 7, 2011	Mount Lemmon	Mount Lemmon Survey	·	910 m	MPC · JPL
895868	2025 ME_{123}	—	January 10, 2014	Mount Lemmon	Mount Lemmon Survey	·	1.2 km	MPC · JPL
895869	2025 MV_{124}	—	March 27, 2008	Mount Lemmon	Mount Lemmon Survey	·	1.4 km	MPC · JPL
895870	2025 MO_{127}	—	April 11, 2016	Haleakala	Pan-STARRS 1	·	920 m	MPC · JPL
895871	2025 MJ_{165}	—	October 30, 2017	Haleakala	Pan-STARRS 1	·	1.4 km	MPC · JPL
895872	2025 MH_{234}	—	July 29, 2020	Haleakala	Pan-STARRS 1	·	1.4 km	MPC · JPL
895873	2025 MO_{236}	—	September 29, 2006	Apache Point	SDSS Collaboration	·	1.2 km	MPC · JPL
895874	2025 MT_{299}	—	September 24, 2005	Kitt Peak	Spacewatch	·	730 m	MPC · JPL
895875	2025 MG_{301}	—	January 23, 2020	Haleakala	Pan-STARRS 1	·	650 m	MPC · JPL
895876	2025 MR_{346}	—	July 19, 2015	Haleakala	Pan-STARRS 1	·	1.2 km	MPC · JPL
895877	2025 NR_{12}	—	February 29, 2012	Mount Graham	K. Černis, R. P. Boyle	·	750 m	MPC · JPL
895878	2025 NF_{36}	—	October 31, 2005	Apache Point	SDSS Collaboration	·	1.7 km	MPC · JPL
895879	2025 NW_{78}	—	February 27, 2014	Haleakala	Pan-STARRS 1	·	1.4 km	MPC · JPL
895880	2025 NV_{103}	—	January 20, 2018	Haleakala	Pan-STARRS 1	·	1.6 km	MPC · JPL
895881	2025 NW_{120}	—	January 29, 2011	Mount Lemmon	Mount Lemmon Survey	·	810 m	MPC · JPL
895882	2025 NQ_{153}	—	September 12, 2006	Apache Point	SDSS Collaboration	·	1.3 km	MPC · JPL
895883	2025 NO_{162}	—	January 9, 2006	Kitt Peak	Spacewatch	·	2.0 km	MPC · JPL
895884	2025 OL_{8}	—	February 9, 2016	Haleakala	Pan-STARRS 1	·	930 m	MPC · JPL
895885	2025 OZ_{17}	—	March 17, 2015	Haleakala	Pan-STARRS 1	·	1.4 km	MPC · JPL
895886	2025 OX_{82}	—	October 9, 2007	Mount Lemmon	Mount Lemmon Survey	·	1.5 km	MPC · JPL
895887	2025 OO_{229}	—	February 23, 2007	Kitt Peak	Spacewatch	·	1.7 km	MPC · JPL
895888	2025 OY_{241}	—	September 21, 2011	Mount Lemmon	Mount Lemmon Survey	·	1.3 km	MPC · JPL
895889	2025 OM_{281}	—	February 14, 2013	Haleakala	Pan-STARRS 1	·	1.3 km	MPC · JPL
895890	2025 OX_{281}	—	October 2, 2014	Haleakala	Pan-STARRS 1	·	1.8 km	MPC · JPL
895891	2025 OQ_{289}	—	February 25, 2007	Kitt Peak	Spacewatch	·	1.7 km	MPC · JPL
895892	2025 OZ_{291}	—	April 11, 2008	Kitt Peak	Spacewatch	·	1.2 km	MPC · JPL
895893	2025 OQ_{331}	—	October 9, 2007	Mount Lemmon	Mount Lemmon Survey	·	1.2 km	MPC · JPL
895894	2025 OA_{351}	—	October 18, 2011	Mount Lemmon	Mount Lemmon Survey	·	1.2 km	MPC · JPL
895895	2025 OP_{351}	—	February 10, 2011	Mount Lemmon	Mount Lemmon Survey	·	2.0 km	MPC · JPL
895896	2025 PZ_{22}	—	October 12, 2009	Mount Lemmon	Mount Lemmon Survey	·	640 m	MPC · JPL
895897	2025 PG_{137}	—	April 23, 2015	Haleakala	Pan-STARRS 1	·	1.1 km	MPC · JPL
895898	2025 QZ_{35}	—	March 13, 2013	Mount Lemmon	Mount Lemmon Survey	·	880 m	MPC · JPL
895899	2025 QW_{39}	—	August 30, 2025	La Palma-Liverpool	Romanov, F. D.	·	830 m	MPC · JPL
895900	2025 UX_{112}	—	July 22, 2015	Subaru Telescope,	Subaru Telescope	·	1.1 km	MPC · JPL

== 895901–896000 ==
back to top

Designation			Discovery			Properties		Ref
Permanent	Provisional	Named after	Date	Site	Discoverer(s)	Category	Diam.	Ref
895901	2025 UN_{142}	—	July 1, 2019	Haleakala	Pan-STARRS 1	·	1.5 km	MPC · JPL
895902	2025 VS_{13}	—	August 4, 2008	Siding Spring	SSS	·	480 m	MPC · JPL
895903	2025 YF_{22}	—	November 4, 2010	Mount Lemmon	Mount Lemmon Survey	L4	5.5 km	MPC · JPL
895904	2026 AR_{8}	—	January 14, 2011	Mount Lemmon	Mount Lemmon Survey	·	710 m	MPC · JPL
895905	2026 AP_{15}	—	November 6, 2008	Mount Lemmon	Mount Lemmon Survey	·	1.5 km	MPC · JPL
895906	2026 AD_{16}	—	February 27, 2012	Haleakala	Pan-STARRS 1	·	590 m	MPC · JPL
895907	2026 BK_{13}	—	January 20, 2026	Haleakala	Pan-STARRS 2	·	50 km	MPC · JPL
895908	2026 DL_{13}	—	February 3, 2012	Haleakala	Pan-STARRS 1	·	1.1 km	MPC · JPL
895909	2026 DA_{16}	—	March 22, 2017	Haleakala	Pan-STARRS 1	·	1.6 km	MPC · JPL
895910	2026 DM_{18}	—	September 27, 2006	Kitt Peak	Spacewatch	·	610 m	MPC · JPL

back to top

== See also ==
- Meanings of minor-planet names: 895001–896000
