= P/2021 U3 (Attard–Maury) =

Periodic comet

P/2021 U3 (Attard-Maury)
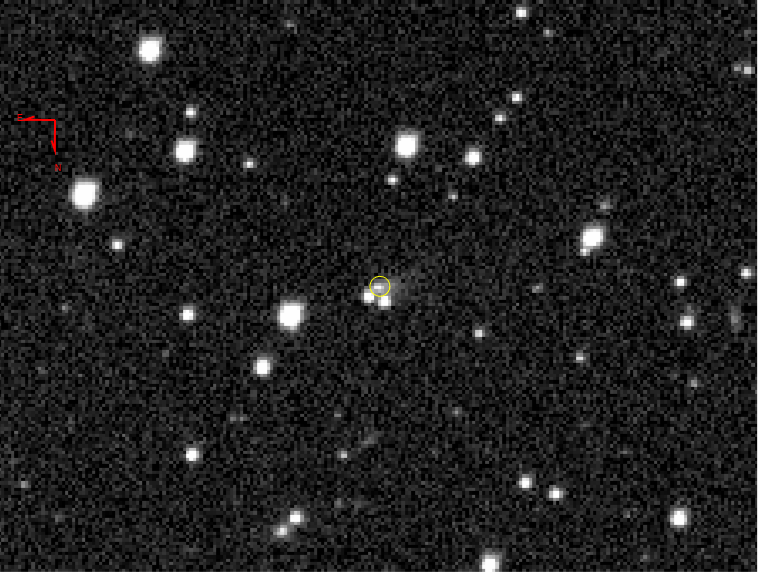
- The comet imaged from the Zwicky Transient Facility on 19 November 2021

Discovery
- Discovered by: Georges Attard; Alain Maury
- Discovery date: 24 October 2021

Orbital characteristics
- Epoch: 24 November 2021 (JD 2459542.5)
- Observation arc: 99 days
- Number of observations: 275
- Aphelion: 6.497 AU
- Perihelion: 1.887 AU
- Semi-major axis: 4.192 AU
- Eccentricity: 0.54991
- Orbital period: 8.583 years
- Inclination: 69.693°
- Longitude of ascending node: 75.113°
- Argument of periapsis: 335.21°
- Mean anomaly: 3.461°
- Last perihelion: 24 October 2021
- Next perihelion: 1 June 2030
- T_{Jupiter}: 1.755
- Earth MOID: 0.947 AU
- Jupiter MOID: 0.487 AU
- Comet total magnitude (M1): 16.8

P/2021 U3 (Attard–Maury) is a Jupiter-family comet discovered on 24 October 2021 by Georges Attard and Alain Maury. The comet had a magnitude of 19 at the time of its discovery. It is the second comet discovered using the synthetic tracking technique, using the Tycho software, as part of the MAP Observation Program.

== Discovery ==
The comet was discovered on 24 October 2021 by Georges Attard, an amateur astronomer from Mougins, and Alain Maury, a former astronomer at the CERGA and the Palomar Observatory, now director of the astronomical resources center Space in San Pedro de Atacama, Chile.

== Method and Observation Program ==
To detect near-Earth objects, Alain Maury, Georges Attard, and Daniel Parrott designed the MAP project. This project is based on a method, observation telescopes, processing software, and of course, diligent observers.

== Characteristics ==
The orbital period is 8.58 years. The aphelion is 6.56 AU, close to the orbit of Jupiter.

== See also ==
- C/2021 J1 (Maury–Attard)

== Bibliography ==
- Ernesto Guido (2 November 2021). "New Comet P/2021 U3 (Attard-Maury)". Blog of Italian amateur astronomer Ernesto Guido. Guido-02112021..
