= C/2021 J1 (Maury–Attard) =

Halley-type comet

Discovery
- Discovered by: Alain Maury; Georges Attard
- Discovery date: 9 May 2021

Orbital characteristics
- Epoch: 27 April 2021 (JD 2,459,331.5)
- Observation arc: 124 days
- Number of observations: 106
- Aphelion: 51.31 AU
- Perihelion: 1.741 AU
- Semi-major axis: 26.53 AU
- Eccentricity: 0.934
- Orbital period: 135±2 years
- Inclination: 92.719°
- Longitude of ascending node: 88.320°
- Argument of periapsis: 147.33°
- Mean anomaly: 0.479°
- Last perihelion: 19 February 2021
- Next perihelion: ~2154
- T_{Jupiter}: 0.120
- Earth MOID: 0.826 AU
- Jupiter MOID: 2.959 AU
- Comet total magnitude (M1): 17.1

C/2021 J1 (Maury–Attard) is a Halley-type comet discovered on 9 May 2021, by French amateur astronomers Alain Maury and Georges Attard with the MAP (Maury/Attard/Parrott) observation program. It is the first comet discovered with the synthetic tracking technique, made possible with the Tycho Tracker commercial software developed by Daniel Parrott. When it was discovered, it had a magnitude of 19.

It has a 124-day observation arc. It came to perihelion on 19 February 2021. The next perihelion will be in early 2154.

== See also ==
- P/2021 U3 (Attard–Maury)
