= Alain Maury =

French astronomer (born 1958)

Asteroids discovered: 8
3838 Epona	November 27, 1986
4404 Enirac	April 2, 1987
4482 Frèrebasile	September 1, 1986
4558 Janesick (with J. Mueller)	July 12, 1988
5370 Taranis	September 2, 1986
11284 Belenus	January 21, 1990
21001 Trogrlic	April 1, 1987
120452 Schombert	July 6, 1988

Alain J. Maury (born 1958) is a French astronomer who has discovered numerous asteroids.

He discovered the periodic comet 115P/Maury as well as the non-periodic C/1988 C1 (Maury-Phinney).

He has discovered a number of asteroids, including the Apollo asteroid 3838 Epona and the Amor asteroids 11284 Belenus and 5370 Taranis.

He participated in the OCA DLR Asteroid Survey (ODAS), which also discovered more than 2200 asteroids during its 30-month lifetime.

The asteroid 3780 Maury was named in his honor.

Since 2003, Maury and his wife Alejandra have operated their own observatory near San Pedro de Atacama in Northern Chile. There, they give tours introducing visitors to the night sky in order to finance their own research and further public interest in astronomy.
