= List of minor planets: 801001–802000 =

The following is a partial list of minor planets, running from minor-planet number 801001 through 802000, inclusive. The primary data for this and other partial lists is based on JPL's "Small-Body Orbital Elements" and data available from the Minor Planet Center. Critical list information is also provided by the MPC, unless otherwise specified from Lowell Observatory. A detailed description of the table's columns and additional sources are given on the main page including a complete list of every page in this series, and a statistical break-up on the dynamical classification of minor planets.

Also see the summary list of all named bodies in numerical and alphabetical order, and the corresponding naming citations for the number range of this particular list. New namings may only be added to this list after official publication, as the preannouncement of names is condemned by the Working Group for Small Bodies Nomenclature of the International Astronomical Union.

Near-Earth obj.	MBA (inner)	MBA (outer)	Centaur
Mars-crosser	MBA (middle)	Jupiter trojan	Trans-Neptunian obj.
Unclassified

== 801001–801100 ==
Designation			Discovery			Properties		Ref
Permanent	Provisional	Named after	Date	Site	Discoverer(s)	Category	Diam.	Ref
801001	2014 NX_{51}	—	June 29, 2014	Haleakala	Pan-STARRS 1	·	1.1 km	MPC · JPL
801002	2014 NE_{60}	—	June 26, 2014	Haleakala	Pan-STARRS 1	EUN	1.1 km	MPC · JPL
801003	2014 NO_{61}	—	June 27, 2014	Haleakala	Pan-STARRS 1	·	1.2 km	MPC · JPL
801004	2014 NA_{66}	—	July 7, 2014	Haleakala	Pan-STARRS 1	cubewano (hot)	171 km	MPC · JPL
801005	2014 NF_{71}	—	July 7, 2014	Haleakala	Pan-STARRS 1	·	720 m	MPC · JPL
801006	2014 NQ_{72}	—	July 8, 2014	Haleakala	Pan-STARRS 1	·	1.2 km	MPC · JPL
801007 Stefanpopcot	2014 NB_{80}	Stefanpopcot	July 10, 2014	Roque de los Muchachos	EURONEAR	·	2.0 km	MPC · JPL
801008	2014 NG_{80}	—	July 2, 2014	Haleakala	Pan-STARRS 1	·	1.8 km	MPC · JPL
801009	2014 NH_{80}	—	July 8, 2014	Haleakala	Pan-STARRS 1	WIT	700 m	MPC · JPL
801010	2014 NG_{84}	—	July 4, 2014	Haleakala	Pan-STARRS 1	·	2.6 km	MPC · JPL
801011	2014 NM_{86}	—	January 28, 2017	Haleakala	Pan-STARRS 1	·	780 m	MPC · JPL
801012	2014 NN_{86}	—	July 1, 2014	Haleakala	Pan-STARRS 1	EOS	1.4 km	MPC · JPL
801013	2014 NY_{87}	—	July 8, 2014	Haleakala	Pan-STARRS 1	·	1.0 km	MPC · JPL
801014	2014 NJ_{91}	—	July 1, 2014	Haleakala	Pan-STARRS 1	·	1.8 km	MPC · JPL
801015	2014 NL_{97}	—	July 4, 2014	Haleakala	Pan-STARRS 1	·	760 m	MPC · JPL
801016	2014 NO_{98}	—	December 4, 2010	Mount Lemmon	Mount Lemmon Survey	·	2.2 km	MPC · JPL
801017	2014 NK_{99}	—	July 2, 2014	Haleakala	Pan-STARRS 1	·	1.1 km	MPC · JPL
801018	2014 OK_{12}	—	July 25, 2014	Haleakala	Pan-STARRS 1	KOR	970 m	MPC · JPL
801019	2014 OX_{16}	—	February 18, 2013	Kitt Peak	Spacewatch	·	1.4 km	MPC · JPL
801020	2014 OV_{17}	—	July 25, 2014	Haleakala	Pan-STARRS 1	HOF	1.7 km	MPC · JPL
801021	2014 OP_{18}	—	July 25, 2014	Haleakala	Pan-STARRS 1	·	1.5 km	MPC · JPL
801022	2014 OZ_{20}	—	October 8, 2005	Kitt Peak	Spacewatch	KOR	880 m	MPC · JPL
801023	2014 OC_{30}	—	July 25, 2014	Haleakala	Pan-STARRS 1	·	1.3 km	MPC · JPL
801024	2014 OK_{30}	—	November 9, 2009	Mount Lemmon	Mount Lemmon Survey	·	2.4 km	MPC · JPL
801025	2014 OH_{36}	—	January 16, 2009	Kitt Peak	Spacewatch	·	810 m	MPC · JPL
801026	2014 OA_{37}	—	July 25, 2014	Haleakala	Pan-STARRS 1	·	680 m	MPC · JPL
801027	2014 OC_{38}	—	July 3, 2014	Haleakala	Pan-STARRS 1	·	820 m	MPC · JPL
801028	2014 OH_{38}	—	December 16, 2007	Mount Lemmon	Mount Lemmon Survey	·	1.2 km	MPC · JPL
801029	2014 OX_{41}	—	February 3, 2012	Mount Lemmon	Mount Lemmon Survey	EOS	1.4 km	MPC · JPL
801030	2014 OP_{45}	—	November 11, 2006	Mount Lemmon	Mount Lemmon Survey	·	1.0 km	MPC · JPL
801031	2014 OV_{49}	—	September 2, 2010	Mount Lemmon	Mount Lemmon Survey	·	1.2 km	MPC · JPL
801032	2014 OX_{49}	—	July 25, 2014	Haleakala	Pan-STARRS 1	·	790 m	MPC · JPL
801033	2014 OP_{51}	—	November 30, 2011	Mount Lemmon	Mount Lemmon Survey	·	1.1 km	MPC · JPL
801034	2014 OY_{63}	—	July 25, 2014	Haleakala	Pan-STARRS 1	·	720 m	MPC · JPL
801035	2014 OC_{70}	—	July 25, 2014	Haleakala	Pan-STARRS 1	·	1.4 km	MPC · JPL
801036	2014 OZ_{76}	—	July 26, 2014	Haleakala	Pan-STARRS 1	·	1.5 km	MPC · JPL
801037	2014 OB_{85}	—	July 26, 2014	Haleakala	Pan-STARRS 1	·	1.5 km	MPC · JPL
801038	2014 OE_{87}	—	April 16, 2013	Cerro Tololo-DECam	DECam	·	990 m	MPC · JPL
801039	2014 OY_{98}	—	July 26, 2014	Haleakala	Pan-STARRS 1	MAR	780 m	MPC · JPL
801040	2014 OJ_{99}	—	July 26, 2014	Haleakala	Pan-STARRS 1	·	1.8 km	MPC · JPL
801041	2014 ON_{112}	—	July 24, 2014	Tivoli	G. Lehmann, A. Knöfel	·	1.3 km	MPC · JPL
801042	2014 OR_{113}	—	August 28, 2006	Kitt Peak	Spacewatch	·	920 m	MPC · JPL
801043	2014 OK_{119}	—	July 25, 2014	Haleakala	Pan-STARRS 1	·	1.2 km	MPC · JPL
801044	2014 OH_{128}	—	April 16, 2013	Cerro Tololo-DECam	DECam	WIT	560 m	MPC · JPL
801045	2014 OW_{129}	—	July 26, 2014	Haleakala	Pan-STARRS 1	MRX	790 m	MPC · JPL
801046	2014 OZ_{132}	—	July 27, 2014	Haleakala	Pan-STARRS 1	·	990 m	MPC · JPL
801047	2014 OK_{137}	—	September 15, 2006	Kitt Peak	Spacewatch	·	880 m	MPC · JPL
801048	2014 OL_{137}	—	October 31, 2010	Mount Lemmon	Mount Lemmon Survey	·	1.3 km	MPC · JPL
801049	2014 OD_{140}	—	June 27, 2014	Haleakala	Pan-STARRS 1	·	920 m	MPC · JPL
801050	2014 ON_{148}	—	July 27, 2014	Haleakala	Pan-STARRS 1	·	1.0 km	MPC · JPL
801051	2014 OZ_{151}	—	September 29, 2010	Mount Lemmon	Mount Lemmon Survey	·	1.3 km	MPC · JPL
801052	2014 OA_{162}	—	July 27, 2014	Haleakala	Pan-STARRS 1	·	910 m	MPC · JPL
801053	2014 OM_{163}	—	July 27, 2014	Haleakala	Pan-STARRS 1	·	2.1 km	MPC · JPL
801054	2014 OR_{165}	—	July 3, 2014	Haleakala	Pan-STARRS 1	·	940 m	MPC · JPL
801055	2014 OF_{170}	—	February 13, 2013	Haleakala	Pan-STARRS 1	·	1.1 km	MPC · JPL
801056	2014 OT_{174}	—	July 27, 2014	Haleakala	Pan-STARRS 1	HOF	1.8 km	MPC · JPL
801057	2014 OK_{176}	—	July 27, 2014	Haleakala	Pan-STARRS 1	·	820 m	MPC · JPL
801058	2014 OF_{187}	—	July 27, 2014	Haleakala	Pan-STARRS 1	EUN	860 m	MPC · JPL
801059	2014 OD_{209}	—	January 17, 2007	Kitt Peak	Spacewatch	·	1.8 km	MPC · JPL
801060	2014 OB_{212}	—	July 25, 2014	Cala d'Hort	I. de la Cueva, J. L. Ferrer	HNS	880 m	MPC · JPL
801061	2014 OV_{214}	—	July 27, 2014	Haleakala	Pan-STARRS 1	·	1.0 km	MPC · JPL
801062	2014 OR_{216}	—	July 27, 2014	Haleakala	Pan-STARRS 1	·	1.4 km	MPC · JPL
801063	2014 OH_{232}	—	July 7, 2010	Kitt Peak	Spacewatch	·	1.1 km	MPC · JPL
801064	2014 OX_{232}	—	September 3, 2010	Mount Lemmon	Mount Lemmon Survey	·	1.3 km	MPC · JPL
801065	2014 OK_{236}	—	May 7, 2014	Haleakala	Pan-STARRS 1	·	2.1 km	MPC · JPL
801066	2014 OB_{237}	—	April 10, 2014	Haleakala	Pan-STARRS 1	·	2.1 km	MPC · JPL
801067	2014 OM_{241}	—	June 2, 2014	Mount Lemmon	Mount Lemmon Survey	·	890 m	MPC · JPL
801068	2014 OD_{245}	—	July 8, 2014	Haleakala	Pan-STARRS 1	RAF	770 m	MPC · JPL
801069	2014 OF_{247}	—	July 29, 2014	Haleakala	Pan-STARRS 1	·	1.7 km	MPC · JPL
801070	2014 OP_{249}	—	July 29, 2014	Haleakala	Pan-STARRS 1	·	1.2 km	MPC · JPL
801071	2014 OF_{255}	—	February 11, 2012	Mount Lemmon	Mount Lemmon Survey	·	1.6 km	MPC · JPL
801072	2014 OJ_{256}	—	July 29, 2014	Haleakala	Pan-STARRS 1	·	1.3 km	MPC · JPL
801073	2014 OD_{258}	—	July 29, 2014	Haleakala	Pan-STARRS 1	·	1.4 km	MPC · JPL
801074	2014 OE_{259}	—	July 3, 2014	Haleakala	Pan-STARRS 1	·	1.1 km	MPC · JPL
801075	2014 OH_{262}	—	July 29, 2014	Haleakala	Pan-STARRS 1	·	2.6 km	MPC · JPL
801076	2014 OB_{269}	—	July 4, 2014	Haleakala	Pan-STARRS 1	·	1.3 km	MPC · JPL
801077	2014 OC_{269}	—	July 29, 2014	Haleakala	Pan-STARRS 1	·	1.0 km	MPC · JPL
801078	2014 OM_{272}	—	July 29, 2014	Haleakala	Pan-STARRS 1	EOS	1.3 km	MPC · JPL
801079	2014 OV_{278}	—	July 29, 2014	Haleakala	Pan-STARRS 1	EOS	1.3 km	MPC · JPL
801080	2014 OG_{286}	—	July 29, 2014	Haleakala	Pan-STARRS 1	·	1.1 km	MPC · JPL
801081	2014 OU_{286}	—	July 29, 2014	Haleakala	Pan-STARRS 1	·	2.2 km	MPC · JPL
801082	2014 OZ_{299}	—	June 12, 2014	Haleakala	Pan-STARRS 1	·	1.3 km	MPC · JPL
801083	2014 OG_{304}	—	August 29, 2009	Kitt Peak	Spacewatch	THM	1.6 km	MPC · JPL
801084	2014 OM_{305}	—	July 25, 2014	Haleakala	Pan-STARRS 1	·	950 m	MPC · JPL
801085	2014 OT_{305}	—	July 25, 2014	Haleakala	Pan-STARRS 1	·	1.2 km	MPC · JPL
801086	2014 OR_{306}	—	July 25, 2014	Haleakala	Pan-STARRS 1	TIR	1.7 km	MPC · JPL
801087	2014 OH_{308}	—	July 27, 2014	Haleakala	Pan-STARRS 1	·	1.3 km	MPC · JPL
801088	2014 OF_{314}	—	June 30, 2014	Haleakala	Pan-STARRS 1	·	1.2 km	MPC · JPL
801089	2014 OQ_{321}	—	December 2, 2010	Mount Lemmon	Mount Lemmon Survey	·	1.9 km	MPC · JPL
801090	2014 OP_{323}	—	January 19, 2012	Kitt Peak	Spacewatch	·	1.9 km	MPC · JPL
801091	2014 OB_{324}	—	July 29, 2014	Haleakala	Pan-STARRS 1	·	1.3 km	MPC · JPL
801092	2014 OH_{325}	—	September 1, 2010	Mount Lemmon	Mount Lemmon Survey	(29841)	850 m	MPC · JPL
801093	2014 OW_{326}	—	June 27, 2014	Haleakala	Pan-STARRS 1	·	1.1 km	MPC · JPL
801094	2014 OP_{331}	—	July 27, 2014	Haleakala	Pan-STARRS 1	·	1.1 km	MPC · JPL
801095	2014 ON_{345}	—	February 2, 2008	Kitt Peak	Spacewatch	·	960 m	MPC · JPL
801096	2014 OG_{347}	—	July 4, 2014	Haleakala	Pan-STARRS 1	BRA	940 m	MPC · JPL
801097	2014 OH_{348}	—	July 28, 2014	Haleakala	Pan-STARRS 1	·	1.2 km	MPC · JPL
801098	2014 OV_{350}	—	July 4, 2014	Haleakala	Pan-STARRS 1	·	1.6 km	MPC · JPL
801099	2014 OQ_{352}	—	July 28, 2014	Haleakala	Pan-STARRS 1	EOS	1.2 km	MPC · JPL
801100	2014 OP_{368}	—	July 27, 2014	Haleakala	Pan-STARRS 1	·	880 m	MPC · JPL

== 801101–801200 ==
back to top

Designation			Discovery			Properties		Ref
Permanent	Provisional	Named after	Date	Site	Discoverer(s)	Category	Diam.	Ref
801101	2014 OD_{370}	—	July 30, 2014	Kitt Peak	Spacewatch	MAS	640 m	MPC · JPL
801102	2014 OZ_{376}	—	July 25, 2014	Haleakala	Pan-STARRS 1	·	940 m	MPC · JPL
801103	2014 OL_{385}	—	July 2, 2014	Haleakala	Pan-STARRS 1	·	2.0 km	MPC · JPL
801104	2014 ON_{390}	—	July 29, 2014	Haleakala	Pan-STARRS 1	BAR	1.1 km	MPC · JPL
801105	2014 OC_{397}	—	July 25, 2014	Haleakala	Pan-STARRS 1	·	1.1 km	MPC · JPL
801106	2014 ON_{398}	—	July 31, 2014	Haleakala	Pan-STARRS 1	·	1.1 km	MPC · JPL
801107	2014 OC_{399}	—	November 29, 2005	Mount Lemmon	Mount Lemmon Survey	KOR	940 m	MPC · JPL
801108	2014 OG_{405}	—	July 25, 2014	Haleakala	Pan-STARRS 1	·	1.3 km	MPC · JPL
801109	2014 OV_{405}	—	July 25, 2014	Haleakala	Pan-STARRS 1	·	1.3 km	MPC · JPL
801110	2014 OP_{406}	—	July 25, 2014	Haleakala	Pan-STARRS 1	(895)	2.1 km	MPC · JPL
801111	2014 OF_{409}	—	July 25, 2014	Haleakala	Pan-STARRS 1	·	1.4 km	MPC · JPL
801112	2014 OJ_{410}	—	July 27, 2014	Haleakala	Pan-STARRS 1	·	1.4 km	MPC · JPL
801113	2014 OT_{410}	—	July 28, 2014	Haleakala	Pan-STARRS 1	·	1.3 km	MPC · JPL
801114	2014 OC_{414}	—	November 8, 2010	Mount Lemmon	Mount Lemmon Survey	·	1.1 km	MPC · JPL
801115	2014 OP_{416}	—	July 28, 2014	Haleakala	Pan-STARRS 1	JUN	690 m	MPC · JPL
801116	2014 OH_{418}	—	July 28, 2014	Haleakala	Pan-STARRS 1	KOR	1.0 km	MPC · JPL
801117	2014 OD_{422}	—	July 29, 2014	Haleakala	Pan-STARRS 1	·	920 m	MPC · JPL
801118	2014 OT_{422}	—	July 25, 2014	Haleakala	Pan-STARRS 1	·	1.4 km	MPC · JPL
801119	2014 OP_{432}	—	July 27, 2014	Haleakala	Pan-STARRS 1	·	1.1 km	MPC · JPL
801120	2014 OT_{433}	—	July 26, 2014	Haleakala	Pan-STARRS 1	MAR	720 m	MPC · JPL
801121	2014 OW_{435}	—	July 29, 2014	Haleakala	Pan-STARRS 1	·	1.5 km	MPC · JPL
801122	2014 OO_{437}	—	July 28, 2014	Haleakala	Pan-STARRS 1	·	1.4 km	MPC · JPL
801123	2014 OD_{440}	—	July 31, 2014	Haleakala	Pan-STARRS 1	EOS	1.5 km	MPC · JPL
801124	2014 OG_{440}	—	July 25, 2014	Haleakala	Pan-STARRS 1	·	1.0 km	MPC · JPL
801125	2014 OA_{441}	—	July 31, 2014	Haleakala	Pan-STARRS 1	·	950 m	MPC · JPL
801126	2014 OR_{441}	—	July 29, 2014	Haleakala	Pan-STARRS 1	·	2.0 km	MPC · JPL
801127	2014 OK_{444}	—	July 25, 2014	Haleakala	Pan-STARRS 1	·	1.3 km	MPC · JPL
801128	2014 OM_{447}	—	July 28, 2014	Haleakala	Pan-STARRS 1	·	1.8 km	MPC · JPL
801129	2014 OV_{447}	—	July 30, 2014	Haleakala	Pan-STARRS 1	·	800 m	MPC · JPL
801130	2014 OB_{448}	—	July 28, 2014	Haleakala	Pan-STARRS 1	·	830 m	MPC · JPL
801131	2014 OZ_{452}	—	July 28, 2014	Haleakala	Pan-STARRS 1	KOR	990 m	MPC · JPL
801132	2014 OD_{453}	—	July 25, 2014	Haleakala	Pan-STARRS 1	EOS	1.4 km	MPC · JPL
801133	2014 OX_{460}	—	July 25, 2014	Haleakala	Pan-STARRS 1	·	1.2 km	MPC · JPL
801134	2014 OE_{462}	—	July 31, 2014	Haleakala	Pan-STARRS 1	·	1.1 km	MPC · JPL
801135	2014 OQ_{464}	—	July 28, 2014	Haleakala	Pan-STARRS 1	·	1.6 km	MPC · JPL
801136	2014 OZ_{465}	—	February 11, 2008	Mount Lemmon	Mount Lemmon Survey	·	1.5 km	MPC · JPL
801137	2014 OO_{466}	—	July 25, 2014	Haleakala	Pan-STARRS 1	·	1.5 km	MPC · JPL
801138	2014 OO_{469}	—	July 30, 2014	Haleakala	Pan-STARRS 1	(5)	910 m	MPC · JPL
801139	2014 OE_{470}	—	July 25, 2014	Haleakala	Pan-STARRS 1	·	1.1 km	MPC · JPL
801140	2014 OE_{471}	—	July 25, 2014	Haleakala	Pan-STARRS 1	·	1.3 km	MPC · JPL
801141	2014 OM_{478}	—	July 25, 2014	Haleakala	Pan-STARRS 1	·	1.2 km	MPC · JPL
801142	2014 OX_{478}	—	July 28, 2014	Haleakala	Pan-STARRS 1	·	1.0 km	MPC · JPL
801143	2014 OA_{479}	—	July 28, 2014	Haleakala	Pan-STARRS 1	·	1.1 km	MPC · JPL
801144	2014 PH_{4}	—	August 4, 2014	Haleakala	Pan-STARRS 1	·	1.2 km	MPC · JPL
801145	2014 PU_{42}	—	July 28, 2014	Haleakala	Pan-STARRS 1	·	920 m	MPC · JPL
801146	2014 PC_{43}	—	August 4, 2014	Haleakala	Pan-STARRS 1	EUN	940 m	MPC · JPL
801147	2014 PW_{46}	—	June 26, 2014	Haleakala	Pan-STARRS 1	EUN	970 m	MPC · JPL
801148	2014 PR_{49}	—	November 9, 2007	Mount Lemmon	Mount Lemmon Survey	·	800 m	MPC · JPL
801149	2014 PE_{51}	—	August 4, 2014	Haleakala	Pan-STARRS 1	·	1.4 km	MPC · JPL
801150	2014 PX_{52}	—	September 16, 2010	Mount Lemmon	Mount Lemmon Survey	EUN	770 m	MPC · JPL
801151	2014 PZ_{55}	—	June 28, 2014	Mount Lemmon	Mount Lemmon Survey	MAR	800 m	MPC · JPL
801152	2014 PR_{57}	—	August 4, 2014	Cala d'Hort	I. de la Cueva, J. L. Ferrer	·	1.2 km	MPC · JPL
801153	2014 PC_{66}	—	July 1, 2014	Haleakala	Pan-STARRS 1	·	1.8 km	MPC · JPL
801154	2014 PS_{71}	—	August 3, 2014	Haleakala	Pan-STARRS 1	MAR	740 m	MPC · JPL
801155	2014 PG_{72}	—	August 3, 2014	Haleakala	Pan-STARRS 1	·	1.2 km	MPC · JPL
801156	2014 PW_{73}	—	August 3, 2014	Haleakala	Pan-STARRS 1	THM	1.5 km	MPC · JPL
801157	2014 PZ_{74}	—	May 12, 2013	Haleakala	Pan-STARRS 1	·	2.1 km	MPC · JPL
801158	2014 PH_{75}	—	August 3, 2014	Haleakala	Pan-STARRS 1	·	920 m	MPC · JPL
801159	2014 PA_{76}	—	August 3, 2014	Haleakala	Pan-STARRS 1	·	1.2 km	MPC · JPL
801160	2014 PG_{83}	—	August 3, 2014	Haleakala	Pan-STARRS 1	·	1.6 km	MPC · JPL
801161	2014 PM_{87}	—	August 6, 2014	Kitt Peak	Spacewatch	·	940 m	MPC · JPL
801162	2014 PH_{88}	—	August 3, 2014	Haleakala	Pan-STARRS 1	·	1.2 km	MPC · JPL
801163	2014 PL_{90}	—	August 3, 2014	Haleakala	Pan-STARRS 1	HNS	650 m	MPC · JPL
801164	2014 PM_{93}	—	August 15, 2014	Haleakala	Pan-STARRS 1	·	1.5 km	MPC · JPL
801165	2014 PT_{94}	—	August 5, 2014	Haleakala	Pan-STARRS 1	·	910 m	MPC · JPL
801166	2014 PF_{96}	—	August 3, 2014	Haleakala	Pan-STARRS 1	·	1.3 km	MPC · JPL
801167	2014 PK_{96}	—	August 3, 2014	Haleakala	Pan-STARRS 1	·	2.4 km	MPC · JPL
801168	2014 PZ_{96}	—	August 3, 2014	Haleakala	Pan-STARRS 1	·	700 m	MPC · JPL
801169	2014 PF_{101}	—	August 3, 2014	Haleakala	Pan-STARRS 1	·	1.1 km	MPC · JPL
801170	2014 PG_{102}	—	August 5, 2014	Haleakala	Pan-STARRS 1	KOR	1.0 km	MPC · JPL
801171	2014 PQ_{103}	—	August 3, 2014	Haleakala	Pan-STARRS 1	·	940 m	MPC · JPL
801172	2014 QC_{6}	—	July 3, 2014	Haleakala	Pan-STARRS 1	·	1.0 km	MPC · JPL
801173	2014 QY_{6}	—	June 1, 2014	Haleakala	Pan-STARRS 1	·	1.1 km	MPC · JPL
801174	2014 QA_{7}	—	August 18, 2014	Haleakala	Pan-STARRS 1	HNS	760 m	MPC · JPL
801175	2014 QR_{8}	—	October 17, 2006	Kitt Peak	Spacewatch	·	810 m	MPC · JPL
801176	2014 QR_{22}	—	August 18, 2014	Haleakala	Pan-STARRS 1	·	1.2 km	MPC · JPL
801177	2014 QB_{29}	—	August 18, 2014	Haleakala	Pan-STARRS 1	·	1.3 km	MPC · JPL
801178	2014 QX_{50}	—	August 3, 2014	Haleakala	Pan-STARRS 1	(5)	880 m	MPC · JPL
801179	2014 QS_{64}	—	September 28, 2009	Mount Lemmon	Mount Lemmon Survey	·	1.9 km	MPC · JPL
801180	2014 QS_{66}	—	July 4, 2014	Haleakala	Pan-STARRS 1	·	2.3 km	MPC · JPL
801181	2014 QG_{70}	—	August 20, 2014	Haleakala	Pan-STARRS 1	EOS	1.2 km	MPC · JPL
801182	2014 QV_{70}	—	August 20, 2014	Haleakala	Pan-STARRS 1	·	2.2 km	MPC · JPL
801183	2014 QU_{73}	—	August 20, 2014	Haleakala	Pan-STARRS 1	·	1.5 km	MPC · JPL
801184	2014 QL_{82}	—	August 20, 2014	Haleakala	Pan-STARRS 1	EOS	1.1 km	MPC · JPL
801185	2014 QR_{83}	—	August 20, 2014	Haleakala	Pan-STARRS 1	·	970 m	MPC · JPL
801186	2014 QS_{88}	—	August 20, 2014	Haleakala	Pan-STARRS 1	·	1.8 km	MPC · JPL
801187	2014 QD_{95}	—	August 20, 2014	Haleakala	Pan-STARRS 1	·	2.2 km	MPC · JPL
801188	2014 QH_{123}	—	August 20, 2014	Haleakala	Pan-STARRS 1	·	2.1 km	MPC · JPL
801189	2014 QR_{127}	—	August 3, 2014	Haleakala	Pan-STARRS 1	·	830 m	MPC · JPL
801190	2014 QF_{130}	—	August 20, 2014	Haleakala	Pan-STARRS 1	·	2.2 km	MPC · JPL
801191	2014 QM_{130}	—	August 20, 2014	Haleakala	Pan-STARRS 1	·	1.2 km	MPC · JPL
801192	2014 QS_{130}	—	August 20, 2014	Haleakala	Pan-STARRS 1	·	570 m	MPC · JPL
801193	2014 QQ_{138}	—	September 15, 2010	Mount Lemmon	Mount Lemmon Survey	·	710 m	MPC · JPL
801194	2014 QF_{141}	—	August 20, 2014	Haleakala	Pan-STARRS 1	·	730 m	MPC · JPL
801195	2014 QH_{141}	—	July 28, 2014	Haleakala	Pan-STARRS 1	·	810 m	MPC · JPL
801196	2014 QO_{143}	—	March 8, 2013	Haleakala	Pan-STARRS 1	·	1.0 km	MPC · JPL
801197	2014 QF_{144}	—	August 20, 2014	Haleakala	Pan-STARRS 1	EOS	1.3 km	MPC · JPL
801198	2014 QN_{145}	—	August 12, 2010	Kitt Peak	Spacewatch	·	990 m	MPC · JPL
801199	2014 QX_{154}	—	June 27, 2014	Haleakala	Pan-STARRS 1	·	1.0 km	MPC · JPL
801200	2014 QU_{163}	—	July 29, 2014	Haleakala	Pan-STARRS 1	·	2.2 km	MPC · JPL

== 801201–801300 ==
back to top

Designation			Discovery			Properties		Ref
Permanent	Provisional	Named after	Date	Site	Discoverer(s)	Category	Diam.	Ref
801201	2014 QK_{175}	—	August 20, 2014	Haleakala	Pan-STARRS 1	·	950 m	MPC · JPL
801202	2014 QE_{177}	—	August 20, 2014	Haleakala	Pan-STARRS 1	(5)	780 m	MPC · JPL
801203	2014 QY_{186}	—	August 22, 2014	Haleakala	Pan-STARRS 1	EUN	600 m	MPC · JPL
801204	2014 QS_{188}	—	August 22, 2014	Haleakala	Pan-STARRS 1	·	1.0 km	MPC · JPL
801205	2014 QW_{188}	—	August 22, 2014	Haleakala	Pan-STARRS 1	HOF	1.6 km	MPC · JPL
801206	2014 QJ_{203}	—	October 28, 2010	Mount Lemmon	Mount Lemmon Survey	AGN	700 m	MPC · JPL
801207	2014 QM_{203}	—	August 22, 2014	Haleakala	Pan-STARRS 1	HOF	1.9 km	MPC · JPL
801208	2014 QN_{206}	—	March 25, 2007	Mount Lemmon	Mount Lemmon Survey	·	1.6 km	MPC · JPL
801209	2014 QD_{213}	—	August 22, 2014	Haleakala	Pan-STARRS 1	·	810 m	MPC · JPL
801210	2014 QO_{213}	—	August 22, 2014	Haleakala	Pan-STARRS 1	·	1.2 km	MPC · JPL
801211	2014 QA_{220}	—	August 22, 2014	Haleakala	Pan-STARRS 1	·	880 m	MPC · JPL
801212	2014 QG_{220}	—	August 13, 2010	Kitt Peak	Spacewatch	·	900 m	MPC · JPL
801213	2014 QJ_{221}	—	March 16, 2007	Mount Lemmon	Mount Lemmon Survey	·	1.9 km	MPC · JPL
801214	2014 QK_{223}	—	August 22, 2014	Haleakala	Pan-STARRS 1	THM	1.7 km	MPC · JPL
801215	2014 QD_{229}	—	August 20, 2014	Haleakala	Pan-STARRS 1	·	700 m	MPC · JPL
801216	2014 QF_{232}	—	February 1, 2006	Mount Lemmon	Mount Lemmon Survey	·	2.0 km	MPC · JPL
801217	2014 QO_{234}	—	September 25, 2009	Mount Lemmon	Mount Lemmon Survey	EOS	1.2 km	MPC · JPL
801218	2014 QO_{235}	—	August 22, 2014	Haleakala	Pan-STARRS 1	·	830 m	MPC · JPL
801219	2014 QN_{237}	—	May 8, 2013	Haleakala	Pan-STARRS 1	·	1.8 km	MPC · JPL
801220	2014 QD_{245}	—	August 22, 2014	Haleakala	Pan-STARRS 1	·	1.1 km	MPC · JPL
801221	2014 QX_{246}	—	August 22, 2014	Haleakala	Pan-STARRS 1	·	900 m	MPC · JPL
801222	2014 QX_{250}	—	August 22, 2014	Haleakala	Pan-STARRS 1	·	870 m	MPC · JPL
801223	2014 QO_{253}	—	August 22, 2014	Haleakala	Pan-STARRS 1	·	1.1 km	MPC · JPL
801224	2014 QD_{256}	—	August 22, 2014	Haleakala	Pan-STARRS 1	EUN	1.1 km	MPC · JPL
801225	2014 QJ_{256}	—	August 22, 2014	Haleakala	Pan-STARRS 1	615	1.0 km	MPC · JPL
801226	2014 QH_{257}	—	April 19, 2007	Kitt Peak	Spacewatch	·	1.9 km	MPC · JPL
801227	2014 QB_{258}	—	November 19, 2009	Mount Lemmon	Mount Lemmon Survey	·	1.9 km	MPC · JPL
801228	2014 QU_{258}	—	August 22, 2014	Haleakala	Pan-STARRS 1	·	1.6 km	MPC · JPL
801229	2014 QA_{259}	—	August 22, 2014	Haleakala	Pan-STARRS 1	KON	1.6 km	MPC · JPL
801230	2014 QM_{259}	—	August 22, 2014	Haleakala	Pan-STARRS 1	ADE	1.5 km	MPC · JPL
801231	2014 QB_{270}	—	November 12, 2010	Kitt Peak	Spacewatch	·	1.1 km	MPC · JPL
801232	2014 QD_{276}	—	September 28, 2011	Kitt Peak	Spacewatch	·	420 m	MPC · JPL
801233	2014 QD_{287}	—	August 25, 2014	Haleakala	Pan-STARRS 1	·	2.4 km	MPC · JPL
801234	2014 QN_{288}	—	August 25, 2014	Haleakala	Pan-STARRS 1	EUN	960 m	MPC · JPL
801235	2014 QR_{291}	—	August 25, 2014	Haleakala	Pan-STARRS 1	·	1.1 km	MPC · JPL
801236	2014 QN_{302}	—	August 21, 2014	Haleakala	Pan-STARRS 1	HOF	1.7 km	MPC · JPL
801237	2014 QQ_{302}	—	August 21, 2014	Haleakala	Pan-STARRS 1	·	780 m	MPC · JPL
801238	2014 QK_{304}	—	July 28, 2014	Haleakala	Pan-STARRS 1	·	1.2 km	MPC · JPL
801239	2014 QN_{314}	—	July 25, 2014	Haleakala	Pan-STARRS 1	KOR	980 m	MPC · JPL
801240	2014 QO_{314}	—	June 29, 2014	Haleakala	Pan-STARRS 1	·	1.4 km	MPC · JPL
801241	2014 QP_{320}	—	December 8, 2010	Kitt Peak	Spacewatch	·	1.7 km	MPC · JPL
801242	2014 QR_{329}	—	August 25, 2014	Haleakala	Pan-STARRS 1	(5)	1.1 km	MPC · JPL
801243	2014 QA_{331}	—	August 25, 2014	Haleakala	Pan-STARRS 1	·	1.9 km	MPC · JPL
801244	2014 QO_{344}	—	September 17, 2009	Mount Lemmon	Mount Lemmon Survey	EOS	1.2 km	MPC · JPL
801245	2014 QM_{347}	—	August 26, 2014	Haleakala	Pan-STARRS 1	·	1.0 km	MPC · JPL
801246	2014 QM_{351}	—	November 3, 2010	Kitt Peak	Spacewatch	·	1.0 km	MPC · JPL
801247	2014 QM_{363}	—	July 30, 2014	Kitt Peak	Spacewatch	·	1 km	MPC · JPL
801248	2014 QF_{366}	—	September 17, 2003	Campo Imperatore	CINEOS	·	2.5 km	MPC · JPL
801249	2014 QT_{368}	—	December 1, 2005	Mount Lemmon	Mount Lemmon Survey	EUN	920 m	MPC · JPL
801250	2014 QC_{385}	—	July 30, 2014	Haleakala	Pan-STARRS 1	·	1.0 km	MPC · JPL
801251	2014 QX_{386}	—	September 28, 2011	Kitt Peak	Spacewatch	·	520 m	MPC · JPL
801252	2014 QL_{388}	—	May 14, 2009	Kitt Peak	Spacewatch	·	1.1 km	MPC · JPL
801253	2014 QE_{396}	—	July 31, 2014	Haleakala	Pan-STARRS 1	·	1.4 km	MPC · JPL
801254	2014 QL_{400}	—	August 28, 2014	Haleakala	Pan-STARRS 1	·	1.3 km	MPC · JPL
801255	2014 QH_{403}	—	July 12, 2001	Palomar Mountain	NEAT	·	1.4 km	MPC · JPL
801256	2014 QW_{411}	—	August 30, 2014	Mount Lemmon	Mount Lemmon Survey	·	1.5 km	MPC · JPL
801257	2014 QK_{412}	—	August 20, 2014	Haleakala	Pan-STARRS 1	·	1.2 km	MPC · JPL
801258	2014 QQ_{415}	—	July 4, 2014	Haleakala	Pan-STARRS 1	·	500 m	MPC · JPL
801259	2014 QS_{424}	—	August 31, 2014	Mount Lemmon	Mount Lemmon Survey	·	2.0 km	MPC · JPL
801260	2014 QH_{435}	—	August 28, 2014	Haleakala	Pan-STARRS 1	ADE	1.0 km	MPC · JPL
801261	2014 QA_{445}	—	August 20, 2014	Haleakala	Pan-STARRS 1	MRX	820 m	MPC · JPL
801262	2014 QZ_{447}	—	August 20, 2014	Haleakala	Pan-STARRS 1	KOR	1.0 km	MPC · JPL
801263	2014 QR_{452}	—	August 27, 2014	Haleakala	Pan-STARRS 1	·	2.0 km	MPC · JPL
801264	2014 QE_{453}	—	February 14, 2013	Haleakala	Pan-STARRS 1	·	800 m	MPC · JPL
801265	2014 QR_{453}	—	August 22, 2014	Haleakala	Pan-STARRS 1	EOS	1.3 km	MPC · JPL
801266	2014 QZ_{455}	—	August 30, 2014	Kitt Peak	Spacewatch	·	1.4 km	MPC · JPL
801267	2014 QA_{456}	—	August 30, 2014	Kitt Peak	Spacewatch	·	1.6 km	MPC · JPL
801268	2014 QQ_{460}	—	August 20, 2014	Haleakala	Pan-STARRS 1	·	1.2 km	MPC · JPL
801269	2014 QF_{464}	—	August 23, 2014	Haleakala	Pan-STARRS 1	·	900 m	MPC · JPL
801270	2014 QT_{466}	—	August 25, 2014	Haleakala	Pan-STARRS 1	EUN	830 m	MPC · JPL
801271	2014 QP_{469}	—	August 28, 2014	Haleakala	Pan-STARRS 1	·	1.1 km	MPC · JPL
801272	2014 QU_{469}	—	August 28, 2014	Haleakala	Pan-STARRS 1	EOS	1.1 km	MPC · JPL
801273	2014 QA_{473}	—	August 31, 2014	Haleakala	Pan-STARRS 1	·	1.1 km	MPC · JPL
801274	2014 QU_{482}	—	August 20, 2014	Haleakala	Pan-STARRS 1	KOR	980 m	MPC · JPL
801275	2014 QO_{490}	—	April 20, 2013	Palomar Mountain	Palomar Transient Factory	·	1.2 km	MPC · JPL
801276	2014 QQ_{491}	—	August 19, 2006	Kitt Peak	Spacewatch	·	1.0 km	MPC · JPL
801277	2014 QK_{496}	—	August 30, 2014	Haleakala	Pan-STARRS 1	HNS	760 m	MPC · JPL
801278	2014 QN_{496}	—	August 22, 2014	Haleakala	Pan-STARRS 1	·	990 m	MPC · JPL
801279	2014 QJ_{497}	—	December 7, 2015	Haleakala	Pan-STARRS 1	·	850 m	MPC · JPL
801280	2014 QW_{497}	—	August 22, 2014	Haleakala	Pan-STARRS 1	JUN	720 m	MPC · JPL
801281	2014 QK_{499}	—	August 20, 2014	Haleakala	Pan-STARRS 1	·	1.2 km	MPC · JPL
801282	2014 QY_{499}	—	August 25, 2014	Haleakala	Pan-STARRS 1	·	1.2 km	MPC · JPL
801283	2014 QC_{501}	—	August 27, 2014	Haleakala	Pan-STARRS 1	HNS	720 m	MPC · JPL
801284	2014 QE_{502}	—	August 29, 2005	Kitt Peak	Spacewatch	·	1.1 km	MPC · JPL
801285	2014 QU_{507}	—	August 25, 2014	Haleakala	Pan-STARRS 1	RAF	580 m	MPC · JPL
801286	2014 QP_{509}	—	August 25, 2014	Haleakala	Pan-STARRS 1	·	820 m	MPC · JPL
801287	2014 QH_{512}	—	June 18, 2018	Haleakala	Pan-STARRS 1	·	1.1 km	MPC · JPL
801288	2014 QB_{515}	—	August 30, 2014	Mount Lemmon	Mount Lemmon Survey	·	1.2 km	MPC · JPL
801289	2014 QC_{517}	—	January 2, 2016	Haleakala	Pan-STARRS 1	·	1.1 km	MPC · JPL
801290	2014 QL_{517}	—	July 4, 2014	Haleakala	Pan-STARRS 1	·	1.4 km	MPC · JPL
801291	2014 QL_{518}	—	August 23, 2014	Haleakala	Pan-STARRS 1	·	1.2 km	MPC · JPL
801292	2014 QO_{521}	—	August 27, 2014	Haleakala	Pan-STARRS 1	·	1.2 km	MPC · JPL
801293	2014 QR_{522}	—	August 28, 2014	Haleakala	Pan-STARRS 1	·	1.4 km	MPC · JPL
801294	2014 QZ_{522}	—	August 25, 2014	Haleakala	Pan-STARRS 1	·	2.2 km	MPC · JPL
801295	2014 QA_{523}	—	August 22, 2014	Haleakala	Pan-STARRS 1	·	1.1 km	MPC · JPL
801296	2014 QD_{523}	—	August 28, 2014	Haleakala	Pan-STARRS 1	·	2.4 km	MPC · JPL
801297	2014 QH_{523}	—	August 29, 2014	Mount Lemmon	Mount Lemmon Survey	·	2.2 km	MPC · JPL
801298	2014 QM_{523}	—	August 28, 2014	Haleakala	Pan-STARRS 1	TEL	1.0 km	MPC · JPL
801299	2014 QS_{523}	—	August 20, 2014	Haleakala	Pan-STARRS 1	·	1.2 km	MPC · JPL
801300	2014 QH_{526}	—	August 31, 2014	Kitt Peak	Spacewatch	·	1.7 km	MPC · JPL

== 801301–801400 ==
back to top

Designation			Discovery			Properties		Ref
Permanent	Provisional	Named after	Date	Site	Discoverer(s)	Category	Diam.	Ref
801301	2014 QS_{530}	—	August 27, 2014	Haleakala	Pan-STARRS 1	·	1.0 km	MPC · JPL
801302	2014 QH_{534}	—	August 22, 2014	Haleakala	Pan-STARRS 1	·	1.1 km	MPC · JPL
801303	2014 QV_{537}	—	August 23, 2014	Haleakala	Pan-STARRS 1	EOS	1.4 km	MPC · JPL
801304	2014 QC_{539}	—	August 30, 2014	Mount Lemmon	Mount Lemmon Survey	·	1.4 km	MPC · JPL
801305	2014 QJ_{539}	—	August 22, 2014	Haleakala	Pan-STARRS 1	·	1.8 km	MPC · JPL
801306	2014 QA_{540}	—	August 25, 2014	Haleakala	Pan-STARRS 1	URS	2.4 km	MPC · JPL
801307	2014 QG_{540}	—	August 23, 2014	Haleakala	Pan-STARRS 1	·	1.9 km	MPC · JPL
801308	2014 QY_{540}	—	August 20, 2014	Haleakala	Pan-STARRS 1	·	1.5 km	MPC · JPL
801309	2014 QG_{544}	—	August 27, 2014	Haleakala	Pan-STARRS 1	·	2.0 km	MPC · JPL
801310	2014 QO_{544}	—	August 28, 2014	Haleakala	Pan-STARRS 1	·	2.1 km	MPC · JPL
801311	2014 QS_{546}	—	August 18, 2014	Haleakala	Pan-STARRS 1	·	2.4 km	MPC · JPL
801312	2014 QM_{547}	—	August 27, 2014	Haleakala	Pan-STARRS 1	·	900 m	MPC · JPL
801313	2014 QN_{549}	—	August 25, 2014	Haleakala	Pan-STARRS 1	HNS	700 m	MPC · JPL
801314	2014 QL_{551}	—	August 20, 2014	Haleakala	Pan-STARRS 1	·	720 m	MPC · JPL
801315	2014 QD_{555}	—	August 25, 2014	Haleakala	Pan-STARRS 1	HOF	1.9 km	MPC · JPL
801316	2014 QR_{555}	—	August 31, 2014	Haleakala	Pan-STARRS 1	·	970 m	MPC · JPL
801317	2014 QD_{561}	—	August 28, 2014	Haleakala	Pan-STARRS 1	·	1.2 km	MPC · JPL
801318	2014 QQ_{564}	—	August 20, 2014	Haleakala	Pan-STARRS 1	·	1.4 km	MPC · JPL
801319	2014 QR_{564}	—	August 30, 2014	Kitt Peak	Spacewatch	HNS	760 m	MPC · JPL
801320	2014 QU_{573}	—	August 22, 2014	Haleakala	Pan-STARRS 1	·	1.2 km	MPC · JPL
801321	2014 QG_{574}	—	August 31, 2014	Haleakala	Pan-STARRS 1	EOS	1.3 km	MPC · JPL
801322	2014 QL_{574}	—	August 23, 2014	Haleakala	Pan-STARRS 1	·	740 m	MPC · JPL
801323	2014 QK_{576}	—	August 28, 2014	Haleakala	Pan-STARRS 1	EOS	1.3 km	MPC · JPL
801324	2014 QS_{576}	—	August 22, 2014	Haleakala	Pan-STARRS 1	·	1.1 km	MPC · JPL
801325	2014 QN_{580}	—	August 20, 2014	Haleakala	Pan-STARRS 1	·	640 m	MPC · JPL
801326	2014 QF_{581}	—	August 20, 2014	Haleakala	Pan-STARRS 1	·	640 m	MPC · JPL
801327	2014 QS_{581}	—	August 22, 2014	Haleakala	Pan-STARRS 1	MAR	790 m	MPC · JPL
801328	2014 QP_{590}	—	August 20, 2014	Haleakala	Pan-STARRS 1	·	1.4 km	MPC · JPL
801329	2014 QK_{595}	—	August 22, 2014	Haleakala	Pan-STARRS 1	·	890 m	MPC · JPL
801330	2014 QW_{599}	—	August 20, 2014	Haleakala	Pan-STARRS 1	·	860 m	MPC · JPL
801331	2014 QW_{615}	—	August 23, 2014	Haleakala	Pan-STARRS 1	·	810 m	MPC · JPL
801332	2014 RH_{3}	—	September 1, 2014	Catalina	CSS	EUN	880 m	MPC · JPL
801333	2014 RS_{5}	—	September 1, 2014	Mount Lemmon	Mount Lemmon Survey	·	1.3 km	MPC · JPL
801334	2014 RP_{8}	—	September 2, 2014	Haleakala	Pan-STARRS 1	·	840 m	MPC · JPL
801335	2014 RV_{15}	—	September 2, 2014	Haleakala	Pan-STARRS 1	·	1.2 km	MPC · JPL
801336	2014 RN_{19}	—	July 28, 2014	Haleakala	Pan-STARRS 1	·	920 m	MPC · JPL
801337	2014 RA_{21}	—	July 7, 2014	Haleakala	Pan-STARRS 1	JUN	780 m	MPC · JPL
801338	2014 RW_{24}	—	February 26, 2008	Mount Lemmon	Mount Lemmon Survey	HNS	930 m	MPC · JPL
801339	2014 RD_{33}	—	July 28, 2014	Haleakala	Pan-STARRS 1	·	950 m	MPC · JPL
801340	2014 RT_{53}	—	August 3, 2014	Haleakala	Pan-STARRS 1	·	800 m	MPC · JPL
801341	2014 RR_{54}	—	October 12, 2010	Mount Lemmon	Mount Lemmon Survey	·	1.4 km	MPC · JPL
801342	2014 RP_{60}	—	September 11, 2014	Haleakala	Pan-STARRS 1	·	1.8 km	MPC · JPL
801343	2014 RE_{66}	—	September 26, 2008	Mount Lemmon	Mount Lemmon Survey	TIR	2.1 km	MPC · JPL
801344	2014 RR_{70}	—	September 2, 2014	Haleakala	Pan-STARRS 1	EUN	1.1 km	MPC · JPL
801345	2014 RW_{73}	—	September 2, 2014	Haleakala	Pan-STARRS 1	EUN	590 m	MPC · JPL
801346	2014 RP_{75}	—	September 14, 2014	Mount Lemmon	Mount Lemmon Survey	·	1.3 km	MPC · JPL
801347	2014 RP_{79}	—	September 2, 2014	Haleakala	Pan-STARRS 1	·	1.5 km	MPC · JPL
801348	2014 RV_{79}	—	September 15, 2014	Mount Lemmon	Mount Lemmon Survey	HNS	670 m	MPC · JPL
801349	2014 RU_{82}	—	September 2, 2014	Haleakala	Pan-STARRS 1	·	1.4 km	MPC · JPL
801350	2014 RA_{83}	—	September 15, 2014	Mount Lemmon	Mount Lemmon Survey	·	1.0 km	MPC · JPL
801351	2014 RK_{83}	—	September 2, 2014	Catalina	CSS	·	940 m	MPC · JPL
801352	2014 RB_{84}	—	September 14, 2014	Mount Lemmon	Mount Lemmon Survey	·	1.2 km	MPC · JPL
801353	2014 RW_{89}	—	September 1, 2014	Mount Lemmon	Mount Lemmon Survey	·	910 m	MPC · JPL
801354	2014 RD_{90}	—	November 28, 2010	Mount Lemmon	Mount Lemmon Survey	·	1.4 km	MPC · JPL
801355	2014 RB_{94}	—	September 1, 2014	Haleakala	Pan-STARRS 1	MAR	780 m	MPC · JPL
801356	2014 RK_{94}	—	September 4, 2014	Haleakala	Pan-STARRS 1	·	1.8 km	MPC · JPL
801357	2014 RS_{95}	—	September 2, 2014	Haleakala	Pan-STARRS 1	·	1.5 km	MPC · JPL
801358	2014 RW_{96}	—	September 2, 2014	Haleakala	Pan-STARRS 1	·	910 m	MPC · JPL
801359	2014 SN_{16}	—	August 20, 2014	Haleakala	Pan-STARRS 1	KOR	1.1 km	MPC · JPL
801360	2014 SA_{18}	—	September 17, 2014	Haleakala	Pan-STARRS 1	VER	1.8 km	MPC · JPL
801361	2014 SP_{19}	—	August 31, 2014	Haleakala	Pan-STARRS 1	·	1.8 km	MPC · JPL
801362	2014 ST_{19}	—	September 17, 2014	Haleakala	Pan-STARRS 1	·	970 m	MPC · JPL
801363	2014 SL_{25}	—	July 30, 2014	Haleakala	Pan-STARRS 1	·	1.2 km	MPC · JPL
801364	2014 SC_{32}	—	December 4, 2010	Mount Lemmon	Mount Lemmon Survey	·	1.2 km	MPC · JPL
801365	2014 SZ_{33}	—	October 9, 2010	Mount Lemmon	Mount Lemmon Survey	·	860 m	MPC · JPL
801366	2014 SZ_{35}	—	August 27, 2014	Haleakala	Pan-STARRS 1	·	2.3 km	MPC · JPL
801367	2014 SO_{39}	—	December 13, 2010	Mauna Kea	M. Micheli, L. Wells	·	2.1 km	MPC · JPL
801368	2014 SC_{48}	—	August 28, 2014	Haleakala	Pan-STARRS 1	·	1.8 km	MPC · JPL
801369	2014 SL_{54}	—	September 17, 2014	Haleakala	Pan-STARRS 1	·	1.5 km	MPC · JPL
801370	2014 SL_{56}	—	November 27, 2010	Mount Lemmon	Mount Lemmon Survey	AGN	820 m	MPC · JPL
801371 Pocora	2014 SO_{62}	Pocora	September 18, 2014	Roque de los Muchachos	EURONEAR	·	1.2 km	MPC · JPL
801372	2014 SZ_{62}	—	July 29, 2014	Haleakala	Pan-STARRS 1	MAR	620 m	MPC · JPL
801373	2014 SX_{86}	—	September 18, 2014	Haleakala	Pan-STARRS 1	·	2.3 km	MPC · JPL
801374	2014 SF_{88}	—	November 8, 2010	Mount Lemmon	Mount Lemmon Survey	ADE	1.1 km	MPC · JPL
801375	2014 SR_{94}	—	October 30, 2005	Kitt Peak	Spacewatch	HOF	1.6 km	MPC · JPL
801376	2014 SC_{96}	—	September 18, 2014	Haleakala	Pan-STARRS 1	·	760 m	MPC · JPL
801377	2014 SC_{100}	—	September 18, 2014	Haleakala	Pan-STARRS 1	·	1.1 km	MPC · JPL
801378	2014 SF_{101}	—	September 18, 2014	Haleakala	Pan-STARRS 1	·	1.4 km	MPC · JPL
801379	2014 SQ_{104}	—	March 15, 2013	Kitt Peak	Spacewatch	·	700 m	MPC · JPL
801380	2014 SH_{109}	—	September 18, 2014	Haleakala	Pan-STARRS 1	·	820 m	MPC · JPL
801381	2014 SQ_{115}	—	September 18, 2014	Haleakala	Pan-STARRS 1	·	1.3 km	MPC · JPL
801382	2014 SZ_{115}	—	September 18, 2014	Haleakala	Pan-STARRS 1	·	950 m	MPC · JPL
801383	2014 SW_{122}	—	September 18, 2014	Haleakala	Pan-STARRS 1	HNS	680 m	MPC · JPL
801384	2014 SD_{123}	—	March 31, 2012	Mount Lemmon	Mount Lemmon Survey	·	1.2 km	MPC · JPL
801385	2014 SO_{131}	—	September 18, 2014	Haleakala	Pan-STARRS 1	·	1.9 km	MPC · JPL
801386	2014 SG_{133}	—	April 27, 2012	Haleakala	Pan-STARRS 1	EOS	1.2 km	MPC · JPL
801387	2014 SW_{137}	—	January 29, 2011	Mount Lemmon	Mount Lemmon Survey	·	1.5 km	MPC · JPL
801388	2014 SQ_{170}	—	September 20, 2014	Haleakala	Pan-STARRS 1	·	1.9 km	MPC · JPL
801389	2014 SL_{171}	—	August 29, 2014	Haleakala	Pan-STARRS 1	·	1.3 km	MPC · JPL
801390	2014 SF_{172}	—	June 7, 2013	Haleakala	Pan-STARRS 1	KOR	950 m	MPC · JPL
801391	2014 SC_{173}	—	August 28, 2014	Kitt Peak	Spacewatch	·	800 m	MPC · JPL
801392	2014 SH_{174}	—	August 24, 2014	Kitt Peak	Spacewatch	·	1.2 km	MPC · JPL
801393	2014 SR_{180}	—	September 20, 2014	Haleakala	Pan-STARRS 1	HOF	1.7 km	MPC · JPL
801394	2014 SJ_{182}	—	November 16, 2006	Kitt Peak	Spacewatch	·	780 m	MPC · JPL
801395	2014 SB_{185}	—	March 19, 2013	Haleakala	Pan-STARRS 1	·	870 m	MPC · JPL
801396	2014 SK_{186}	—	August 27, 2014	Haleakala	Pan-STARRS 1	·	730 m	MPC · JPL
801397	2014 SS_{189}	—	September 20, 2014	Haleakala	Pan-STARRS 1	HOF	1.6 km	MPC · JPL
801398	2014 SH_{196}	—	August 25, 2014	Haleakala	Pan-STARRS 1	HNS	670 m	MPC · JPL
801399	2014 SU_{198}	—	July 31, 2014	Haleakala	Pan-STARRS 1	·	1.5 km	MPC · JPL
801400	2014 SE_{199}	—	August 20, 2014	Haleakala	Pan-STARRS 1	·	1.3 km	MPC · JPL

== 801401–801500 ==
back to top

Designation			Discovery			Properties		Ref
Permanent	Provisional	Named after	Date	Site	Discoverer(s)	Category	Diam.	Ref
801401	2014 SF_{202}	—	August 27, 2014	Haleakala	Pan-STARRS 1	·	1.2 km	MPC · JPL
801402	2014 SY_{213}	—	September 20, 2014	Haleakala	Pan-STARRS 1	MAR	830 m	MPC · JPL
801403	2014 SP_{215}	—	September 20, 2014	Haleakala	Pan-STARRS 1	JUN	770 m	MPC · JPL
801404	2014 SS_{219}	—	September 12, 2009	Kitt Peak	Spacewatch	GAL	930 m	MPC · JPL
801405	2014 ST_{225}	—	September 25, 2006	Kitt Peak	Spacewatch	·	730 m	MPC · JPL
801406	2014 SF_{226}	—	November 1, 2010	Mount Lemmon	Mount Lemmon Survey	·	860 m	MPC · JPL
801407	2014 SA_{230}	—	September 19, 2014	Haleakala	Pan-STARRS 1	·	1.2 km	MPC · JPL
801408	2014 SD_{231}	—	September 19, 2014	Haleakala	Pan-STARRS 1	THM	1.7 km	MPC · JPL
801409	2014 SO_{239}	—	September 9, 2010	Kitt Peak	Spacewatch	JUN	570 m	MPC · JPL
801410	2014 SY_{239}	—	September 22, 2014	Haleakala	Pan-STARRS 1	EUN	870 m	MPC · JPL
801411	2014 SM_{246}	—	July 31, 2014	Haleakala	Pan-STARRS 1	·	780 m	MPC · JPL
801412	2014 SL_{250}	—	August 28, 2014	Haleakala	Pan-STARRS 1	·	1.1 km	MPC · JPL
801413	2014 SX_{253}	—	September 23, 2014	Mount Lemmon	Mount Lemmon Survey	critical	1.3 km	MPC · JPL
801414	2014 SJ_{259}	—	September 24, 2014	Mount Lemmon	Mount Lemmon Survey	·	1.2 km	MPC · JPL
801415	2014 SM_{259}	—	October 14, 2010	Mount Lemmon	Mount Lemmon Survey	·	1.0 km	MPC · JPL
801416	2014 SQ_{263}	—	March 24, 2012	Mount Lemmon	Mount Lemmon Survey	BAR	1.1 km	MPC · JPL
801417	2014 SM_{264}	—	September 29, 2003	Kitt Peak	Spacewatch	THM	1.6 km	MPC · JPL
801418	2014 SQ_{267}	—	August 27, 2014	Haleakala	Pan-STARRS 1	·	980 m	MPC · JPL
801419	2014 SK_{270}	—	September 2, 2014	Haleakala	Pan-STARRS 1	·	2.1 km	MPC · JPL
801420	2014 SA_{272}	—	September 18, 2014	Haleakala	Pan-STARRS 1	·	700 m	MPC · JPL
801421	2014 SD_{273}	—	September 20, 2014	Haleakala	Pan-STARRS 1	·	700 m	MPC · JPL
801422	2014 SE_{273}	—	September 20, 2014	Haleakala	Pan-STARRS 1	·	1.8 km	MPC · JPL
801423	2014 SB_{274}	—	September 15, 2014	Mount Lemmon	Mount Lemmon Survey	·	780 m	MPC · JPL
801424	2014 SL_{278}	—	September 22, 2014	Kitt Peak	Spacewatch	BRA	1.2 km	MPC · JPL
801425	2014 SG_{281}	—	September 22, 2014	Kitt Peak	Spacewatch	·	1.3 km	MPC · JPL
801426	2014 ST_{288}	—	September 11, 2014	Haleakala	Pan-STARRS 1	·	3.3 km	MPC · JPL
801427	2014 SK_{292}	—	October 9, 2004	Kitt Peak	Spacewatch	·	1.5 km	MPC · JPL
801428	2014 SD_{294}	—	September 25, 2014	Mount Lemmon	Mount Lemmon Survey	MAR	730 m	MPC · JPL
801429	2014 SL_{294}	—	December 10, 2010	Mount Lemmon	Mount Lemmon Survey	ELF	2.9 km	MPC · JPL
801430	2014 SO_{294}	—	September 25, 2014	Mount Lemmon	Mount Lemmon Survey	·	930 m	MPC · JPL
801431	2014 SN_{295}	—	February 2, 2008	Mount Lemmon	Mount Lemmon Survey	·	1.2 km	MPC · JPL
801432	2014 ST_{317}	—	September 13, 2005	Kitt Peak	Spacewatch	·	1.2 km	MPC · JPL
801433	2014 SW_{320}	—	September 2, 2014	Haleakala	Pan-STARRS 1	EUN	910 m	MPC · JPL
801434	2014 SC_{322}	—	September 30, 2014	Mount Lemmon	Mount Lemmon Survey	·	950 m	MPC · JPL
801435	2014 ST_{327}	—	September 2, 2014	Haleakala	Pan-STARRS 1	EUN	970 m	MPC · JPL
801436	2014 SW_{329}	—	October 17, 2003	Kitt Peak	Spacewatch	·	2.3 km	MPC · JPL
801437	2014 SD_{331}	—	September 14, 2014	Mount Lemmon	Mount Lemmon Survey	EUN	990 m	MPC · JPL
801438	2014 SJ_{331}	—	September 19, 2014	Haleakala	Pan-STARRS 1	·	1.3 km	MPC · JPL
801439	2014 SK_{334}	—	June 15, 2009	Mount Lemmon	Mount Lemmon Survey	AEO	770 m	MPC · JPL
801440	2014 SN_{334}	—	September 19, 2014	Haleakala	Pan-STARRS 1	·	1.1 km	MPC · JPL
801441	2014 SN_{341}	—	March 24, 2012	Mount Lemmon	Mount Lemmon Survey	HNS	790 m	MPC · JPL
801442	2014 SS_{341}	—	September 19, 2014	Haleakala	Pan-STARRS 1	·	1.3 km	MPC · JPL
801443	2014 SZ_{352}	—	September 25, 2014	Kitt Peak	Spacewatch	MRX	760 m	MPC · JPL
801444	2014 SY_{353}	—	January 27, 2007	Mount Lemmon	Mount Lemmon Survey	·	1.1 km	MPC · JPL
801445	2014 SN_{355}	—	September 19, 2014	Haleakala	Pan-STARRS 1	·	2.0 km	MPC · JPL
801446	2014 SP_{355}	—	September 19, 2014	Haleakala	Pan-STARRS 1	EOS	1.4 km	MPC · JPL
801447	2014 SC_{358}	—	September 19, 2014	Haleakala	Pan-STARRS 1	·	990 m	MPC · JPL
801448	2014 SN_{358}	—	September 19, 2014	Haleakala	Pan-STARRS 1	·	970 m	MPC · JPL
801449	2014 SO_{358}	—	September 19, 2014	Haleakala	Pan-STARRS 1	EUN	810 m	MPC · JPL
801450	2014 SQ_{358}	—	September 19, 2014	Haleakala	Pan-STARRS 1	KOR	1.1 km	MPC · JPL
801451	2014 SO_{362}	—	September 25, 2014	Kitt Peak	Spacewatch	·	1.9 km	MPC · JPL
801452	2014 SU_{362}	—	September 22, 2014	Kitt Peak	Spacewatch	·	1.9 km	MPC · JPL
801453	2014 SV_{364}	—	September 17, 2014	Haleakala	Pan-STARRS 1	·	1.8 km	MPC · JPL
801454	2014 SD_{368}	—	September 20, 2014	Haleakala	Pan-STARRS 1	·	1.4 km	MPC · JPL
801455	2014 SV_{377}	—	September 18, 2014	Haleakala	Pan-STARRS 1	MAR	770 m	MPC · JPL
801456	2014 SY_{377}	—	September 29, 2014	Haleakala	Pan-STARRS 1	·	1.1 km	MPC · JPL
801457	2014 ST_{379}	—	September 19, 2014	Haleakala	Pan-STARRS 1	·	1.6 km	MPC · JPL
801458	2014 SE_{381}	—	September 18, 2014	Haleakala	Pan-STARRS 1	EOS	1.1 km	MPC · JPL
801459	2014 SH_{381}	—	September 29, 2014	Haleakala	Pan-STARRS 1	·	1.6 km	MPC · JPL
801460	2014 SR_{382}	—	September 30, 2014	Mount Lemmon	Mount Lemmon Survey	·	1.1 km	MPC · JPL
801461	2014 SM_{384}	—	October 2, 2008	Kitt Peak	Spacewatch	·	2.9 km	MPC · JPL
801462	2014 SY_{384}	—	September 19, 2014	Haleakala	Pan-STARRS 1	·	1.2 km	MPC · JPL
801463	2014 SH_{386}	—	September 19, 2014	Haleakala	Pan-STARRS 1	·	2.3 km	MPC · JPL
801464	2014 SL_{387}	—	September 20, 2014	Haleakala	Pan-STARRS 1	·	1.3 km	MPC · JPL
801465	2014 SP_{388}	—	September 19, 2014	Haleakala	Pan-STARRS 1	·	1.2 km	MPC · JPL
801466	2014 SJ_{389}	—	September 19, 2014	Haleakala	Pan-STARRS 1	THM	1.4 km	MPC · JPL
801467	2014 SC_{391}	—	September 23, 2014	Mount Lemmon	Mount Lemmon Survey	·	2.3 km	MPC · JPL
801468	2014 ST_{393}	—	September 20, 2014	Haleakala	Pan-STARRS 1	·	1.6 km	MPC · JPL
801469	2014 SZ_{395}	—	September 16, 2014	Haleakala	Pan-STARRS 1	·	900 m	MPC · JPL
801470	2014 SO_{396}	—	September 23, 2014	Haleakala	Pan-STARRS 1	MAR	660 m	MPC · JPL
801471	2014 SY_{396}	—	September 17, 2014	Haleakala	Pan-STARRS 1	·	830 m	MPC · JPL
801472	2014 SZ_{396}	—	September 23, 2014	Mount Lemmon	Mount Lemmon Survey	HNS	720 m	MPC · JPL
801473	2014 SK_{399}	—	September 19, 2014	Haleakala	Pan-STARRS 1	·	1.1 km	MPC · JPL
801474	2014 SL_{399}	—	September 29, 2014	Haleakala	Pan-STARRS 1	·	630 m	MPC · JPL
801475	2014 SM_{399}	—	September 16, 2014	Haleakala	Pan-STARRS 1	EUN	790 m	MPC · JPL
801476	2014 SG_{408}	—	September 30, 2014	Mount Lemmon	Mount Lemmon Survey	·	2.9 km	MPC · JPL
801477	2014 SH_{408}	—	September 20, 2014	Haleakala	Pan-STARRS 1	HNS	720 m	MPC · JPL
801478	2014 SK_{410}	—	September 18, 2014	Haleakala	Pan-STARRS 1	·	1.1 km	MPC · JPL
801479	2014 SJ_{412}	—	September 20, 2014	Haleakala	Pan-STARRS 1	·	1.4 km	MPC · JPL
801480	2014 SK_{412}	—	September 20, 2014	Haleakala	Pan-STARRS 1	·	1.6 km	MPC · JPL
801481	2014 SU_{413}	—	September 19, 2014	Haleakala	Pan-STARRS 1	·	990 m	MPC · JPL
801482	2014 SX_{417}	—	September 17, 2014	Haleakala	Pan-STARRS 1	·	1.3 km	MPC · JPL
801483	2014 SL_{418}	—	September 20, 2014	Haleakala	Pan-STARRS 1	·	1.1 km	MPC · JPL
801484	2014 SX_{419}	—	September 19, 2014	Haleakala	Pan-STARRS 1	·	1.2 km	MPC · JPL
801485	2014 SE_{421}	—	September 22, 2014	Kitt Peak	Spacewatch	·	1.3 km	MPC · JPL
801486	2014 SO_{428}	—	September 19, 2014	Haleakala	Pan-STARRS 1	·	1.3 km	MPC · JPL
801487	2014 SZ_{432}	—	September 29, 2014	Haleakala	Pan-STARRS 1	·	980 m	MPC · JPL
801488	2014 TV_{7}	—	June 30, 2014	Haleakala	Pan-STARRS 1	·	2.0 km	MPC · JPL
801489	2014 TE_{11}	—	October 1, 2014	Haleakala	Pan-STARRS 1	·	1.3 km	MPC · JPL
801490	2014 TP_{23}	—	October 1, 2014	Mount Lemmon	Mount Lemmon Survey	·	1.2 km	MPC · JPL
801491	2014 TX_{23}	—	August 24, 2003	Palomar Mountain	NEAT	·	2.1 km	MPC · JPL
801492	2014 TG_{31}	—	November 6, 2010	Mount Lemmon	Mount Lemmon Survey	·	790 m	MPC · JPL
801493	2014 TE_{34}	—	October 7, 2014	Haleakala	Pan-STARRS 1	·	1.1 km	MPC · JPL
801494	2014 TW_{35}	—	October 14, 2014	Mount Lemmon	Mount Lemmon Survey	·	1.1 km	MPC · JPL
801495	2014 TB_{46}	—	September 2, 2014	Haleakala	Pan-STARRS 1	·	1.5 km	MPC · JPL
801496	2014 TY_{56}	—	October 15, 2014	Mount Lemmon	Mount Lemmon Survey	·	1.0 km	MPC · JPL
801497	2014 TH_{59}	—	October 13, 2014	Kitt Peak	Spacewatch	·	1.8 km	MPC · JPL
801498	2014 TA_{61}	—	October 13, 2014	Mount Lemmon	Mount Lemmon Survey	·	1.1 km	MPC · JPL
801499	2014 TD_{73}	—	October 15, 2014	Kitt Peak	Spacewatch	·	1.0 km	MPC · JPL
801500	2014 TE_{77}	—	October 14, 2014	Mount Lemmon	Mount Lemmon Survey	·	1.1 km	MPC · JPL

== 801501–801600 ==
back to top

Designation			Discovery			Properties		Ref
Permanent	Provisional	Named after	Date	Site	Discoverer(s)	Category	Diam.	Ref
801501	2014 TQ_{77}	—	September 7, 2008	Mount Lemmon	Mount Lemmon Survey	·	2.1 km	MPC · JPL
801502	2014 TL_{78}	—	November 11, 2010	Mount Lemmon	Mount Lemmon Survey	·	900 m	MPC · JPL
801503	2014 TX_{78}	—	October 1, 2014	Haleakala	Pan-STARRS 1	·	2.0 km	MPC · JPL
801504	2014 TX_{85}	—	October 2, 2014	Haleakala	Pan-STARRS 1	other TNO	152 km	MPC · JPL
801505	2014 TV_{86}	—	October 1, 2014	Haleakala	Pan-STARRS 1	·	1.2 km	MPC · JPL
801506	2014 TW_{88}	—	October 1, 2014	Haleakala	Pan-STARRS 1	VER	2.0 km	MPC · JPL
801507	2014 TF_{89}	—	July 29, 2008	Kitt Peak	Spacewatch	THM	1.6 km	MPC · JPL
801508	2014 TR_{91}	—	October 1, 2014	Haleakala	Pan-STARRS 1	·	1.3 km	MPC · JPL
801509	2014 TG_{93}	—	January 16, 2011	Mount Lemmon	Mount Lemmon Survey	·	1.3 km	MPC · JPL
801510	2014 TV_{103}	—	October 3, 2014	Kitt Peak	Spacewatch	·	930 m	MPC · JPL
801511	2014 TG_{104}	—	October 1, 2014	Haleakala	Pan-STARRS 1	EOS	1.6 km	MPC · JPL
801512	2014 TL_{104}	—	October 3, 2014	Mount Lemmon	Mount Lemmon Survey	HNS	840 m	MPC · JPL
801513	2014 TR_{109}	—	October 3, 2014	Mount Lemmon	Mount Lemmon Survey	VER	2.1 km	MPC · JPL
801514	2014 TS_{109}	—	October 2, 2014	Kitt Peak	Spacewatch	EOS	1.3 km	MPC · JPL
801515	2014 TD_{110}	—	October 1, 2014	Haleakala	Pan-STARRS 1	·	2.3 km	MPC · JPL
801516	2014 TM_{110}	—	October 5, 2014	Haleakala	Pan-STARRS 1	T_{j} (2.99) · EUP	2.1 km	MPC · JPL
801517	2014 TN_{112}	—	October 4, 2014	Kitt Peak	Spacewatch	·	810 m	MPC · JPL
801518	2014 TY_{112}	—	October 1, 2014	Haleakala	Pan-STARRS 1	EUN	780 m	MPC · JPL
801519	2014 TB_{118}	—	February 3, 2008	Mount Lemmon	Mount Lemmon Survey	T_{j} (2.99) · 3:2	3.8 km	MPC · JPL
801520	2014 TY_{118}	—	October 14, 2014	Mount Lemmon	Mount Lemmon Survey	·	2.0 km	MPC · JPL
801521	2014 TK_{121}	—	October 14, 2014	Mount Lemmon	Mount Lemmon Survey	EOS	1.3 km	MPC · JPL
801522	2014 TT_{122}	—	October 1, 2014	Haleakala	Pan-STARRS 1	·	1.5 km	MPC · JPL
801523	2014 TM_{123}	—	October 13, 2014	Mount Lemmon	Mount Lemmon Survey	HNS	760 m	MPC · JPL
801524	2014 TS_{123}	—	October 13, 2014	Mount Lemmon	Mount Lemmon Survey	·	1.2 km	MPC · JPL
801525	2014 UV	—	October 16, 2014	Mount Lemmon	Mount Lemmon Survey	AMO	270 m	MPC · JPL
801526	2014 UZ_{6}	—	October 19, 2014	Nogales	M. Schwartz, P. R. Holvorcem	·	1.8 km	MPC · JPL
801527	2014 UQ_{9}	—	October 30, 2005	Mount Lemmon	Mount Lemmon Survey	·	1.3 km	MPC · JPL
801528	2014 UR_{22}	—	October 18, 2014	Mount Lemmon	Mount Lemmon Survey	·	1.1 km	MPC · JPL
801529	2014 UK_{26}	—	October 1, 2014	Kitt Peak	Spacewatch	·	1.2 km	MPC · JPL
801530	2014 UC_{30}	—	October 21, 2014	Kitt Peak	Spacewatch	EOS	1.2 km	MPC · JPL
801531	2014 UX_{30}	—	October 5, 2014	Mount Lemmon	Mount Lemmon Survey	·	1.1 km	MPC · JPL
801532	2014 UU_{31}	—	October 21, 2014	Mount Lemmon	Mount Lemmon Survey	MAR	740 m	MPC · JPL
801533	2014 UE_{35}	—	August 31, 2014	Haleakala	Pan-STARRS 1	EUN	870 m	MPC · JPL
801534	2014 US_{35}	—	October 18, 2014	Mount Lemmon	Mount Lemmon Survey	·	1.1 km	MPC · JPL
801535	2014 UA_{39}	—	October 18, 2014	Mount Lemmon	Mount Lemmon Survey	·	1.9 km	MPC · JPL
801536	2014 UV_{48}	—	October 21, 2014	Mount Lemmon	Mount Lemmon Survey	(5)	910 m	MPC · JPL
801537	2014 UT_{49}	—	October 21, 2014	Kitt Peak	Spacewatch	·	1.4 km	MPC · JPL
801538	2014 UD_{62}	—	October 19, 2014	Kitt Peak	Spacewatch	·	1.4 km	MPC · JPL
801539	2014 UB_{63}	—	September 19, 2014	Haleakala	Pan-STARRS 1	·	2.2 km	MPC · JPL
801540	2014 UB_{70}	—	October 13, 2014	Mount Lemmon	Mount Lemmon Survey	·	2.0 km	MPC · JPL
801541	2014 UE_{70}	—	September 28, 2009	Kitt Peak	Spacewatch	KOR	910 m	MPC · JPL
801542	2014 UJ_{72}	—	October 13, 2014	Mount Lemmon	Mount Lemmon Survey	HYG	2.0 km	MPC · JPL
801543	2014 UC_{80}	—	October 1, 2014	Kitt Peak	Spacewatch	KOR	980 m	MPC · JPL
801544	2014 UW_{82}	—	October 21, 2014	Mount Lemmon	Mount Lemmon Survey	VER	2.0 km	MPC · JPL
801545	2014 UV_{91}	—	September 11, 2010	Mount Lemmon	Mount Lemmon Survey	·	1.0 km	MPC · JPL
801546	2014 UG_{95}	—	October 3, 2014	Mount Lemmon	Mount Lemmon Survey	·	840 m	MPC · JPL
801547	2014 UY_{118}	—	October 22, 2014	Kitt Peak	Spacewatch	·	990 m	MPC · JPL
801548	2014 UO_{120}	—	October 22, 2014	Kitt Peak	Spacewatch	·	2.1 km	MPC · JPL
801549	2014 UR_{124}	—	October 3, 2014	Mount Lemmon	Mount Lemmon Survey	HNS	1.0 km	MPC · JPL
801550	2014 UB_{127}	—	October 23, 2014	Kitt Peak	Spacewatch	·	1.2 km	MPC · JPL
801551	2014 UQ_{127}	—	April 12, 2013	Haleakala	Pan-STARRS 1	·	890 m	MPC · JPL
801552	2014 UA_{133}	—	October 24, 2014	Kitt Peak	Spacewatch	·	1.0 km	MPC · JPL
801553	2014 UP_{133}	—	October 24, 2014	Kitt Peak	Spacewatch	·	1.2 km	MPC · JPL
801554	2014 UX_{149}	—	October 14, 2014	Kitt Peak	Spacewatch	·	1.4 km	MPC · JPL
801555	2014 UP_{154}	—	October 2, 2014	Haleakala	Pan-STARRS 1	MAR	670 m	MPC · JPL
801556	2014 UX_{154}	—	November 4, 2004	Kitt Peak	Spacewatch	·	440 m	MPC · JPL
801557	2014 UL_{155}	—	October 4, 1997	Kitt Peak	Spacewatch	·	970 m	MPC · JPL
801558	2014 UY_{159}	—	August 31, 2014	Haleakala	Pan-STARRS 1	·	820 m	MPC · JPL
801559	2014 UY_{164}	—	July 13, 2013	Mount Lemmon	Mount Lemmon Survey	·	2.7 km	MPC · JPL
801560	2014 UL_{166}	—	September 5, 2000	Sacramento Peak	SDSS	·	1.3 km	MPC · JPL
801561	2014 UT_{167}	—	October 26, 2014	Mount Lemmon	Mount Lemmon Survey	·	1.1 km	MPC · JPL
801562	2014 UN_{168}	—	October 26, 2014	Mount Lemmon	Mount Lemmon Survey	·	990 m	MPC · JPL
801563	2014 UY_{168}	—	October 26, 2014	Mount Lemmon	Mount Lemmon Survey	·	1.1 km	MPC · JPL
801564	2014 UF_{177}	—	February 10, 2011	Mount Lemmon	Mount Lemmon Survey	·	1.1 km	MPC · JPL
801565	2014 UT_{177}	—	October 5, 2014	Kitt Peak	Spacewatch	·	1.0 km	MPC · JPL
801566	2014 UQ_{182}	—	October 22, 2014	Kitt Peak	Spacewatch	·	1.2 km	MPC · JPL
801567	2014 UO_{190}	—	October 13, 2014	Kitt Peak	Spacewatch	·	1.4 km	MPC · JPL
801568	2014 UD_{203}	—	October 29, 2014	Catalina	CSS	·	1.5 km	MPC · JPL
801569	2014 UQ_{203}	—	October 14, 2014	Kitt Peak	Spacewatch	·	1.6 km	MPC · JPL
801570	2014 US_{204}	—	September 4, 2014	Haleakala	Pan-STARRS 1	·	2.8 km	MPC · JPL
801571	2014 UK_{205}	—	October 31, 2014	Mount Lemmon	Mount Lemmon Survey	·	2.4 km	MPC · JPL
801572	2014 UT_{205}	—	October 31, 2014	Mount Lemmon	Mount Lemmon Survey	EOS	1.2 km	MPC · JPL
801573	2014 UU_{208}	—	November 1, 2014	Mount Lemmon	Mount Lemmon Survey	·	2.5 km	MPC · JPL
801574	2014 UY_{209}	—	October 30, 2014	Calar Alto	S. Mottola, S. Hellmich	·	1.3 km	MPC · JPL
801575	2014 UC_{215}	—	August 23, 2014	Haleakala	Pan-STARRS 1	·	2.6 km	MPC · JPL
801576	2014 UG_{227}	—	October 29, 2014	Haleakala	Pan-STARRS 1	·	1.0 km	MPC · JPL
801577	2014 UY_{227}	—	October 20, 2014	Kitt Peak	Spacewatch	KOR	1.0 km	MPC · JPL
801578	2014 UH_{230}	—	October 26, 2014	Haleakala	Pan-STARRS 1	EUN	740 m	MPC · JPL
801579	2014 US_{234}	—	October 22, 2014	Mount Lemmon	Mount Lemmon Survey	·	1.2 km	MPC · JPL
801580	2014 UX_{236}	—	October 26, 2014	Mount Lemmon	Mount Lemmon Survey	·	1.3 km	MPC · JPL
801581	2014 UZ_{238}	—	October 28, 2014	Haleakala	Pan-STARRS 1	·	1.1 km	MPC · JPL
801582	2014 UK_{239}	—	October 29, 2014	Haleakala	Pan-STARRS 1	·	1.1 km	MPC · JPL
801583	2014 UH_{242}	—	October 25, 2014	Haleakala	Pan-STARRS 1	·	1.7 km	MPC · JPL
801584	2014 UO_{243}	—	October 24, 2014	Kitt Peak	Spacewatch	·	1.2 km	MPC · JPL
801585	2014 UO_{245}	—	October 29, 2014	Haleakala	Pan-STARRS 1	·	1.2 km	MPC · JPL
801586	2014 UV_{245}	—	October 29, 2014	Haleakala	Pan-STARRS 1	·	1.2 km	MPC · JPL
801587	2014 UG_{246}	—	October 30, 2014	Mount Lemmon	Mount Lemmon Survey	LUT	2.8 km	MPC · JPL
801588	2014 US_{246}	—	October 25, 2014	Mount Lemmon	Mount Lemmon Survey	·	1.9 km	MPC · JPL
801589	2014 UV_{246}	—	October 28, 2014	Haleakala	Pan-STARRS 1	·	1.0 km	MPC · JPL
801590	2014 UA_{247}	—	October 24, 2014	Mount Lemmon	Mount Lemmon Survey	·	1.4 km	MPC · JPL
801591	2014 UU_{247}	—	October 31, 2014	Mount Lemmon	Mount Lemmon Survey	·	1.4 km	MPC · JPL
801592	2014 UD_{249}	—	October 26, 2014	Mount Lemmon	Mount Lemmon Survey	MAR	770 m	MPC · JPL
801593	2014 UB_{250}	—	October 28, 2014	Haleakala	Pan-STARRS 1	·	1.2 km	MPC · JPL
801594	2014 UE_{251}	—	October 26, 2014	Mount Lemmon	Mount Lemmon Survey	L5	7.0 km	MPC · JPL
801595	2014 UG_{251}	—	October 26, 2014	Mount Lemmon	Mount Lemmon Survey	·	880 m	MPC · JPL
801596	2014 UJ_{252}	—	October 30, 2014	Haleakala	Pan-STARRS 1	·	1.6 km	MPC · JPL
801597	2014 UV_{253}	—	October 25, 2014	Haleakala	Pan-STARRS 1	·	1.0 km	MPC · JPL
801598	2014 UV_{255}	—	October 28, 2014	Mount Lemmon	Mount Lemmon Survey	·	1.4 km	MPC · JPL
801599	2014 UM_{256}	—	October 28, 2014	Mount Lemmon	Mount Lemmon Survey	·	2.1 km	MPC · JPL
801600	2014 UD_{258}	—	October 28, 2014	Kitt Peak	Spacewatch	·	2.0 km	MPC · JPL

== 801601–801700 ==
back to top

Designation			Discovery			Properties		Ref
Permanent	Provisional	Named after	Date	Site	Discoverer(s)	Category	Diam.	Ref
801601	2014 UE_{258}	—	October 28, 2014	Haleakala	Pan-STARRS 1	KON	1.4 km	MPC · JPL
801602	2014 UP_{259}	—	October 22, 2014	Mount Lemmon	Mount Lemmon Survey	·	1.1 km	MPC · JPL
801603	2014 UX_{259}	—	October 26, 2014	Mount Lemmon	Mount Lemmon Survey	·	1.2 km	MPC · JPL
801604	2014 UZ_{259}	—	October 28, 2014	Mount Lemmon	Mount Lemmon Survey	·	1.2 km	MPC · JPL
801605	2014 UG_{260}	—	October 28, 2014	Haleakala	Pan-STARRS 1	·	1.3 km	MPC · JPL
801606	2014 UA_{261}	—	October 28, 2014	Haleakala	Pan-STARRS 1	KOR	920 m	MPC · JPL
801607	2014 UR_{264}	—	October 25, 2014	Mount Lemmon	Mount Lemmon Survey	KOR	910 m	MPC · JPL
801608	2014 US_{265}	—	October 25, 2014	Cerro Tololo-DECam	DECam	EOS	1.1 km	MPC · JPL
801609	2014 UV_{265}	—	October 17, 2014	Mount Lemmon	Mount Lemmon Survey	·	1.3 km	MPC · JPL
801610	2014 UQ_{268}	—	October 21, 2014	Kitt Peak	Spacewatch	·	1.1 km	MPC · JPL
801611	2014 UV_{269}	—	October 28, 2014	Kitt Peak	Spacewatch	·	1.5 km	MPC · JPL
801612	2014 UB_{270}	—	October 20, 2014	Mount Lemmon	Mount Lemmon Survey	·	1.0 km	MPC · JPL
801613	2014 UH_{270}	—	October 28, 2014	Haleakala	Pan-STARRS 1	·	1.3 km	MPC · JPL
801614	2014 UJ_{270}	—	October 28, 2014	Haleakala	Pan-STARRS 1	·	860 m	MPC · JPL
801615	2014 UM_{270}	—	October 28, 2014	Mount Lemmon	Mount Lemmon Survey	·	1.2 km	MPC · JPL
801616	2014 UQ_{271}	—	October 25, 2014	Mount Lemmon	Mount Lemmon Survey	·	1.2 km	MPC · JPL
801617	2014 UR_{271}	—	October 28, 2014	Haleakala	Pan-STARRS 1	·	1.1 km	MPC · JPL
801618	2014 UB_{273}	—	October 1, 2014	Haleakala	Pan-STARRS 1	·	1.1 km	MPC · JPL
801619	2014 UC_{273}	—	October 21, 2014	Mount Lemmon	Mount Lemmon Survey	·	1.0 km	MPC · JPL
801620	2014 UU_{274}	—	October 30, 2014	Mount Lemmon	Mount Lemmon Survey	·	2.1 km	MPC · JPL
801621	2014 UE_{281}	—	October 29, 2014	Haleakala	Pan-STARRS 1	·	810 m	MPC · JPL
801622	2014 UM_{282}	—	October 26, 2014	Mount Lemmon	Mount Lemmon Survey	ELF	2.5 km	MPC · JPL
801623	2014 UN_{282}	—	October 26, 2014	Mount Lemmon	Mount Lemmon Survey	·	1.2 km	MPC · JPL
801624	2014 UP_{287}	—	October 17, 2014	Mount Lemmon	Mount Lemmon Survey	VER	2.2 km	MPC · JPL
801625	2014 UH_{288}	—	October 21, 2014	Mount Lemmon	Mount Lemmon Survey	·	1.5 km	MPC · JPL
801626	2014 VE_{13}	—	October 14, 2014	Catalina	CSS	T_{j} (2.99)	3.1 km	MPC · JPL
801627	2014 VP_{14}	—	October 14, 2014	Kitt Peak	Spacewatch	·	1.3 km	MPC · JPL
801628	2014 VM_{20}	—	October 24, 2005	Kitt Peak	Spacewatch	EUN	840 m	MPC · JPL
801629	2014 VP_{26}	—	November 12, 2014	Haleakala	Pan-STARRS 1	·	1.3 km	MPC · JPL
801630	2014 VD_{32}	—	November 14, 2014	Kitt Peak	Spacewatch	·	1.5 km	MPC · JPL
801631	2014 VW_{39}	—	November 3, 2014	Mount Lemmon	Mount Lemmon Survey	HNS	960 m	MPC · JPL
801632	2014 VR_{41}	—	November 1, 2014	Mount Lemmon	Mount Lemmon Survey	·	1.3 km	MPC · JPL
801633	2014 VT_{41}	—	November 15, 2014	Mount Lemmon	Mount Lemmon Survey	·	2.0 km	MPC · JPL
801634	2014 VH_{42}	—	November 1, 2014	Mount Lemmon	Mount Lemmon Survey	·	1 km	MPC · JPL
801635	2014 VC_{43}	—	November 15, 2014	Mount Lemmon	Mount Lemmon Survey	·	1.2 km	MPC · JPL
801636	2014 WX	—	January 30, 2011	Haleakala	Pan-STARRS 1	·	1.4 km	MPC · JPL
801637	2014 WG_{9}	—	January 27, 2007	Kitt Peak	Spacewatch	·	1.1 km	MPC · JPL
801638	2014 WD_{12}	—	October 14, 2009	Mount Lemmon	Mount Lemmon Survey	·	1.3 km	MPC · JPL
801639	2014 WU_{14}	—	October 6, 2008	Mount Lemmon	Mount Lemmon Survey	·	2.1 km	MPC · JPL
801640	2014 WT_{23}	—	August 19, 2001	Cerro Tololo	Deep Ecliptic Survey	(5)	790 m	MPC · JPL
801641	2014 WX_{24}	—	October 27, 2005	Kitt Peak	Spacewatch	·	1.1 km	MPC · JPL
801642	2014 WV_{30}	—	May 1, 2012	Mount Lemmon	Mount Lemmon Survey	EOS	1.4 km	MPC · JPL
801643	2014 WV_{33}	—	October 28, 2014	Haleakala	Pan-STARRS 1	HNS	770 m	MPC · JPL
801644	2014 WG_{35}	—	October 3, 2003	Kitt Peak	Spacewatch	·	2.1 km	MPC · JPL
801645	2014 WT_{38}	—	November 17, 2014	Haleakala	Pan-STARRS 1	·	1.3 km	MPC · JPL
801646	2014 WB_{40}	—	October 25, 2014	Haleakala	Pan-STARRS 1	·	510 m	MPC · JPL
801647	2014 WH_{40}	—	October 26, 2014	Mount Lemmon	Mount Lemmon Survey	·	1.3 km	MPC · JPL
801648	2014 WE_{41}	—	August 24, 2008	Kitt Peak	Spacewatch	VER	1.8 km	MPC · JPL
801649	2014 WZ_{42}	—	November 16, 2014	Mount Lemmon	Mount Lemmon Survey	·	1.2 km	MPC · JPL
801650	2014 WC_{45}	—	November 17, 2014	Haleakala	Pan-STARRS 1	·	1.2 km	MPC · JPL
801651	2014 WB_{49}	—	October 27, 2008	Kitt Peak	Spacewatch	·	2.2 km	MPC · JPL
801652	2014 WW_{49}	—	November 17, 2014	Haleakala	Pan-STARRS 1	·	1.3 km	MPC · JPL
801653	2014 WL_{59}	—	November 17, 2014	Haleakala	Pan-STARRS 1	·	1.1 km	MPC · JPL
801654	2014 WV_{60}	—	September 20, 2014	Haleakala	Pan-STARRS 1	·	1.7 km	MPC · JPL
801655	2014 WX_{65}	—	January 14, 2011	Kitt Peak	Spacewatch	·	1.2 km	MPC · JPL
801656	2014 WR_{71}	—	November 16, 2014	Mount Lemmon	Mount Lemmon Survey	·	1.1 km	MPC · JPL
801657	2014 WE_{72}	—	August 13, 2013	Kitt Peak	Spacewatch	3:2	3.8 km	MPC · JPL
801658	2014 WK_{75}	—	November 17, 2014	Mount Lemmon	Mount Lemmon Survey	·	670 m	MPC · JPL
801659	2014 WO_{79}	—	November 17, 2014	Mount Lemmon	Mount Lemmon Survey	·	1.1 km	MPC · JPL
801660	2014 WW_{80}	—	October 28, 2014	Haleakala	Pan-STARRS 1	·	990 m	MPC · JPL
801661	2014 WY_{80}	—	November 17, 2014	Haleakala	Pan-STARRS 1	·	1.3 km	MPC · JPL
801662	2014 WD_{81}	—	November 17, 2014	Mount Lemmon	Mount Lemmon Survey	·	1.6 km	MPC · JPL
801663	2014 WN_{81}	—	September 20, 2014	Haleakala	Pan-STARRS 1	ADE	1.6 km	MPC · JPL
801664	2014 WL_{82}	—	November 17, 2014	Mount Lemmon	Mount Lemmon Survey	·	900 m	MPC · JPL
801665	2014 WZ_{83}	—	October 7, 2005	Kitt Peak	Spacewatch	·	970 m	MPC · JPL
801666	2014 WZ_{88}	—	November 17, 2014	Mount Lemmon	Mount Lemmon Survey	·	1.3 km	MPC · JPL
801667	2014 WN_{89}	—	January 3, 2011	Mount Lemmon	Mount Lemmon Survey	·	1.2 km	MPC · JPL
801668	2014 WM_{91}	—	November 17, 2014	Mount Lemmon	Mount Lemmon Survey	·	1.1 km	MPC · JPL
801669	2014 WP_{92}	—	November 17, 2014	Mount Lemmon	Mount Lemmon Survey	(5)	900 m	MPC · JPL
801670	2014 WT_{94}	—	November 17, 2014	Mount Lemmon	Mount Lemmon Survey	DOR	1.3 km	MPC · JPL
801671	2014 WS_{95}	—	November 17, 2014	Mount Lemmon	Mount Lemmon Survey	·	1.2 km	MPC · JPL
801672	2014 WC_{96}	—	November 17, 2014	Mount Lemmon	Mount Lemmon Survey	EOS	1.3 km	MPC · JPL
801673	2014 WP_{96}	—	September 4, 2008	Kitt Peak	Spacewatch	·	1.8 km	MPC · JPL
801674	2014 WU_{96}	—	November 17, 2014	Mount Lemmon	Mount Lemmon Survey	·	1.1 km	MPC · JPL
801675	2014 WQ_{97}	—	October 25, 2014	Haleakala	Pan-STARRS 1	EOS	1.5 km	MPC · JPL
801676	2014 WZ_{98}	—	September 27, 2009	Mount Lemmon	Mount Lemmon Survey	·	1.4 km	MPC · JPL
801677	2014 WJ_{99}	—	October 23, 2014	Kitt Peak	Spacewatch	·	450 m	MPC · JPL
801678	2014 WG_{103}	—	November 17, 2014	Haleakala	Pan-STARRS 1	AGN	810 m	MPC · JPL
801679	2014 WX_{103}	—	November 17, 2014	Haleakala	Pan-STARRS 1	·	1.0 km	MPC · JPL
801680	2014 WH_{105}	—	October 16, 2014	Kitt Peak	Spacewatch	·	970 m	MPC · JPL
801681	2014 WF_{109}	—	November 18, 2014	Haleakala	Pan-STARRS 1	·	1.3 km	MPC · JPL
801682	2014 WT_{110}	—	November 18, 2014	Haleakala	Pan-STARRS 1	·	1.1 km	MPC · JPL
801683	2014 WU_{112}	—	April 27, 2012	Haleakala	Pan-STARRS 1	·	1.0 km	MPC · JPL
801684 Pera	2014 WP_{125}	Pera	September 2, 2014	Roque de los Muchachos	EURONEAR	·	1.3 km	MPC · JPL
801685	2014 WF_{126}	—	November 16, 2014	Mount Lemmon	Mount Lemmon Survey	KOR	960 m	MPC · JPL
801686	2014 WO_{133}	—	October 24, 2014	Kitt Peak	Spacewatch	AGN	880 m	MPC · JPL
801687	2014 WY_{134}	—	November 17, 2014	Haleakala	Pan-STARRS 1	·	1.9 km	MPC · JPL
801688	2014 WB_{137}	—	July 14, 2013	Haleakala	Pan-STARRS 1	·	1.3 km	MPC · JPL
801689	2014 WN_{137}	—	November 17, 2014	Haleakala	Pan-STARRS 1	·	1.3 km	MPC · JPL
801690	2014 WR_{146}	—	October 2, 2008	Kitt Peak	Spacewatch	·	2.3 km	MPC · JPL
801691	2014 WD_{147}	—	October 15, 2014	Kitt Peak	Spacewatch	·	970 m	MPC · JPL
801692	2014 WQ_{151}	—	October 15, 2014	Kitt Peak	Spacewatch	·	1.2 km	MPC · JPL
801693	2014 WP_{152}	—	November 17, 2014	Haleakala	Pan-STARRS 1	EOS	1.2 km	MPC · JPL
801694	2014 WH_{155}	—	November 11, 2014	Haleakala	Pan-STARRS 1	DOR	1.4 km	MPC · JPL
801695	2014 WU_{155}	—	October 18, 2014	Kitt Peak	Spacewatch	·	1.1 km	MPC · JPL
801696	2014 WF_{156}	—	November 17, 2014	Haleakala	Pan-STARRS 1	·	1.1 km	MPC · JPL
801697	2014 WU_{162}	—	October 20, 2014	Mount Lemmon	Mount Lemmon Survey	(5)	910 m	MPC · JPL
801698	2014 WZ_{167}	—	November 19, 2014	Haleakala	Pan-STARRS 1	EOS	1.1 km	MPC · JPL
801699	2014 WC_{172}	—	October 14, 2014	Kitt Peak	Spacewatch	·	1.5 km	MPC · JPL
801700	2014 WV_{172}	—	November 20, 2014	Mount Lemmon	Mount Lemmon Survey	·	980 m	MPC · JPL

== 801701–801800 ==
back to top

Designation			Discovery			Properties		Ref
Permanent	Provisional	Named after	Date	Site	Discoverer(s)	Category	Diam.	Ref
801701	2014 WB_{174}	—	November 20, 2014	Mount Lemmon	Mount Lemmon Survey	·	1.2 km	MPC · JPL
801702	2014 WC_{174}	—	January 30, 2011	Mount Lemmon	Mount Lemmon Survey	·	1.2 km	MPC · JPL
801703	2014 WM_{175}	—	October 2, 2014	Haleakala	Pan-STARRS 1	HNS	690 m	MPC · JPL
801704	2014 WL_{177}	—	October 7, 2005	Mount Lemmon	Mount Lemmon Survey	·	900 m	MPC · JPL
801705	2014 WR_{178}	—	October 2, 2014	Haleakala	Pan-STARRS 1	·	1.5 km	MPC · JPL
801706	2014 WK_{187}	—	March 29, 2012	Haleakala	Pan-STARRS 1	·	2.1 km	MPC · JPL
801707	2014 WG_{188}	—	September 20, 2014	Haleakala	Pan-STARRS 1	·	2.3 km	MPC · JPL
801708	2014 WD_{194}	—	July 14, 2013	Haleakala	Pan-STARRS 1	·	2.1 km	MPC · JPL
801709	2014 WR_{197}	—	March 9, 2011	Mount Lemmon	Mount Lemmon Survey	·	1.4 km	MPC · JPL
801710	2014 WV_{198}	—	August 12, 2013	Haleakala	Pan-STARRS 1	·	2.4 km	MPC · JPL
801711	2014 WA_{199}	—	October 26, 2014	Haleakala	Pan-STARRS 1	MAR	730 m	MPC · JPL
801712	2014 WF_{199}	—	November 21, 2014	Haleakala	Pan-STARRS 1	·	1.1 km	MPC · JPL
801713	2014 WT_{206}	—	November 17, 2014	Mount Lemmon	Mount Lemmon Survey	·	1.1 km	MPC · JPL
801714	2014 WR_{208}	—	October 3, 2014	Mount Lemmon	Mount Lemmon Survey	MRX	690 m	MPC · JPL
801715	2014 WB_{217}	—	August 31, 2014	Haleakala	Pan-STARRS 1	·	2.4 km	MPC · JPL
801716	2014 WO_{217}	—	November 17, 2014	Mount Lemmon	Mount Lemmon Survey	·	1.5 km	MPC · JPL
801717	2014 WH_{223}	—	November 18, 2014	Haleakala	Pan-STARRS 1	·	1.1 km	MPC · JPL
801718	2014 WX_{227}	—	November 18, 2014	Haleakala	Pan-STARRS 1	·	1.4 km	MPC · JPL
801719	2014 WS_{234}	—	November 20, 2014	Mount Lemmon	Mount Lemmon Survey	·	1.3 km	MPC · JPL
801720	2014 WN_{235}	—	November 20, 2014	Mount Lemmon	Mount Lemmon Survey	·	1.2 km	MPC · JPL
801721	2014 WY_{236}	—	September 16, 2009	Mount Lemmon	Mount Lemmon Survey	·	1.1 km	MPC · JPL
801722	2014 WB_{238}	—	November 20, 2014	Haleakala	Pan-STARRS 1	PAD	1.1 km	MPC · JPL
801723	2014 WX_{240}	—	November 20, 2014	Haleakala	Pan-STARRS 1	·	1.2 km	MPC · JPL
801724	2014 WQ_{244}	—	October 29, 2014	Haleakala	Pan-STARRS 1	·	1.0 km	MPC · JPL
801725	2014 WE_{254}	—	September 22, 2014	Haleakala	Pan-STARRS 1	(5)	880 m	MPC · JPL
801726	2014 WW_{254}	—	November 21, 2014	Haleakala	Pan-STARRS 1	·	1.1 km	MPC · JPL
801727	2014 WD_{255}	—	November 21, 2014	Haleakala	Pan-STARRS 1	·	2.6 km	MPC · JPL
801728	2014 WR_{257}	—	January 13, 2011	Kitt Peak	Spacewatch	·	1.2 km	MPC · JPL
801729	2014 WL_{260}	—	November 21, 2014	Haleakala	Pan-STARRS 1	·	900 m	MPC · JPL
801730	2014 WS_{263}	—	November 14, 2010	Mount Lemmon	Mount Lemmon Survey	·	820 m	MPC · JPL
801731	2014 WU_{263}	—	November 21, 2014	Haleakala	Pan-STARRS 1	WIT	770 m	MPC · JPL
801732	2014 WM_{265}	—	April 27, 2012	Haleakala	Pan-STARRS 1	·	1.5 km	MPC · JPL
801733 Maxteodorescu	2014 WS_{267}	Maxteodorescu	September 1, 2014	Roque de los Muchachos	EURONEAR	HNS	920 m	MPC · JPL
801734	2014 WF_{273}	—	November 21, 2014	Haleakala	Pan-STARRS 1	·	1.2 km	MPC · JPL
801735	2014 WJ_{273}	—	November 21, 2014	Haleakala	Pan-STARRS 1	·	1.1 km	MPC · JPL
801736	2014 WC_{274}	—	November 21, 2014	Haleakala	Pan-STARRS 1	·	1.7 km	MPC · JPL
801737	2014 WG_{275}	—	September 20, 2014	Haleakala	Pan-STARRS 1	·	1.3 km	MPC · JPL
801738	2014 WQ_{276}	—	November 21, 2014	Haleakala	Pan-STARRS 1	·	1.2 km	MPC · JPL
801739	2014 WR_{284}	—	November 21, 2014	Haleakala	Pan-STARRS 1	·	2.0 km	MPC · JPL
801740	2014 WX_{288}	—	September 1, 2005	Kitt Peak	Spacewatch	·	910 m	MPC · JPL
801741	2014 WG_{289}	—	March 29, 2011	Catalina	CSS	·	1.9 km	MPC · JPL
801742	2014 WX_{291}	—	November 21, 2014	Haleakala	Pan-STARRS 1	·	1.2 km	MPC · JPL
801743	2014 WJ_{292}	—	November 21, 2014	Haleakala	Pan-STARRS 1	·	1.2 km	MPC · JPL
801744	2014 WM_{292}	—	November 21, 2014	Haleakala	Pan-STARRS 1	·	1.3 km	MPC · JPL
801745	2014 WB_{294}	—	November 21, 2014	Haleakala	Pan-STARRS 1	EUN	850 m	MPC · JPL
801746	2014 WO_{294}	—	November 21, 2014	Haleakala	Pan-STARRS 1	526	1.3 km	MPC · JPL
801747	2014 WF_{296}	—	November 21, 2014	Haleakala	Pan-STARRS 1	·	1.7 km	MPC · JPL
801748	2014 WQ_{296}	—	November 21, 2014	Haleakala	Pan-STARRS 1	EOS	1.4 km	MPC · JPL
801749	2014 WV_{297}	—	November 21, 2014	Haleakala	Pan-STARRS 1	·	2.1 km	MPC · JPL
801750	2014 WB_{304}	—	November 22, 2014	Mount Lemmon	Mount Lemmon Survey	·	1.6 km	MPC · JPL
801751	2014 WO_{304}	—	October 28, 2014	Haleakala	Pan-STARRS 1	·	1.5 km	MPC · JPL
801752	2014 WL_{308}	—	November 22, 2014	Mount Lemmon	Mount Lemmon Survey	·	870 m	MPC · JPL
801753	2014 WR_{308}	—	July 16, 2013	Haleakala	Pan-STARRS 1	·	1.6 km	MPC · JPL
801754	2014 WS_{309}	—	August 25, 2014	Haleakala	Pan-STARRS 1	ADE	1.3 km	MPC · JPL
801755	2014 WP_{311}	—	November 22, 2014	Mount Lemmon	Mount Lemmon Survey	·	1.1 km	MPC · JPL
801756	2014 WU_{315}	—	November 22, 2014	Haleakala	Pan-STARRS 1	·	1.8 km	MPC · JPL
801757	2014 WW_{315}	—	September 16, 2014	Haleakala	Pan-STARRS 1	·	1.4 km	MPC · JPL
801758	2014 WR_{316}	—	January 30, 2011	Mount Lemmon	Mount Lemmon Survey	·	1.3 km	MPC · JPL
801759	2014 WF_{317}	—	October 2, 2014	Haleakala	Pan-STARRS 1	·	1.1 km	MPC · JPL
801760	2014 WS_{317}	—	August 23, 2014	Haleakala	Pan-STARRS 1	critical	480 m	MPC · JPL
801761	2014 WY_{318}	—	September 18, 2014	Haleakala	Pan-STARRS 1	EOS	1.3 km	MPC · JPL
801762	2014 WB_{322}	—	October 28, 2014	Mount Lemmon	Mount Lemmon Survey	·	2.3 km	MPC · JPL
801763	2014 WC_{326}	—	November 12, 2014	Haleakala	Pan-STARRS 1	·	1.2 km	MPC · JPL
801764	2014 WM_{326}	—	October 29, 2014	Haleakala	Pan-STARRS 1	·	1.4 km	MPC · JPL
801765	2014 WH_{328}	—	November 22, 2014	Haleakala	Pan-STARRS 1	·	1.1 km	MPC · JPL
801766	2014 WU_{329}	—	November 22, 2014	Haleakala	Pan-STARRS 1	·	1.3 km	MPC · JPL
801767	2014 WX_{329}	—	November 22, 2014	Haleakala	Pan-STARRS 1	·	1.2 km	MPC · JPL
801768	2014 WE_{331}	—	September 20, 2014	Haleakala	Pan-STARRS 1	·	1.1 km	MPC · JPL
801769	2014 WZ_{332}	—	November 22, 2014	Haleakala	Pan-STARRS 1	·	2.8 km	MPC · JPL
801770	2014 WU_{333}	—	November 22, 2014	Haleakala	Pan-STARRS 1	·	2.0 km	MPC · JPL
801771	2014 WU_{334}	—	November 22, 2014	Haleakala	Pan-STARRS 1	EOS	1.4 km	MPC · JPL
801772	2014 WJ_{335}	—	November 22, 2014	Haleakala	Pan-STARRS 1	EOS	1.2 km	MPC · JPL
801773	2014 WM_{335}	—	September 22, 2014	Haleakala	Pan-STARRS 1	·	900 m	MPC · JPL
801774	2014 WG_{336}	—	March 2, 2011	Mount Lemmon	Mount Lemmon Survey	GEF	790 m	MPC · JPL
801775	2014 WX_{337}	—	November 22, 2014	Haleakala	Pan-STARRS 1	·	2.2 km	MPC · JPL
801776	2014 WQ_{338}	—	November 22, 2014	Haleakala	Pan-STARRS 1	·	890 m	MPC · JPL
801777	2014 WY_{339}	—	November 22, 2014	Haleakala	Pan-STARRS 1	·	1.6 km	MPC · JPL
801778	2014 WP_{343}	—	November 22, 2014	Haleakala	Pan-STARRS 1	·	1.2 km	MPC · JPL
801779	2014 WY_{343}	—	November 22, 2014	Haleakala	Pan-STARRS 1	EUN	850 m	MPC · JPL
801780	2014 WC_{358}	—	November 26, 2011	Mount Lemmon	Mount Lemmon Survey	·	680 m	MPC · JPL
801781	2014 WG_{371}	—	November 26, 2014	Haleakala	Pan-STARRS 1	·	1.4 km	MPC · JPL
801782	2014 WK_{375}	—	November 22, 2014	Mount Lemmon	Mount Lemmon Survey	(5)	910 m	MPC · JPL
801783	2014 WQ_{383}	—	August 25, 2014	Haleakala	Pan-STARRS 1	·	1.6 km	MPC · JPL
801784	2014 WB_{384}	—	October 29, 2014	Kitt Peak	Spacewatch	·	920 m	MPC · JPL
801785	2014 WP_{388}	—	November 23, 2014	Haleakala	Pan-STARRS 1	·	900 m	MPC · JPL
801786	2014 WX_{390}	—	November 24, 2014	Mount Lemmon	Mount Lemmon Survey	·	1.8 km	MPC · JPL
801787	2014 WK_{392}	—	June 1, 2013	Kitt Peak	Spacewatch	·	930 m	MPC · JPL
801788	2014 WA_{399}	—	November 25, 2014	Mount Lemmon	Mount Lemmon Survey	VER	1.8 km	MPC · JPL
801789	2014 WR_{400}	—	November 26, 2014	Mount Lemmon	Mount Lemmon Survey	·	1.9 km	MPC · JPL
801790	2014 WQ_{401}	—	September 24, 2008	Mount Lemmon	Mount Lemmon Survey	EOS	1.5 km	MPC · JPL
801791	2014 WB_{404}	—	August 8, 2013	Haleakala	Pan-STARRS 1	KOR	1.0 km	MPC · JPL
801792	2014 WW_{404}	—	November 26, 2014	Haleakala	Pan-STARRS 1	·	990 m	MPC · JPL
801793	2014 WN_{415}	—	November 26, 2014	Haleakala	Pan-STARRS 1	RAF	600 m	MPC · JPL
801794	2014 WC_{418}	—	November 26, 2014	Haleakala	Pan-STARRS 1	·	1.0 km	MPC · JPL
801795	2014 WX_{418}	—	November 26, 2014	Haleakala	Pan-STARRS 1	·	880 m	MPC · JPL
801796	2014 WU_{420}	—	November 26, 2014	Haleakala	Pan-STARRS 1	·	1.2 km	MPC · JPL
801797	2014 WR_{425}	—	September 21, 2009	Mount Lemmon	Mount Lemmon Survey	·	1.5 km	MPC · JPL
801798	2014 WB_{426}	—	September 15, 2013	Mount Lemmon	Mount Lemmon Survey	·	1.7 km	MPC · JPL
801799	2014 WD_{431}	—	January 30, 2011	Mount Lemmon	Mount Lemmon Survey	·	1.6 km	MPC · JPL
801800	2014 WN_{431}	—	November 16, 2014	Kitt Peak	Spacewatch	·	2.4 km	MPC · JPL

== 801801–801900 ==
back to top

Designation			Discovery			Properties		Ref
Permanent	Provisional	Named after	Date	Site	Discoverer(s)	Category	Diam.	Ref
801801	2014 WW_{437}	—	November 27, 2014	Haleakala	Pan-STARRS 1	·	450 m	MPC · JPL
801802	2014 WC_{438}	—	November 27, 2014	Haleakala	Pan-STARRS 1	·	1.3 km	MPC · JPL
801803	2014 WE_{440}	—	November 23, 2014	Mount Lemmon	Mount Lemmon Survey	·	1.2 km	MPC · JPL
801804	2014 WQ_{442}	—	November 27, 2014	Haleakala	Pan-STARRS 1	AGN	770 m	MPC · JPL
801805	2014 WR_{442}	—	October 23, 2005	Kitt Peak	Spacewatch	·	1.1 km	MPC · JPL
801806	2014 WB_{443}	—	January 16, 2011	Mount Lemmon	Mount Lemmon Survey	·	1.2 km	MPC · JPL
801807	2014 WD_{443}	—	January 29, 2011	Mount Lemmon	Mount Lemmon Survey	·	1.2 km	MPC · JPL
801808	2014 WV_{446}	—	November 23, 2014	Mount Lemmon	Mount Lemmon Survey	GAL	1.0 km	MPC · JPL
801809	2014 WP_{448}	—	November 20, 2014	Mount Lemmon	Mount Lemmon Survey	EUN	850 m	MPC · JPL
801810	2014 WV_{450}	—	November 27, 2014	Haleakala	Pan-STARRS 1	VER	1.9 km	MPC · JPL
801811	2014 WA_{452}	—	November 27, 2014	Haleakala	Pan-STARRS 1	·	1.5 km	MPC · JPL
801812	2014 WO_{462}	—	November 17, 2014	Haleakala	Pan-STARRS 1	·	1.1 km	MPC · JPL
801813	2014 WP_{462}	—	November 17, 2014	Haleakala	Pan-STARRS 1	HNS	820 m	MPC · JPL
801814	2014 WX_{463}	—	November 17, 2014	Haleakala	Pan-STARRS 1	·	1.1 km	MPC · JPL
801815	2014 WG_{464}	—	November 17, 2014	Haleakala	Pan-STARRS 1	·	1.1 km	MPC · JPL
801816	2014 WA_{473}	—	July 8, 2005	Kitt Peak	Spacewatch	RAF	570 m	MPC · JPL
801817	2014 WP_{473}	—	November 28, 2014	Mount Lemmon	Mount Lemmon Survey	·	2.0 km	MPC · JPL
801818	2014 WC_{474}	—	November 21, 2014	Haleakala	Pan-STARRS 1	MAR	840 m	MPC · JPL
801819	2014 WB_{484}	—	November 29, 2014	Mount Lemmon	Mount Lemmon Survey	HNS	1 km	MPC · JPL
801820	2014 WN_{486}	—	February 5, 2011	Haleakala	Pan-STARRS 1	·	1.2 km	MPC · JPL
801821	2014 WA_{487}	—	October 31, 2014	Mount Lemmon	Mount Lemmon Survey	·	1.3 km	MPC · JPL
801822	2014 WM_{489}	—	November 23, 2014	Haleakala	Pan-STARRS 1	·	1.7 km	MPC · JPL
801823	2014 WL_{490}	—	November 30, 2014	Haleakala	Pan-STARRS 1	(194)	1.0 km	MPC · JPL
801824	2014 WT_{496}	—	November 30, 2014	Haleakala	Pan-STARRS 1	·	1.3 km	MPC · JPL
801825	2014 WB_{501}	—	September 24, 2014	Mount Lemmon	Mount Lemmon Survey	·	1.2 km	MPC · JPL
801826	2014 WE_{501}	—	September 23, 2014	Haleakala	Pan-STARRS 1	H	360 m	MPC · JPL
801827	2014 WO_{504}	—	September 16, 2014	Haleakala	Pan-STARRS 1	·	1.6 km	MPC · JPL
801828	2014 WT_{507}	—	October 28, 2014	Haleakala	Pan-STARRS 1	·	1.5 km	MPC · JPL
801829	2014 WH_{515}	—	November 30, 2003	Kitt Peak	Spacewatch	·	1.7 km	MPC · JPL
801830	2014 WR_{520}	—	March 28, 2012	Kitt Peak	Spacewatch	·	1.2 km	MPC · JPL
801831	2014 WW_{522}	—	November 17, 2014	Haleakala	Pan-STARRS 1	·	1.2 km	MPC · JPL
801832	2014 WH_{523}	—	November 17, 2014	Haleakala	Pan-STARRS 1	·	1.1 km	MPC · JPL
801833	2014 WJ_{523}	—	November 17, 2014	Haleakala	Pan-STARRS 1	·	980 m	MPC · JPL
801834	2014 WO_{523}	—	November 17, 2014	Haleakala	Pan-STARRS 1	·	1.2 km	MPC · JPL
801835	2014 WX_{523}	—	November 17, 2014	Haleakala	Pan-STARRS 1	·	1.2 km	MPC · JPL
801836	2014 WY_{523}	—	October 21, 2014	Kitt Peak	Spacewatch	JUN	1.1 km	MPC · JPL
801837	2014 WP_{525}	—	November 20, 2014	Haleakala	Pan-STARRS 1	ADE	1.5 km	MPC · JPL
801838	2014 WQ_{525}	—	November 20, 2014	Haleakala	Pan-STARRS 1	·	1.3 km	MPC · JPL
801839	2014 WF_{528}	—	November 22, 2014	Mount Lemmon	Mount Lemmon Survey	·	1.3 km	MPC · JPL
801840	2014 WO_{528}	—	November 22, 2014	Haleakala	Pan-STARRS 1	(1118)	2.5 km	MPC · JPL
801841	2014 WZ_{531}	—	March 2, 2011	Kitt Peak	Spacewatch	·	1.4 km	MPC · JPL
801842	2014 WC_{532}	—	November 26, 2014	Haleakala	Pan-STARRS 1	·	2.2 km	MPC · JPL
801843	2014 WD_{537}	—	October 29, 2014	Kitt Peak	Spacewatch	·	690 m	MPC · JPL
801844	2014 WM_{537}	—	November 27, 2014	Haleakala	Pan-STARRS 1	·	530 m	MPC · JPL
801845	2014 WR_{537}	—	November 22, 2014	Mount Lemmon	Mount Lemmon Survey	·	1.3 km	MPC · JPL
801846	2014 WP_{539}	—	November 17, 2014	Haleakala	Pan-STARRS 1	·	780 m	MPC · JPL
801847	2014 WB_{541}	—	November 17, 2014	Haleakala	Pan-STARRS 1	HNS	730 m	MPC · JPL
801848	2014 WH_{541}	—	November 21, 2014	Haleakala	Pan-STARRS 1	·	1.1 km	MPC · JPL
801849	2014 WQ_{541}	—	November 27, 2014	Haleakala	Pan-STARRS 1	·	1.3 km	MPC · JPL
801850	2014 WL_{543}	—	November 21, 2014	Haleakala	Pan-STARRS 1	·	1.1 km	MPC · JPL
801851	2014 WV_{550}	—	January 31, 2016	Haleakala	Pan-STARRS 1	·	1.2 km	MPC · JPL
801852	2014 WT_{552}	—	November 16, 2014	Haleakala	Pan-STARRS 1	·	1.3 km	MPC · JPL
801853	2014 WM_{553}	—	October 24, 2005	Kitt Peak	Spacewatch	·	1.1 km	MPC · JPL
801854	2014 WF_{554}	—	November 30, 2014	Haleakala	Pan-STARRS 1	·	830 m	MPC · JPL
801855	2014 WU_{555}	—	November 26, 2014	Haleakala	Pan-STARRS 1	·	1.3 km	MPC · JPL
801856	2014 WX_{555}	—	November 26, 2014	ASC-Kislovodsk	Linkov, V., Polyakov, K.	H	580 m	MPC · JPL
801857	2014 WJ_{557}	—	November 19, 2014	Haleakala	Pan-STARRS 1	·	1.4 km	MPC · JPL
801858	2014 WZ_{558}	—	January 17, 2016	Haleakala	Pan-STARRS 1	EOS	1.3 km	MPC · JPL
801859	2014 WS_{561}	—	November 25, 2014	Haleakala	Pan-STARRS 1	·	1.2 km	MPC · JPL
801860	2014 WC_{562}	—	January 30, 2016	Mount Lemmon	Mount Lemmon Survey	·	1.9 km	MPC · JPL
801861	2014 WV_{562}	—	November 28, 2014	Haleakala	Pan-STARRS 1	DOR	1.5 km	MPC · JPL
801862	2014 WY_{562}	—	November 30, 2014	Mount Lemmon	Mount Lemmon Survey	·	2.1 km	MPC · JPL
801863	2014 WR_{564}	—	November 27, 2014	Haleakala	Pan-STARRS 1	VER	2.0 km	MPC · JPL
801864	2014 WA_{566}	—	November 22, 2014	Haleakala	Pan-STARRS 1	·	1.8 km	MPC · JPL
801865	2014 WU_{568}	—	November 27, 2014	Haleakala	Pan-STARRS 1	·	1.1 km	MPC · JPL
801866	2014 WV_{568}	—	November 28, 2014	Haleakala	Pan-STARRS 1	·	1.1 km	MPC · JPL
801867	2014 WC_{569}	—	November 22, 2014	Haleakala	Pan-STARRS 1	·	1.2 km	MPC · JPL
801868	2014 WG_{569}	—	November 17, 2014	Mount Lemmon	Mount Lemmon Survey	·	1.9 km	MPC · JPL
801869	2014 WU_{569}	—	November 27, 2014	Haleakala	Pan-STARRS 1	·	1.6 km	MPC · JPL
801870	2014 WA_{570}	—	November 28, 2014	Haleakala	Pan-STARRS 1	·	1.2 km	MPC · JPL
801871	2014 WO_{570}	—	November 18, 2014	Mount Lemmon	Mount Lemmon Survey	·	1.1 km	MPC · JPL
801872	2014 WZ_{570}	—	November 21, 2014	Haleakala	Pan-STARRS 1	L5	6.7 km	MPC · JPL
801873	2014 WB_{571}	—	November 22, 2014	Mount Lemmon	Mount Lemmon Survey	BRA	1.3 km	MPC · JPL
801874	2014 WC_{571}	—	November 26, 2014	Haleakala	Pan-STARRS 1	·	2.3 km	MPC · JPL
801875	2014 WH_{571}	—	November 26, 2014	Haleakala	Pan-STARRS 1	·	1.2 km	MPC · JPL
801876	2014 WQ_{571}	—	November 21, 2014	Haleakala	Pan-STARRS 1	·	1.0 km	MPC · JPL
801877	2014 WB_{572}	—	November 17, 2014	Haleakala	Pan-STARRS 1	·	1.2 km	MPC · JPL
801878	2014 WW_{572}	—	November 21, 2014	Haleakala	Pan-STARRS 1	·	1.2 km	MPC · JPL
801879	2014 WE_{573}	—	November 28, 2014	Haleakala	Pan-STARRS 1	L5	7.1 km	MPC · JPL
801880	2014 WL_{573}	—	November 19, 2014	Mount Lemmon	Mount Lemmon Survey	·	1.4 km	MPC · JPL
801881	2014 WG_{574}	—	November 17, 2014	Mount Lemmon	Mount Lemmon Survey	L5	7.2 km	MPC · JPL
801882	2014 WT_{574}	—	November 22, 2014	Mount Lemmon	Mount Lemmon Survey	·	1.0 km	MPC · JPL
801883	2014 WF_{576}	—	November 27, 2014	Mount Lemmon	Mount Lemmon Survey	EUN	960 m	MPC · JPL
801884	2014 WD_{579}	—	November 20, 2014	Mount Lemmon	Mount Lemmon Survey	·	1.1 km	MPC · JPL
801885	2014 WX_{580}	—	November 21, 2014	Haleakala	Pan-STARRS 1	ELF	2.4 km	MPC · JPL
801886	2014 WA_{582}	—	November 17, 2014	Mount Lemmon	Mount Lemmon Survey	·	1.3 km	MPC · JPL
801887	2014 WS_{583}	—	November 17, 2014	Haleakala	Pan-STARRS 1	·	1.2 km	MPC · JPL
801888	2014 WV_{583}	—	November 26, 2014	Haleakala	Pan-STARRS 1	·	2.6 km	MPC · JPL
801889	2014 WW_{583}	—	November 26, 2014	Haleakala	Pan-STARRS 1	·	2.2 km	MPC · JPL
801890	2014 WU_{587}	—	November 26, 2014	Haleakala	Pan-STARRS 1	·	2.0 km	MPC · JPL
801891	2014 WV_{588}	—	November 26, 2014	Haleakala	Pan-STARRS 1	·	2.0 km	MPC · JPL
801892	2014 WG_{590}	—	November 22, 2014	Haleakala	Pan-STARRS 1	·	1.5 km	MPC · JPL
801893	2014 WJ_{590}	—	November 17, 2014	Haleakala	Pan-STARRS 1	·	1.5 km	MPC · JPL
801894	2014 WO_{590}	—	November 26, 2014	Haleakala	Pan-STARRS 1	·	1.2 km	MPC · JPL
801895	2014 WT_{590}	—	November 21, 2014	Haleakala	Pan-STARRS 1	·	1.1 km	MPC · JPL
801896	2014 WM_{591}	—	November 21, 2014	Haleakala	Pan-STARRS 1	·	1.1 km	MPC · JPL
801897	2014 WF_{594}	—	November 28, 2014	Mount Lemmon	Mount Lemmon Survey	L5	5.6 km	MPC · JPL
801898	2014 WS_{595}	—	November 17, 2014	Haleakala	Pan-STARRS 1	L5	5.4 km	MPC · JPL
801899	2014 WT_{596}	—	August 31, 2014	Haleakala	Pan-STARRS 1	·	890 m	MPC · JPL
801900	2014 WB_{597}	—	November 27, 2014	Kitt Peak	Spacewatch	KOR	1.0 km	MPC · JPL

== 801901–802000 ==
back to top

Designation			Discovery			Properties		Ref
Permanent	Provisional	Named after	Date	Site	Discoverer(s)	Category	Diam.	Ref
801901	2014 WG_{597}	—	November 21, 2014	Haleakala	Pan-STARRS 1	·	1.3 km	MPC · JPL
801902	2014 WL_{597}	—	November 26, 2014	Haleakala	Pan-STARRS 1	HNS	720 m	MPC · JPL
801903	2014 WA_{598}	—	November 26, 2014	Haleakala	Pan-STARRS 1	·	1.4 km	MPC · JPL
801904	2014 WB_{598}	—	November 16, 2014	Mount Lemmon	Mount Lemmon Survey	EOS	1.2 km	MPC · JPL
801905	2014 WG_{598}	—	November 21, 2014	Haleakala	Pan-STARRS 1	·	1.4 km	MPC · JPL
801906	2014 WU_{598}	—	November 28, 2014	Haleakala	Pan-STARRS 1	·	1.1 km	MPC · JPL
801907	2014 WB_{608}	—	November 26, 2014	Haleakala	Pan-STARRS 1	·	2.2 km	MPC · JPL
801908	2014 WU_{610}	—	November 22, 2014	Haleakala	Pan-STARRS 1	·	960 m	MPC · JPL
801909	2014 WT_{611}	—	November 20, 2014	Haleakala	Pan-STARRS 1	·	2.4 km	MPC · JPL
801910	2014 WR_{612}	—	November 17, 2014	Mount Lemmon	Mount Lemmon Survey	·	2.2 km	MPC · JPL
801911	2014 WL_{613}	—	November 26, 2014	Haleakala	Pan-STARRS 1	·	1.6 km	MPC · JPL
801912	2014 WQ_{614}	—	November 22, 2014	Mount Lemmon	Mount Lemmon Survey	·	1.1 km	MPC · JPL
801913	2014 WU_{614}	—	November 21, 2014	Haleakala	Pan-STARRS 1	·	720 m	MPC · JPL
801914	2014 WW_{614}	—	November 17, 2014	Haleakala	Pan-STARRS 1	EOS	1.3 km	MPC · JPL
801915	2014 WA_{615}	—	November 21, 2014	Haleakala	Pan-STARRS 1	VER	2.0 km	MPC · JPL
801916	2014 WO_{615}	—	November 24, 2014	Mount Lemmon	Mount Lemmon Survey	·	1.4 km	MPC · JPL
801917	2014 XA_{1}	—	December 1, 2014	Haleakala	Pan-STARRS 1	·	1.8 km	MPC · JPL
801918	2014 XY_{2}	—	October 27, 2009	Kitt Peak	Spacewatch	·	1.6 km	MPC · JPL
801919	2014 XW_{22}	—	December 11, 2014	Mount Lemmon	Mount Lemmon Survey	·	690 m	MPC · JPL
801920	2014 XN_{25}	—	December 11, 2014	Mount Lemmon	Mount Lemmon Survey	·	2.3 km	MPC · JPL
801921	2014 XV_{25}	—	November 25, 2005	Kitt Peak	Spacewatch	MRX	700 m	MPC · JPL
801922	2014 XP_{29}	—	May 15, 2012	Haleakala	Pan-STARRS 1	·	1.5 km	MPC · JPL
801923	2014 XW_{30}	—	November 26, 2014	Mount Lemmon	Mount Lemmon Survey	MAR	780 m	MPC · JPL
801924	2014 XR_{34}	—	September 20, 2009	Kitt Peak	Spacewatch	·	1.2 km	MPC · JPL
801925	2014 XY_{35}	—	May 3, 2013	Mount Lemmon	Mount Lemmon Survey	·	1.7 km	MPC · JPL
801926	2014 XM_{42}	—	December 1, 2014	Haleakala	Pan-STARRS 1	·	1.6 km	MPC · JPL
801927	2014 XK_{45}	—	December 12, 2014	Haleakala	Pan-STARRS 1	·	1.3 km	MPC · JPL
801928	2014 XR_{45}	—	December 13, 2014	Haleakala	Pan-STARRS 1	3:2 · SHU	4.2 km	MPC · JPL
801929	2014 XF_{47}	—	December 15, 2014	Mount Lemmon	Mount Lemmon Survey	·	1.2 km	MPC · JPL
801930	2014 XX_{48}	—	June 15, 2018	Haleakala	Pan-STARRS 1	·	1.8 km	MPC · JPL
801931	2014 XF_{49}	—	December 11, 2014	Mount Lemmon	Mount Lemmon Survey	·	1.4 km	MPC · JPL
801932	2014 XU_{49}	—	December 11, 2014	Mount Lemmon	Mount Lemmon Survey	·	2.2 km	MPC · JPL
801933	2014 XG_{52}	—	December 11, 2014	Mount Lemmon	Mount Lemmon Survey	·	1.3 km	MPC · JPL
801934	2014 XZ_{53}	—	December 3, 2014	Haleakala	Pan-STARRS 1	·	1.5 km	MPC · JPL
801935	2014 XD_{55}	—	December 2, 2014	Haleakala	Pan-STARRS 1	·	1.5 km	MPC · JPL
801936	2014 XJ_{56}	—	December 1, 2014	Kitt Peak	Spacewatch	·	1.0 km	MPC · JPL
801937	2014 XX_{56}	—	December 1, 2014	Haleakala	Pan-STARRS 1	·	1.7 km	MPC · JPL
801938	2014 YW_{3}	—	December 18, 2014	Haleakala	Pan-STARRS 1	H	400 m	MPC · JPL
801939	2014 YD_{12}	—	November 30, 2014	Mount Lemmon	Mount Lemmon Survey	·	540 m	MPC · JPL
801940	2014 YM_{19}	—	December 10, 2014	Mount Lemmon	Mount Lemmon Survey	·	1.5 km	MPC · JPL
801941	2014 YZ_{19}	—	January 28, 2011	Mount Lemmon	Mount Lemmon Survey	·	1.1 km	MPC · JPL
801942	2014 YU_{27}	—	April 2, 2011	Haleakala	Pan-STARRS 1	MRX	740 m	MPC · JPL
801943	2014 YC_{38}	—	December 21, 2014	Haleakala	Pan-STARRS 1	·	1.5 km	MPC · JPL
801944	2014 YU_{43}	—	December 30, 2014	Mayhill-ISON	L. Elenin	AMO	400 m	MPC · JPL
801945	2014 YT_{59}	—	December 21, 2014	Haleakala	Pan-STARRS 1	·	840 m	MPC · JPL
801946	2014 YY_{59}	—	December 21, 2014	Haleakala	Pan-STARRS 1	·	2.2 km	MPC · JPL
801947	2014 YG_{71}	—	December 21, 2014	Haleakala	Pan-STARRS 1	·	1.6 km	MPC · JPL
801948	2014 YH_{72}	—	December 16, 2014	Haleakala	Pan-STARRS 1	·	1.9 km	MPC · JPL
801949	2014 YS_{75}	—	December 26, 2014	Haleakala	Pan-STARRS 1	·	2.2 km	MPC · JPL
801950	2014 YB_{77}	—	December 29, 2014	Mount Lemmon	Mount Lemmon Survey	·	1.6 km	MPC · JPL
801951	2014 YN_{77}	—	December 18, 2014	Haleakala	Pan-STARRS 1	·	1.8 km	MPC · JPL
801952	2014 YU_{77}	—	December 24, 2014	Mount Lemmon	Mount Lemmon Survey	·	1.5 km	MPC · JPL
801953	2014 YM_{78}	—	December 21, 2014	Haleakala	Pan-STARRS 1	·	1.3 km	MPC · JPL
801954	2014 YJ_{79}	—	December 16, 2014	Haleakala	Pan-STARRS 1	·	1.2 km	MPC · JPL
801955	2014 YK_{79}	—	December 29, 2014	Haleakala	Pan-STARRS 1	·	1.5 km	MPC · JPL
801956	2014 YF_{80}	—	December 29, 2014	Haleakala	Pan-STARRS 1	PHO	830 m	MPC · JPL
801957	2014 YA_{83}	—	December 20, 2014	Haleakala	Pan-STARRS 1	·	1.2 km	MPC · JPL
801958	2014 YR_{84}	—	December 21, 2014	Haleakala	Pan-STARRS 1	SYL	3.1 km	MPC · JPL
801959	2014 YD_{86}	—	December 21, 2014	Haleakala	Pan-STARRS 1	·	2.2 km	MPC · JPL
801960	2014 YT_{86}	—	December 20, 2014	Haleakala	Pan-STARRS 1	·	1.8 km	MPC · JPL
801961	2014 YR_{87}	—	December 21, 2014	Haleakala	Pan-STARRS 1	·	1.1 km	MPC · JPL
801962	2014 YX_{87}	—	December 21, 2014	Haleakala	Pan-STARRS 1	·	1.1 km	MPC · JPL
801963	2014 YD_{88}	—	December 27, 2014	Mount Lemmon	Mount Lemmon Survey	·	1.2 km	MPC · JPL
801964	2014 YX_{88}	—	December 29, 2014	Haleakala	Pan-STARRS 1	MRX	830 m	MPC · JPL
801965	2014 YT_{89}	—	December 20, 2014	Haleakala	Pan-STARRS 1	HNS	880 m	MPC · JPL
801966	2014 YR_{95}	—	December 26, 2014	Haleakala	Pan-STARRS 1	·	2.0 km	MPC · JPL
801967	2014 YN_{96}	—	December 29, 2014	Haleakala	Pan-STARRS 1	·	1.2 km	MPC · JPL
801968	2014 YZ_{96}	—	December 21, 2014	Haleakala	Pan-STARRS 1	·	2.3 km	MPC · JPL
801969	2014 YP_{97}	—	December 21, 2014	Haleakala	Pan-STARRS 1	·	1.6 km	MPC · JPL
801970	2014 YB_{98}	—	February 8, 2011	Mount Lemmon	Mount Lemmon Survey	·	950 m	MPC · JPL
801971	2014 YD_{98}	—	December 16, 2014	Haleakala	Pan-STARRS 1	·	1.1 km	MPC · JPL
801972	2014 YM_{99}	—	December 29, 2014	Haleakala	Pan-STARRS 1	·	1.3 km	MPC · JPL
801973	2014 YU_{99}	—	December 29, 2014	Mount Lemmon	Mount Lemmon Survey	KOR	1.1 km	MPC · JPL
801974	2014 YJ_{100}	—	December 21, 2014	Haleakala	Pan-STARRS 1	EOS	1.3 km	MPC · JPL
801975	2014 YO_{100}	—	December 21, 2014	Haleakala	Pan-STARRS 1	KOR	910 m	MPC · JPL
801976	2014 YU_{103}	—	December 24, 2014	Mount Lemmon	Mount Lemmon Survey	·	2.0 km	MPC · JPL
801977	2015 AO	—	September 14, 2014	Mount Lemmon	Mount Lemmon Survey	·	1.4 km	MPC · JPL
801978	2015 AO_{4}	—	September 6, 2014	Mount Lemmon	Mount Lemmon Survey	·	1.2 km	MPC · JPL
801979	2015 AM_{5}	—	November 21, 2014	Haleakala	Pan-STARRS 1	HNS	860 m	MPC · JPL
801980	2015 AT_{14}	—	January 11, 2015	Haleakala	Pan-STARRS 1	·	2.3 km	MPC · JPL
801981	2015 AQ_{20}	—	February 13, 2011	Mount Lemmon	Mount Lemmon Survey	·	1.3 km	MPC · JPL
801982	2015 AJ_{21}	—	November 28, 2014	Kitt Peak	Spacewatch	·	2.5 km	MPC · JPL
801983	2015 AU_{22}	—	August 28, 2009	Kitt Peak	Spacewatch	·	1.2 km	MPC · JPL
801984	2015 AL_{23}	—	December 16, 2014	Haleakala	Pan-STARRS 1	·	1.2 km	MPC · JPL
801985	2015 AM_{26}	—	January 12, 2015	Haleakala	Pan-STARRS 1	·	1.6 km	MPC · JPL
801986	2015 AE_{27}	—	June 2, 2013	Mount Lemmon	Mount Lemmon Survey	·	1.3 km	MPC · JPL
801987	2015 AC_{29}	—	January 13, 2015	Haleakala	Pan-STARRS 1	·	2.2 km	MPC · JPL
801988	2015 AU_{30}	—	January 13, 2015	Haleakala	Pan-STARRS 1	KOR	1.0 km	MPC · JPL
801989	2015 AB_{35}	—	December 21, 2014	Haleakala	Pan-STARRS 1	·	1.1 km	MPC · JPL
801990	2015 AC_{51}	—	October 27, 2009	Mount Lemmon	Mount Lemmon Survey	·	1.1 km	MPC · JPL
801991	2015 AW_{51}	—	January 13, 2015	Haleakala	Pan-STARRS 1	·	1.5 km	MPC · JPL
801992	2015 AW_{52}	—	September 22, 2008	Kitt Peak	Spacewatch	·	1.4 km	MPC · JPL
801993	2015 AS_{60}	—	November 5, 2005	Kitt Peak	Spacewatch	·	940 m	MPC · JPL
801994	2015 AJ_{62}	—	January 13, 2015	Haleakala	Pan-STARRS 1	·	2.0 km	MPC · JPL
801995	2015 AQ_{62}	—	January 13, 2015	Haleakala	Pan-STARRS 1	·	2.2 km	MPC · JPL
801996	2015 AS_{65}	—	January 13, 2015	Haleakala	Pan-STARRS 1	·	1.4 km	MPC · JPL
801997	2015 AB_{69}	—	January 13, 2015	Haleakala	Pan-STARRS 1	ADE	1.5 km	MPC · JPL
801998	2015 AJ_{69}	—	January 13, 2015	Haleakala	Pan-STARRS 1	·	1.1 km	MPC · JPL
801999	2015 AS_{74}	—	January 13, 2015	Haleakala	Pan-STARRS 1	·	1.5 km	MPC · JPL
802000	2015 AA_{75}	—	December 21, 2014	Haleakala	Pan-STARRS 1	·	2.0 km	MPC · JPL

back to top

== Meaning of names ==
As minor planet discoveries are confirmed, they are given a permanent number by the IAU's Minor Planet Center (MPC), and the discoverers can then submit names for them, following the IAU's naming conventions. The list below concerns those minor planets in the specified number-range that have received names, and explains the meanings of those names.

Official naming citations of newly named small Solar System bodies are approved and published in a bulletin by IAU's Working Group for Small Bodies Nomenclature (WGSBN). Before May 2021, citations were published in MPC's Minor Planet Circulars for many decades. Recent citations can also be found on the JPL Small-Body Database (SBDB). Until his death in 2016, German astronomer Lutz D. Schmadel compiled these citations into the Dictionary of Minor Planet Names (DMP) and regularly updated the collection.

Based on Paul Herget's The Names of the Minor Planets, Schmadel also researched the unclear origin of numerous asteroids, most of which had been named prior to World War II. This article incorporates text from this source, which is in the public domain: SBDB New namings may only be added to this list below after official publication as the preannouncement of names is condemned. The WGSBN publishes a comprehensive guideline for the naming rules of non-cometary small Solar System bodies.

Named minor planet	Provisional	This minor planet was named for...	Ref · Catalog
801007 Stefanpopcot	2014 NB_{80}	Stefan Pop-Cot , Romanian astronomer and photographer from Cluj-Napoca.	IAU · 801007
801371 Pocora	2014 SO_{62}	Andrei Pocora, Romanian amateur astronomer from Constanța.	IAU · 801371
801684 Pera	2014 WP_{125}	Emil-Stefan Pera, Romanian dentist and amateur astronomer.	IAU · 801684
801733 Maxteodorescu	2014 WS_{267}	Description available (see ref). Please summarize in your own words.	IAU · 801733
