= List of minor planets: 632001–633000 =

The following is a partial list of minor planets, running from minor-planet number 632001 through 633000, inclusive. The primary data for this and other partial lists is based on JPL's "Small-Body Orbital Elements" and data available from the Minor Planet Center. Critical list information is also provided by the MPC, unless otherwise specified from Lowell Observatory. A detailed description of the table's columns and additional sources are given on the main page including a complete list of every page in this series, and a statistical break-up on the dynamical classification of minor planets.

Also see the summary list of all named bodies in numerical and alphabetical order, and the corresponding naming citations for the number range of this particular list. New namings may only be added to this list after official publication, as the preannouncement of names is condemned by the Working Group for Small Bodies Nomenclature of the International Astronomical Union.

Near-Earth obj.	MBA (inner)	MBA (outer)	Centaur
Mars-crosser	MBA (middle)	Jupiter trojan	Trans-Neptunian obj.
Unclassified

== 632001–632100 ==
Designation			Discovery			Properties		Ref
Permanent	Provisional	Named after	Date	Site	Discoverer(s)	Category	Diam.	Ref
632001	2007 XQ_{38}	—	December 13, 2007	Socorro	LINEAR	·	1.5 km	MPC · JPL
632002	2007 XE_{42}	—	December 14, 2007	Kitt Peak	Spacewatch	EUN	860 m	MPC · JPL
632003	2007 XU_{43}	—	December 5, 2007	Kitt Peak	Spacewatch	·	1.7 km	MPC · JPL
632004	2007 XC_{45}	—	December 15, 2007	Kitt Peak	Spacewatch	·	3.1 km	MPC · JPL
632005	2007 XN_{45}	—	December 15, 2007	Kitt Peak	Spacewatch	THM	1.9 km	MPC · JPL
632006	2007 XG_{47}	—	December 15, 2007	Kitt Peak	Spacewatch	·	620 m	MPC · JPL
632007	2007 XB_{54}	—	November 5, 2007	Mount Lemmon	Mount Lemmon Survey	·	3.2 km	MPC · JPL
632008	2007 XL_{59}	—	July 29, 2002	Palomar	NEAT	(194)	1.6 km	MPC · JPL
632009	2007 XM_{60}	—	December 15, 2007	Mount Lemmon	Mount Lemmon Survey	·	860 m	MPC · JPL
632010	2007 XJ_{61}	—	December 3, 2007	Kitt Peak	Spacewatch	·	3.1 km	MPC · JPL
632011	2007 XQ_{62}	—	July 18, 2005	Palomar	NEAT	·	3.3 km	MPC · JPL
632012	2007 XT_{63}	—	May 8, 2005	Kitt Peak	Spacewatch	·	2.7 km	MPC · JPL
632013	2007 XP_{64}	—	December 5, 2007	Mount Lemmon	Mount Lemmon Survey	·	1.8 km	MPC · JPL
632014	2007 XG_{65}	—	October 25, 2011	Haleakala	Pan-STARRS 1	·	1.5 km	MPC · JPL
632015	2007 XG_{68}	—	December 4, 2007	Mount Lemmon	Mount Lemmon Survey	·	890 m	MPC · JPL
632016	2007 XJ_{68}	—	December 6, 2007	Mount Lemmon	Mount Lemmon Survey	·	960 m	MPC · JPL
632017	2007 XD_{69}	—	December 15, 2007	Mount Lemmon	Mount Lemmon Survey	·	1.5 km	MPC · JPL
632018	2007 XK_{69}	—	December 4, 2007	Kitt Peak	Spacewatch	VER	2.6 km	MPC · JPL
632019	2007 XA_{71}	—	December 3, 2007	Kitt Peak	Spacewatch	(43176)	3.0 km	MPC · JPL
632020	2007 XD_{71}	—	December 6, 2007	Mount Lemmon	Mount Lemmon Survey	VER	2.3 km	MPC · JPL
632021	2007 YV	—	December 16, 2007	Bergisch Gladbach	W. Bickel	URS	3.9 km	MPC · JPL
632022	2007 YX_{2}	—	December 17, 2007	Bergisch Gladbach	W. Bickel	ADE	2.1 km	MPC · JPL
632023	2007 YT_{4}	—	March 8, 2003	Kitt Peak	Deep Lens Survey	VER	3.0 km	MPC · JPL
632024	2007 YT_{6}	—	December 16, 2007	Mount Lemmon	Mount Lemmon Survey	·	2.2 km	MPC · JPL
632025	2007 YM_{8}	—	November 19, 2007	Mount Lemmon	Mount Lemmon Survey	·	2.3 km	MPC · JPL
632026	2007 YR_{8}	—	December 16, 2007	Mount Lemmon	Mount Lemmon Survey	·	4.4 km	MPC · JPL
632027	2007 YB_{10}	—	December 16, 2007	Mount Lemmon	Mount Lemmon Survey	·	2.5 km	MPC · JPL
632028	2007 YG_{11}	—	December 17, 2007	Mount Lemmon	Mount Lemmon Survey	·	3.1 km	MPC · JPL
632029	2007 YV_{20}	—	November 14, 2007	Mount Lemmon	Mount Lemmon Survey	·	1.1 km	MPC · JPL
632030	2007 YM_{23}	—	May 23, 2006	Kitt Peak	Spacewatch	·	3.5 km	MPC · JPL
632031	2007 YY_{24}	—	December 18, 2007	Kitt Peak	Spacewatch	MAR	1.2 km	MPC · JPL
632032	2007 YR_{27}	—	December 5, 2007	Kitt Peak	Spacewatch	·	1.4 km	MPC · JPL
632033	2007 YT_{28}	—	December 19, 2007	Kitt Peak	Spacewatch	EOS	1.9 km	MPC · JPL
632034	2007 YA_{34}	—	December 28, 2007	Kitt Peak	Spacewatch	·	1.8 km	MPC · JPL
632035	2007 YD_{35}	—	December 17, 2007	Kitt Peak	Spacewatch	URS	2.7 km	MPC · JPL
632036	2007 YX_{40}	—	December 16, 2007	Mount Lemmon	Mount Lemmon Survey	·	1.7 km	MPC · JPL
632037	2007 YA_{41}	—	December 17, 2007	Mount Lemmon	Mount Lemmon Survey	·	1.4 km	MPC · JPL
632038	2007 YR_{41}	—	December 30, 2007	Kitt Peak	Spacewatch	THM	2.7 km	MPC · JPL
632039	2007 YW_{45}	—	March 17, 2004	Kitt Peak	Spacewatch	·	1.6 km	MPC · JPL
632040	2007 YE_{48}	—	December 5, 2007	Kitt Peak	Spacewatch	·	2.1 km	MPC · JPL
632041	2007 YP_{62}	—	December 30, 2007	Kitt Peak	Spacewatch	·	3.5 km	MPC · JPL
632042	2007 YO_{72}	—	December 18, 2007	Mount Lemmon	Mount Lemmon Survey	·	1.3 km	MPC · JPL
632043	2007 YU_{72}	—	December 19, 2007	Mount Lemmon	Mount Lemmon Survey	·	2.7 km	MPC · JPL
632044	2007 YJ_{73}	—	March 9, 2003	Palomar	NEAT	·	3.5 km	MPC · JPL
632045	2007 YV_{77}	—	December 18, 2007	Mount Lemmon	Mount Lemmon Survey	VER	2.8 km	MPC · JPL
632046	2007 YD_{78}	—	February 14, 2013	Haleakala	Pan-STARRS 1	EUN	1.2 km	MPC · JPL
632047	2007 YG_{78}	—	December 3, 2013	Haleakala	Pan-STARRS 1	·	2.9 km	MPC · JPL
632048	2007 YG_{82}	—	May 4, 2009	Mount Lemmon	Mount Lemmon Survey	·	580 m	MPC · JPL
632049	2007 YJ_{82}	—	July 26, 2011	Haleakala	Pan-STARRS 1	EOS	1.7 km	MPC · JPL
632050	2007 YO_{82}	—	December 16, 2007	Kitt Peak	Spacewatch	·	2.6 km	MPC · JPL
632051	2007 YF_{83}	—	December 31, 2007	Kitt Peak	Spacewatch	EOS	1.5 km	MPC · JPL
632052	2007 YY_{84}	—	December 16, 2007	Kitt Peak	Spacewatch	·	2.8 km	MPC · JPL
632053	2007 YB_{85}	—	October 22, 2012	Mount Lemmon	Mount Lemmon Survey	·	2.3 km	MPC · JPL
632054	2007 YX_{87}	—	December 18, 2007	Mount Lemmon	Mount Lemmon Survey	·	2.2 km	MPC · JPL
632055	2007 YN_{88}	—	September 1, 2014	Mount Lemmon	Mount Lemmon Survey	·	1.1 km	MPC · JPL
632056	2007 YR_{90}	—	December 18, 2007	Mount Lemmon	Mount Lemmon Survey	·	1.2 km	MPC · JPL
632057	2007 YS_{91}	—	December 30, 2007	Kitt Peak	Spacewatch	·	2.1 km	MPC · JPL
632058	2007 YV_{93}	—	December 17, 2007	Kitt Peak	Spacewatch	·	960 m	MPC · JPL
632059	2007 YW_{93}	—	December 30, 2007	Mount Lemmon	Mount Lemmon Survey	·	960 m	MPC · JPL
632060	2007 YC_{95}	—	December 20, 2007	Kitt Peak	Spacewatch	·	1.0 km	MPC · JPL
632061	2007 YC_{96}	—	December 20, 2007	Kitt Peak	Spacewatch	·	2.5 km	MPC · JPL
632062	2007 YL_{97}	—	December 31, 2007	Kitt Peak	Spacewatch	·	1.9 km	MPC · JPL
632063	2007 YP_{98}	—	December 30, 2007	Mount Lemmon	Mount Lemmon Survey	VER	2.3 km	MPC · JPL
632064	2008 AT_{1}	—	December 16, 2007	Mount Lemmon	Mount Lemmon Survey	·	2.0 km	MPC · JPL
632065	2008 AP_{6}	—	May 18, 2001	Socorro	LINEAR	EUN	1.4 km	MPC · JPL
632066	2008 AT_{7}	—	December 5, 2007	Kitt Peak	Spacewatch	·	750 m	MPC · JPL
632067	2008 AT_{14}	—	January 10, 2008	Kitt Peak	Spacewatch	·	1.1 km	MPC · JPL
632068	2008 AP_{22}	—	January 10, 2008	Mount Lemmon	Mount Lemmon Survey	·	2.6 km	MPC · JPL
632069	2008 AU_{23}	—	January 13, 2002	Palomar	NEAT	·	3.4 km	MPC · JPL
632070	2008 AH_{27}	—	January 10, 2008	Mount Lemmon	Mount Lemmon Survey	·	3.1 km	MPC · JPL
632071	2008 AS_{31}	—	January 11, 2008	Kitt Peak	Spacewatch	H	530 m	MPC · JPL
632072	2008 AC_{38}	—	July 1, 2005	Kitt Peak	Spacewatch	·	1.8 km	MPC · JPL
632073	2008 AR_{39}	—	April 1, 2003	Apache Point	SDSS Collaboration	·	3.2 km	MPC · JPL
632074	2008 AS_{40}	—	January 10, 2008	Mount Lemmon	Mount Lemmon Survey	·	610 m	MPC · JPL
632075	2008 AP_{47}	—	January 11, 2008	Kitt Peak	Spacewatch	·	2.8 km	MPC · JPL
632076	2008 AN_{49}	—	December 31, 2007	Kitt Peak	Spacewatch	·	1.3 km	MPC · JPL
632077	2008 AO_{50}	—	January 11, 2008	Kitt Peak	Spacewatch	·	2.5 km	MPC · JPL
632078	2008 AJ_{53}	—	January 11, 2008	Kitt Peak	Spacewatch	·	2.9 km	MPC · JPL
632079	2008 AQ_{53}	—	December 14, 2007	Mount Lemmon	Mount Lemmon Survey	·	2.1 km	MPC · JPL
632080	2008 AC_{55}	—	December 30, 2007	Kitt Peak	Spacewatch	·	970 m	MPC · JPL
632081	2008 AP_{60}	—	January 11, 2008	Kitt Peak	Spacewatch	·	1.1 km	MPC · JPL
632082	2008 AR_{61}	—	November 1, 2006	Mount Lemmon	Mount Lemmon Survey	·	1.9 km	MPC · JPL
632083	2008 AK_{63}	—	October 2, 2006	Mount Lemmon	Mount Lemmon Survey	·	2.5 km	MPC · JPL
632084	2008 AA_{68}	—	January 11, 2008	Kitt Peak	Spacewatch	·	1.2 km	MPC · JPL
632085	2008 AS_{69}	—	December 30, 2007	Kitt Peak	Spacewatch	·	3.3 km	MPC · JPL
632086	2008 AL_{70}	—	September 14, 2006	Kitt Peak	Spacewatch	·	2.8 km	MPC · JPL
632087	2008 AV_{73}	—	January 10, 2008	Mount Lemmon	Mount Lemmon Survey	3:2	6.5 km	MPC · JPL
632088	2008 AA_{88}	—	December 6, 2007	Kitt Peak	Spacewatch	EOS	2.1 km	MPC · JPL
632089	2008 AE_{91}	—	January 13, 2008	Kitt Peak	Spacewatch	AGN	950 m	MPC · JPL
632090	2008 AV_{92}	—	January 14, 2008	Kitt Peak	Spacewatch	·	2.9 km	MPC · JPL
632091	2008 AF_{93}	—	January 1, 2008	Kitt Peak	Spacewatch	·	1.4 km	MPC · JPL
632092	2008 AA_{99}	—	March 17, 2005	Mount Lemmon	Mount Lemmon Survey	·	660 m	MPC · JPL
632093	2008 AU_{100}	—	January 14, 2008	Kitt Peak	Spacewatch	EUP	3.2 km	MPC · JPL
632094	2008 AZ_{100}	—	January 14, 2008	Kitt Peak	Spacewatch	·	3.6 km	MPC · JPL
632095	2008 AM_{106}	—	November 11, 2007	Mount Lemmon	Mount Lemmon Survey	·	4.2 km	MPC · JPL
632096	2008 AD_{108}	—	December 16, 2007	Kitt Peak	Spacewatch	EOS	2.1 km	MPC · JPL
632097	2008 AK_{109}	—	December 31, 2007	Kitt Peak	Spacewatch	MAR	860 m	MPC · JPL
632098	2008 AL_{109}	—	January 15, 2008	Kitt Peak	Spacewatch	·	2.2 km	MPC · JPL
632099	2008 AW_{118}	—	January 6, 2008	Mauna Kea	P. A. Wiegert	·	1.9 km	MPC · JPL
632100	2008 AN_{119}	—	January 6, 2008	Mauna Kea	P. A. Wiegert	THM	2.1 km	MPC · JPL

== 632101–632200 ==
back to top

Designation			Discovery			Properties		Ref
Permanent	Provisional	Named after	Date	Site	Discoverer(s)	Category	Diam.	Ref
632101	2008 AO_{122}	—	January 18, 2008	Kitt Peak	Spacewatch	MAR	940 m	MPC · JPL
632102	2008 AU_{131}	—	January 11, 2008	Kitt Peak	Spacewatch	·	710 m	MPC · JPL
632103	2008 AZ_{135}	—	January 11, 2008	Kitt Peak	Spacewatch	·	770 m	MPC · JPL
632104	2008 AG_{140}	—	January 11, 2008	Mount Lemmon	Mount Lemmon Survey	·	3.2 km	MPC · JPL
632105	2008 AJ_{140}	—	April 16, 2013	Haleakala	Pan-STARRS 1	·	1.5 km	MPC · JPL
632106	2008 AM_{140}	—	October 21, 2012	Mount Lemmon	Mount Lemmon Survey	·	2.4 km	MPC · JPL
632107	2008 AV_{140}	—	November 1, 2010	Mount Lemmon	Mount Lemmon Survey	·	510 m	MPC · JPL
632108	2008 AD_{141}	—	April 2, 2014	Mount Lemmon	Mount Lemmon Survey	·	1.9 km	MPC · JPL
632109	2008 AN_{142}	—	April 15, 2015	Haleakala	Pan-STARRS 1	·	2.2 km	MPC · JPL
632110	2008 AK_{144}	—	January 2, 2017	Haleakala	Pan-STARRS 1	·	1.1 km	MPC · JPL
632111	2008 AT_{144}	—	January 11, 2008	Mount Lemmon	Mount Lemmon Survey	·	2.5 km	MPC · JPL
632112	2008 AW_{146}	—	January 12, 2008	Kitt Peak	Spacewatch	·	1.8 km	MPC · JPL
632113	2008 AL_{150}	—	January 13, 2008	Kitt Peak	Spacewatch	·	1.1 km	MPC · JPL
632114	2008 AP_{151}	—	January 1, 2008	Kitt Peak	Spacewatch	·	970 m	MPC · JPL
632115	2008 AS_{152}	—	January 1, 2008	Mount Lemmon	Mount Lemmon Survey	·	1.0 km	MPC · JPL
632116	2008 BX	—	January 16, 2008	Mount Lemmon	Mount Lemmon Survey	VER	2.5 km	MPC · JPL
632117	2008 BX_{1}	—	December 14, 2007	Mount Lemmon	Mount Lemmon Survey	·	1.6 km	MPC · JPL
632118	2008 BL_{3}	—	November 8, 2007	Mount Lemmon	Mount Lemmon Survey	·	4.1 km	MPC · JPL
632119	2008 BP_{7}	—	January 16, 2008	Kitt Peak	Spacewatch	·	610 m	MPC · JPL
632120	2008 BT_{7}	—	January 16, 2008	Kitt Peak	Spacewatch	·	1.2 km	MPC · JPL
632121	2008 BL_{8}	—	January 16, 2008	Kitt Peak	Spacewatch	·	3.2 km	MPC · JPL
632122	2008 BJ_{13}	—	January 19, 2008	Mount Lemmon	Mount Lemmon Survey	·	3.0 km	MPC · JPL
632123	2008 BN_{13}	—	January 19, 2008	Mount Lemmon	Mount Lemmon Survey	LUT	3.8 km	MPC · JPL
632124	2008 BA_{14}	—	January 11, 2008	Catalina	CSS	EUP	3.3 km	MPC · JPL
632125	2008 BX_{16}	—	January 29, 2008	Junk Bond	D. Healy	·	860 m	MPC · JPL
632126	2008 BZ_{26}	—	January 30, 2008	Mount Lemmon	Mount Lemmon Survey	·	2.3 km	MPC · JPL
632127	2008 BO_{27}	—	January 11, 2008	Kitt Peak	Spacewatch	·	1.1 km	MPC · JPL
632128	2008 BK_{29}	—	October 21, 2006	Mount Lemmon	Mount Lemmon Survey	·	2.0 km	MPC · JPL
632129	2008 BN_{48}	—	January 20, 2008	Mount Lemmon	Mount Lemmon Survey	·	1.5 km	MPC · JPL
632130	2008 BD_{52}	—	January 19, 2008	Mount Lemmon	Mount Lemmon Survey	·	3.6 km	MPC · JPL
632131	2008 BQ_{55}	—	January 30, 2008	Mount Lemmon	Mount Lemmon Survey	·	2.5 km	MPC · JPL
632132	2008 BR_{56}	—	September 26, 2011	Mount Lemmon	Mount Lemmon Survey	·	2.0 km	MPC · JPL
632133	2008 BT_{58}	—	March 14, 2015	Haleakala	Pan-STARRS 1	·	620 m	MPC · JPL
632134	2008 BE_{59}	—	January 31, 2008	Kitt Peak	Spacewatch	·	1.0 km	MPC · JPL
632135	2008 BE_{60}	—	January 30, 2008	Mount Lemmon	Mount Lemmon Survey	·	2.4 km	MPC · JPL
632136	2008 BE_{61}	—	January 18, 2008	Mount Lemmon	Mount Lemmon Survey	·	1.1 km	MPC · JPL
632137	2008 BQ_{62}	—	January 30, 2008	Mount Lemmon	Mount Lemmon Survey	·	2.2 km	MPC · JPL
632138	2008 CB_{4}	—	November 19, 2007	Mount Lemmon	Mount Lemmon Survey	·	640 m	MPC · JPL
632139	2008 CT_{7}	—	February 2, 2008	Mount Lemmon	Mount Lemmon Survey	·	660 m	MPC · JPL
632140	2008 CZ_{9}	—	December 31, 2007	Mount Lemmon	Mount Lemmon Survey	·	2.2 km	MPC · JPL
632141	2008 CX_{25}	—	December 6, 2007	Kitt Peak	Spacewatch	·	1.2 km	MPC · JPL
632142	2008 CT_{26}	—	January 13, 2008	Kitt Peak	Spacewatch	ADE	1.8 km	MPC · JPL
632143	2008 CG_{29}	—	February 2, 2008	Kitt Peak	Spacewatch	·	690 m	MPC · JPL
632144	2008 CT_{32}	—	February 2, 2008	Kitt Peak	Spacewatch	·	1.2 km	MPC · JPL
632145	2008 CC_{35}	—	February 2, 2008	Kitt Peak	Spacewatch	HNS	900 m	MPC · JPL
632146	2008 CN_{46}	—	February 2, 2008	Kitt Peak	Spacewatch	·	1.7 km	MPC · JPL
632147	2008 CA_{52}	—	September 19, 2006	Kitt Peak	Spacewatch	KOR	1.4 km	MPC · JPL
632148	2008 CO_{53}	—	November 11, 2007	Mount Lemmon	Mount Lemmon Survey	·	3.2 km	MPC · JPL
632149	2008 CK_{56}	—	February 7, 2008	Mount Lemmon	Mount Lemmon Survey	·	2.5 km	MPC · JPL
632150	2008 CA_{57}	—	February 7, 2008	Mount Lemmon	Mount Lemmon Survey	·	830 m	MPC · JPL
632151	2008 CE_{58}	—	February 7, 2008	Mount Lemmon	Mount Lemmon Survey	·	2.3 km	MPC · JPL
632152	2008 CQ_{60}	—	February 7, 2008	Mount Lemmon	Mount Lemmon Survey	·	1.4 km	MPC · JPL
632153	2008 CV_{61}	—	October 22, 2001	Palomar	NEAT	BRA	1.7 km	MPC · JPL
632154	2008 CG_{64}	—	February 8, 2008	Mount Lemmon	Mount Lemmon Survey	·	1.4 km	MPC · JPL
632155	2008 CT_{70}	—	November 11, 2007	Mount Lemmon	Mount Lemmon Survey	·	1.2 km	MPC · JPL
632156	2008 CR_{75}	—	January 10, 2008	Mount Lemmon	Mount Lemmon Survey	VER	2.3 km	MPC · JPL
632157	2008 CS_{87}	—	December 1, 2006	Mount Lemmon	Mount Lemmon Survey	AGN	1.3 km	MPC · JPL
632158	2008 CG_{95}	—	February 8, 2008	Mount Lemmon	Mount Lemmon Survey	·	3.6 km	MPC · JPL
632159	2008 CG_{97}	—	February 9, 2008	Kitt Peak	Spacewatch	·	1.2 km	MPC · JPL
632160	2008 CG_{98}	—	March 18, 2004	Kitt Peak	Spacewatch	·	1.1 km	MPC · JPL
632161	2008 CE_{101}	—	January 19, 2008	Mount Lemmon	Mount Lemmon Survey	·	2.1 km	MPC · JPL
632162	2008 CS_{101}	—	October 19, 2006	Mount Lemmon	Mount Lemmon Survey	·	1.8 km	MPC · JPL
632163	2008 CS_{106}	—	February 9, 2008	Mount Lemmon	Mount Lemmon Survey	·	2.1 km	MPC · JPL
632164	2008 CW_{106}	—	February 9, 2008	Mount Lemmon	Mount Lemmon Survey	·	1.3 km	MPC · JPL
632165	2008 CS_{107}	—	December 17, 2007	Mount Lemmon	Mount Lemmon Survey	RAF	850 m	MPC · JPL
632166	2008 CF_{109}	—	February 9, 2008	Kitt Peak	Spacewatch	·	1.0 km	MPC · JPL
632167	2008 CW_{112}	—	February 10, 2008	Kitt Peak	Spacewatch	·	2.8 km	MPC · JPL
632168	2008 CF_{113}	—	September 27, 2006	Kitt Peak	Spacewatch	(5)	1.1 km	MPC · JPL
632169	2008 CU_{118}	—	August 17, 2001	Palomar	NEAT	·	2.6 km	MPC · JPL
632170	2008 CV_{118}	—	December 23, 2001	Kitt Peak	Spacewatch	·	3.0 km	MPC · JPL
632171	2008 CV_{121}	—	February 7, 2008	Catalina	CSS	·	1.1 km	MPC · JPL
632172	2008 CX_{121}	—	October 3, 2006	Mount Lemmon	Mount Lemmon Survey	·	1.5 km	MPC · JPL
632173	2008 CZ_{123}	—	February 7, 2008	Mount Lemmon	Mount Lemmon Survey	NYS	1.2 km	MPC · JPL
632174	2008 CM_{124}	—	February 7, 2008	Mount Lemmon	Mount Lemmon Survey	·	3.2 km	MPC · JPL
632175	2008 CU_{128}	—	September 19, 2006	Anderson Mesa	LONEOS	·	740 m	MPC · JPL
632176	2008 CF_{129}	—	September 24, 2000	Anderson Mesa	LONEOS	·	3.0 km	MPC · JPL
632177	2008 CN_{135}	—	February 8, 2008	Mount Lemmon	Mount Lemmon Survey	·	1.4 km	MPC · JPL
632178	2008 CU_{136}	—	February 8, 2008	Mount Lemmon	Mount Lemmon Survey	·	1.3 km	MPC · JPL
632179	2008 CV_{152}	—	November 22, 2000	Kitt Peak	Spacewatch	·	710 m	MPC · JPL
632180	2008 CU_{156}	—	November 23, 2006	Mount Lemmon	Mount Lemmon Survey	·	1.6 km	MPC · JPL
632181	2008 CH_{157}	—	February 9, 2008	Kitt Peak	Spacewatch	·	1.4 km	MPC · JPL
632182	2008 CV_{157}	—	August 29, 2006	Kitt Peak	Spacewatch	·	960 m	MPC · JPL
632183	2008 CJ_{159}	—	November 19, 2003	Kitt Peak	Spacewatch	·	600 m	MPC · JPL
632184	2008 CK_{164}	—	July 30, 2005	Palomar	NEAT	·	1.7 km	MPC · JPL
632185	2008 CM_{164}	—	February 10, 2008	Kitt Peak	Spacewatch	·	2.5 km	MPC · JPL
632186	2008 CA_{168}	—	October 16, 2006	Kitt Peak	Spacewatch	·	2.0 km	MPC · JPL
632187	2008 CA_{169}	—	September 14, 2005	Kitt Peak	Spacewatch	·	3.3 km	MPC · JPL
632188	2008 CA_{171}	—	February 12, 2008	Mount Lemmon	Mount Lemmon Survey	·	2.4 km	MPC · JPL
632189	2008 CB_{171}	—	November 11, 2007	Mount Lemmon	Mount Lemmon Survey	·	2.6 km	MPC · JPL
632190	2008 CG_{172}	—	February 2, 2008	Mount Lemmon	Mount Lemmon Survey	·	2.5 km	MPC · JPL
632191	2008 CE_{173}	—	February 13, 2008	Kitt Peak	Spacewatch	·	760 m	MPC · JPL
632192	2008 CF_{173}	—	February 13, 2008	Kitt Peak	Spacewatch	VER	2.2 km	MPC · JPL
632193	2008 CN_{176}	—	September 18, 2006	Kitt Peak	Spacewatch	·	910 m	MPC · JPL
632194	2008 CT_{179}	—	November 18, 2007	Mount Lemmon	Mount Lemmon Survey	·	1.9 km	MPC · JPL
632195	2008 CP_{189}	—	February 14, 2008	Catalina	CSS	·	1.4 km	MPC · JPL
632196	2008 CB_{219}	—	February 2, 2008	Mount Lemmon	Mount Lemmon Survey	·	1.0 km	MPC · JPL
632197	2008 CV_{219}	—	April 27, 2012	Haleakala	Pan-STARRS 1	·	770 m	MPC · JPL
632198	2008 CC_{220}	—	August 24, 2011	Haleakala	Pan-STARRS 1	·	2.7 km	MPC · JPL
632199	2008 CL_{220}	—	February 7, 2008	Kitt Peak	Spacewatch	VER	2.3 km	MPC · JPL
632200	2008 CU_{220}	—	November 19, 2015	Mount Lemmon	Mount Lemmon Survey	·	1.5 km	MPC · JPL

== 632201–632300 ==
back to top

Designation			Discovery			Properties		Ref
Permanent	Provisional	Named after	Date	Site	Discoverer(s)	Category	Diam.	Ref
632201	2008 CA_{221}	—	July 28, 2014	Haleakala	Pan-STARRS 1	HNS	970 m	MPC · JPL
632202	2008 CK_{221}	—	February 9, 2008	Kitt Peak	Spacewatch	PAD	1.4 km	MPC · JPL
632203	2008 CZ_{221}	—	January 4, 2014	Haleakala	Pan-STARRS 1	·	3.5 km	MPC · JPL
632204	2008 CJ_{222}	—	February 13, 2008	Mount Lemmon	Mount Lemmon Survey	·	650 m	MPC · JPL
632205	2008 CL_{222}	—	November 8, 2007	Kitt Peak	Spacewatch	·	3.0 km	MPC · JPL
632206	2008 CY_{222}	—	January 17, 2008	Kitt Peak	Spacewatch	URS	2.7 km	MPC · JPL
632207	2008 CB_{223}	—	February 10, 2008	Mount Lemmon	Mount Lemmon Survey	·	670 m	MPC · JPL
632208	2008 CD_{224}	—	February 10, 2008	Kitt Peak	Spacewatch	·	1.4 km	MPC · JPL
632209	2008 CL_{225}	—	February 7, 2008	Mount Lemmon	Mount Lemmon Survey	·	1.0 km	MPC · JPL
632210	2008 CF_{226}	—	December 31, 2011	Mount Lemmon	Mount Lemmon Survey	·	1.5 km	MPC · JPL
632211	2008 CM_{228}	—	November 6, 2015	ESA OGS	ESA OGS	·	1.7 km	MPC · JPL
632212	2008 CB_{229}	—	January 26, 2012	Mount Lemmon	Mount Lemmon Survey	·	1.3 km	MPC · JPL
632213	2008 CG_{229}	—	February 9, 2008	Catalina	CSS	EUN	1.3 km	MPC · JPL
632214	2008 CQ_{229}	—	February 13, 2008	Mount Lemmon	Mount Lemmon Survey	·	2.7 km	MPC · JPL
632215	2008 CM_{231}	—	February 12, 2008	Mount Lemmon	Mount Lemmon Survey	·	1.6 km	MPC · JPL
632216	2008 CY_{236}	—	August 20, 2014	Haleakala	Pan-STARRS 1	·	930 m	MPC · JPL
632217	2008 CG_{237}	—	June 8, 2016	Haleakala	Pan-STARRS 1	·	2.6 km	MPC · JPL
632218	2008 CC_{238}	—	February 9, 2008	Mount Lemmon	Mount Lemmon Survey	L5	8.8 km	MPC · JPL
632219	2008 CY_{240}	—	February 10, 2008	Kitt Peak	Spacewatch	·	1.1 km	MPC · JPL
632220	2008 CB_{244}	—	February 10, 2008	Mount Lemmon	Mount Lemmon Survey	·	1.6 km	MPC · JPL
632221	2008 CX_{244}	—	February 2, 2008	Mount Lemmon	Mount Lemmon Survey	·	2.6 km	MPC · JPL
632222	2008 CZ_{244}	—	February 12, 2008	Mount Lemmon	Mount Lemmon Survey	·	2.6 km	MPC · JPL
632223	2008 DR_{8}	—	February 25, 2008	Mount Lemmon	Mount Lemmon Survey	·	2.9 km	MPC · JPL
632224	2008 DW_{12}	—	January 11, 2008	Mount Lemmon	Mount Lemmon Survey	·	2.9 km	MPC · JPL
632225	2008 DJ_{13}	—	February 26, 2008	Kitt Peak	Spacewatch	·	2.5 km	MPC · JPL
632226	2008 DZ_{16}	—	November 20, 2007	Mount Lemmon	Mount Lemmon Survey	·	1.9 km	MPC · JPL
632227	2008 DW_{20}	—	September 12, 2002	Palomar	NEAT	·	1.4 km	MPC · JPL
632228	2008 DH_{22}	—	February 8, 2008	Mount Lemmon	Mount Lemmon Survey	·	1.6 km	MPC · JPL
632229	2008 DU_{28}	—	February 26, 2008	Kitt Peak	Spacewatch	·	2.2 km	MPC · JPL
632230	2008 DQ_{29}	—	October 23, 1998	Kitt Peak	Spacewatch	·	1.0 km	MPC · JPL
632231	2008 DX_{29}	—	February 26, 2008	Mount Lemmon	Mount Lemmon Survey	·	620 m	MPC · JPL
632232	2008 DP_{30}	—	January 12, 2008	Kitt Peak	Spacewatch	·	3.4 km	MPC · JPL
632233	2008 DJ_{32}	—	February 2, 2008	Mount Lemmon	Mount Lemmon Survey	·	3.2 km	MPC · JPL
632234	2008 DH_{35}	—	September 28, 2006	Kitt Peak	Spacewatch	·	1.1 km	MPC · JPL
632235	2008 DJ_{39}	—	August 29, 2006	Kitt Peak	Spacewatch	·	770 m	MPC · JPL
632236	2008 DR_{40}	—	February 27, 2008	Kitt Peak	Spacewatch	·	1.6 km	MPC · JPL
632237	2008 DV_{49}	—	November 19, 2006	Kitt Peak	Spacewatch	·	2.9 km	MPC · JPL
632238	2008 DJ_{50}	—	February 29, 2008	Mount Lemmon	Mount Lemmon Survey	·	3.6 km	MPC · JPL
632239	2008 DT_{51}	—	January 19, 2008	Mount Lemmon	Mount Lemmon Survey	EUN	1.1 km	MPC · JPL
632240	2008 DD_{58}	—	November 12, 2001	Apache Point	SDSS Collaboration	·	2.6 km	MPC · JPL
632241	2008 DL_{64}	—	February 13, 2008	Kitt Peak	Spacewatch	·	1.3 km	MPC · JPL
632242	2008 DE_{71}	—	February 29, 2008	Catalina	CSS	·	4.1 km	MPC · JPL
632243	2008 DF_{90}	—	February 28, 2008	Kitt Peak	Spacewatch	·	1.9 km	MPC · JPL
632244	2008 DZ_{90}	—	February 18, 2008	Mount Lemmon	Mount Lemmon Survey	·	750 m	MPC · JPL
632245	2008 DA_{96}	—	February 28, 2008	Mount Lemmon	Mount Lemmon Survey	·	1.3 km	MPC · JPL
632246	2008 DF_{96}	—	February 28, 2008	Mount Lemmon	Mount Lemmon Survey	·	1.2 km	MPC · JPL
632247	2008 DX_{97}	—	February 28, 2008	Kitt Peak	Spacewatch	·	1.3 km	MPC · JPL
632248	2008 EZ_{3}	—	March 1, 2008	Mount Lemmon	Mount Lemmon Survey	·	1.5 km	MPC · JPL
632249	2008 EU_{10}	—	March 1, 2008	Kitt Peak	Spacewatch	·	1.5 km	MPC · JPL
632250	2008 EZ_{19}	—	March 2, 2008	Kitt Peak	Spacewatch	·	1.3 km	MPC · JPL
632251	2008 EN_{24}	—	March 3, 2008	Mount Lemmon	Mount Lemmon Survey	·	1.7 km	MPC · JPL
632252	2008 EW_{24}	—	March 3, 2008	Mount Lemmon	Mount Lemmon Survey	·	2.6 km	MPC · JPL
632253	2008 EA_{25}	—	March 3, 2008	Mount Lemmon	Mount Lemmon Survey	RAF	960 m	MPC · JPL
632254	2008 EL_{30}	—	February 24, 2008	Kitt Peak	Spacewatch	NYS	1.1 km	MPC · JPL
632255	2008 EY_{30}	—	March 5, 2008	Mount Lemmon	Mount Lemmon Survey	·	1.4 km	MPC · JPL
632256	2008 EP_{31}	—	October 27, 2006	Mount Lemmon	Mount Lemmon Survey	·	1.2 km	MPC · JPL
632257	2008 ED_{33}	—	March 1, 2008	Kitt Peak	Spacewatch	·	1.5 km	MPC · JPL
632258	2008 EK_{37}	—	November 19, 2007	Mount Lemmon	Mount Lemmon Survey	·	2.7 km	MPC · JPL
632259	2008 ET_{37}	—	February 7, 2008	Kitt Peak	Spacewatch	·	2.0 km	MPC · JPL
632260	2008 EJ_{41}	—	December 12, 2006	Kitt Peak	Spacewatch	·	1.8 km	MPC · JPL
632261	2008 EN_{45}	—	March 5, 2008	Mount Lemmon	Mount Lemmon Survey	·	1.7 km	MPC · JPL
632262	2008 EO_{53}	—	March 6, 2008	Mount Lemmon	Mount Lemmon Survey	·	600 m	MPC · JPL
632263	2008 EU_{53}	—	March 6, 2008	Mount Lemmon	Mount Lemmon Survey	·	4.1 km	MPC · JPL
632264	2008 EJ_{54}	—	October 3, 2006	Mount Lemmon	Mount Lemmon Survey	·	1.1 km	MPC · JPL
632265	2008 EG_{55}	—	March 6, 2008	Mount Lemmon	Mount Lemmon Survey	·	2.4 km	MPC · JPL
632266	2008 EW_{58}	—	January 11, 2008	Lulin	LUSS	·	1.4 km	MPC · JPL
632267	2008 EJ_{59}	—	March 8, 2008	Mount Lemmon	Mount Lemmon Survey	·	1.8 km	MPC · JPL
632268	2008 EP_{60}	—	March 8, 2008	Mount Lemmon	Mount Lemmon Survey	·	1.4 km	MPC · JPL
632269	2008 EG_{63}	—	November 19, 2003	Kitt Peak	Spacewatch	·	750 m	MPC · JPL
632270	2008 EV_{63}	—	March 9, 2008	Kitt Peak	Spacewatch	·	3.9 km	MPC · JPL
632271	2008 ES_{66}	—	March 9, 2008	Mount Lemmon	Mount Lemmon Survey	NEM	1.6 km	MPC · JPL
632272	2008 EV_{66}	—	March 9, 2008	Mount Lemmon	Mount Lemmon Survey	·	1.2 km	MPC · JPL
632273	2008 EN_{71}	—	November 1, 2006	Mount Lemmon	Mount Lemmon Survey	·	1.2 km	MPC · JPL
632274	2008 ER_{72}	—	March 6, 2008	Mount Lemmon	Mount Lemmon Survey	·	580 m	MPC · JPL
632275	2008 EF_{75}	—	April 20, 2004	Kitt Peak	Spacewatch	·	1.5 km	MPC · JPL
632276	2008 ES_{78}	—	October 11, 2006	Palomar	NEAT	·	1.5 km	MPC · JPL
632277	2008 EM_{80}	—	February 12, 2008	Mount Lemmon	Mount Lemmon Survey	·	820 m	MPC · JPL
632278	2008 EM_{81}	—	April 26, 2004	Kitt Peak	Spacewatch	·	2.0 km	MPC · JPL
632279	2008 EF_{84}	—	March 12, 2008	Kitt Peak	Spacewatch	·	1.6 km	MPC · JPL
632280	2008 EU_{89}	—	March 1, 2008	Kitt Peak	Spacewatch	(2076)	860 m	MPC · JPL
632281	2008 EZ_{91}	—	March 3, 2008	Catalina	CSS	V	720 m	MPC · JPL
632282	2008 EB_{94}	—	March 4, 2008	Catalina	CSS	V	700 m	MPC · JPL
632283	2008 EQ_{95}	—	September 28, 2006	Kitt Peak	Spacewatch	·	1.2 km	MPC · JPL
632284	2008 EQ_{96}	—	February 8, 2008	Kitt Peak	Spacewatch	·	970 m	MPC · JPL
632285	2008 EG_{97}	—	March 8, 2008	Mount Lemmon	Mount Lemmon Survey	NEM	2.0 km	MPC · JPL
632286	2008 EY_{98}	—	November 20, 2003	Kitt Peak	Spacewatch	V	700 m	MPC · JPL
632287	2008 EY_{100}	—	March 7, 2008	Nyukasa	Nyukasa	·	1.4 km	MPC · JPL
632288	2008 ES_{101}	—	February 2, 2008	Kitt Peak	Spacewatch	·	710 m	MPC · JPL
632289	2008 EB_{104}	—	January 30, 2004	Kitt Peak	Spacewatch	MAS	860 m	MPC · JPL
632290	2008 EM_{106}	—	March 6, 2008	Mount Lemmon	Mount Lemmon Survey	·	1.4 km	MPC · JPL
632291	2008 EK_{110}	—	September 21, 2003	Kitt Peak	Spacewatch	·	620 m	MPC · JPL
632292	2008 EB_{115}	—	March 8, 2008	Kitt Peak	Spacewatch	·	720 m	MPC · JPL
632293	2008 EQ_{115}	—	March 8, 2008	Mount Lemmon	Mount Lemmon Survey	·	1.3 km	MPC · JPL
632294	2008 EN_{129}	—	February 29, 2008	Kitt Peak	Spacewatch	·	1.6 km	MPC · JPL
632295	2008 EZ_{130}	—	March 11, 2008	Kitt Peak	Spacewatch	·	1.7 km	MPC · JPL
632296	2008 EE_{131}	—	February 12, 2008	Mount Lemmon	Mount Lemmon Survey	·	690 m	MPC · JPL
632297	2008 EX_{143}	—	September 28, 2006	Kitt Peak	Spacewatch	·	770 m	MPC · JPL
632298	2008 EA_{144}	—	March 8, 2008	Mount Lemmon	Mount Lemmon Survey	·	2.5 km	MPC · JPL
632299	2008 EQ_{144}	—	March 15, 2008	Kitt Peak	Spacewatch	·	1.6 km	MPC · JPL
632300	2008 EZ_{149}	—	March 6, 2008	Kitt Peak	Spacewatch	EUN	970 m	MPC · JPL

== 632301–632400 ==
back to top

Designation			Discovery			Properties		Ref
Permanent	Provisional	Named after	Date	Site	Discoverer(s)	Category	Diam.	Ref
632301	2008 EP_{159}	—	September 4, 2011	Haleakala	Pan-STARRS 1	·	2.7 km	MPC · JPL
632302	2008 EE_{161}	—	March 6, 2008	Kitt Peak	Spacewatch	·	1.4 km	MPC · JPL
632303	2008 EQ_{170}	—	January 10, 2008	Kitt Peak	Spacewatch	·	1.8 km	MPC · JPL
632304	2008 EF_{172}	—	March 6, 2008	Mount Lemmon	Mount Lemmon Survey	T_{j} (2.98)	3.7 km	MPC · JPL
632305	2008 EN_{172}	—	March 10, 2008	Kitt Peak	Spacewatch	·	690 m	MPC · JPL
632306	2008 EC_{173}	—	September 12, 2013	Catalina	CSS	·	830 m	MPC · JPL
632307	2008 EH_{173}	—	September 25, 2011	Haleakala	Pan-STARRS 1	·	3.2 km	MPC · JPL
632308	2008 ER_{173}	—	December 3, 2012	Mount Lemmon	Mount Lemmon Survey	·	2.9 km	MPC · JPL
632309	2008 EE_{174}	—	November 28, 2013	Mount Lemmon	Mount Lemmon Survey	·	610 m	MPC · JPL
632310	2008 EN_{174}	—	May 15, 2013	Haleakala	Pan-STARRS 1	·	1.3 km	MPC · JPL
632311	2008 EX_{174}	—	January 18, 2012	Mount Lemmon	Mount Lemmon Survey	·	2.2 km	MPC · JPL
632312	2008 EM_{175}	—	September 19, 2011	Haleakala	Pan-STARRS 1	·	2.4 km	MPC · JPL
632313	2008 EQ_{175}	—	March 1, 2008	Kitt Peak	Spacewatch	·	1.4 km	MPC · JPL
632314	2008 EZ_{176}	—	April 16, 2013	Haleakala	Pan-STARRS 1	·	1.4 km	MPC · JPL
632315	2008 EF_{179}	—	April 16, 2013	Cerro Tololo-DECam	DECam	·	1.1 km	MPC · JPL
632316	2008 EK_{181}	—	May 8, 2013	Haleakala	Pan-STARRS 1	·	1.5 km	MPC · JPL
632317	2008 ET_{181}	—	March 4, 2008	Catalina	CSS	·	1.4 km	MPC · JPL
632318	2008 EE_{188}	—	March 12, 2008	Kitt Peak	Spacewatch	·	1.3 km	MPC · JPL
632319	2008 EY_{189}	—	March 2, 2008	Mount Lemmon	Mount Lemmon Survey	·	1.0 km	MPC · JPL
632320	2008 EB_{190}	—	March 11, 2008	Kitt Peak	Spacewatch	·	1.1 km	MPC · JPL
632321	2008 EJ_{190}	—	March 11, 2008	Kitt Peak	Spacewatch	·	1.4 km	MPC · JPL
632322	2008 EM_{191}	—	March 2, 2008	Kitt Peak	Spacewatch	·	1.4 km	MPC · JPL
632323	2008 EF_{192}	—	March 12, 2008	Mount Lemmon	Mount Lemmon Survey	·	970 m	MPC · JPL
632324	2008 EH_{197}	—	March 15, 2008	Mount Lemmon	Mount Lemmon Survey	·	450 m	MPC · JPL
632325	2008 EK_{197}	—	March 5, 2008	Mount Lemmon	Mount Lemmon Survey	·	1.1 km	MPC · JPL
632326	2008 FV_{1}	—	July 8, 2005	Kitt Peak	Spacewatch	·	2.0 km	MPC · JPL
632327	2008 FZ_{5}	—	May 19, 2005	Mount Lemmon	Mount Lemmon Survey	·	1.3 km	MPC · JPL
632328	2008 FB_{6}	—	March 28, 2008	Vail-Jarnac	Jarnac	·	1.9 km	MPC · JPL
632329	2008 FX_{7}	—	March 25, 2008	Kitt Peak	Spacewatch	·	1.8 km	MPC · JPL
632330	2008 FA_{9}	—	February 26, 2008	Mount Lemmon	Mount Lemmon Survey	·	650 m	MPC · JPL
632331	2008 FM_{9}	—	January 30, 2008	Mount Lemmon	Mount Lemmon Survey	KOR	1.6 km	MPC · JPL
632332	2008 FC_{14}	—	March 10, 2008	Kitt Peak	Spacewatch	·	1.1 km	MPC · JPL
632333	2008 FC_{20}	—	March 27, 2008	Mount Lemmon	Mount Lemmon Survey	·	1.2 km	MPC · JPL
632334	2008 FH_{21}	—	March 5, 2008	Kitt Peak	Spacewatch	·	1.4 km	MPC · JPL
632335	2008 FS_{21}	—	December 17, 2006	7300	W. K. Y. Yeung	·	1.8 km	MPC · JPL
632336	2008 FP_{30}	—	October 13, 1999	Apache Point	SDSS	HYG	3.3 km	MPC · JPL
632337	2008 FT_{35}	—	March 28, 2008	Mount Lemmon	Mount Lemmon Survey	·	1.1 km	MPC · JPL
632338	2008 FR_{36}	—	February 28, 2008	Kitt Peak	Spacewatch	·	940 m	MPC · JPL
632339	2008 FZ_{38}	—	March 28, 2008	Kitt Peak	Spacewatch	·	1.6 km	MPC · JPL
632340	2008 FK_{40}	—	March 4, 2008	Mount Lemmon	Mount Lemmon Survey	L5	7.2 km	MPC · JPL
632341	2008 FA_{46}	—	February 14, 1999	Kitt Peak	Spacewatch	·	2.1 km	MPC · JPL
632342	2008 FO_{46}	—	March 28, 2008	Mount Lemmon	Mount Lemmon Survey	·	730 m	MPC · JPL
632343	2008 FX_{51}	—	March 8, 2008	Kitt Peak	Spacewatch	V	520 m	MPC · JPL
632344	2008 FE_{62}	—	September 17, 2006	Kitt Peak	Spacewatch	(5)	1.2 km	MPC · JPL
632345	2008 FS_{64}	—	November 14, 2006	Kitt Peak	Spacewatch	·	740 m	MPC · JPL
632346	2008 FH_{73}	—	October 16, 2001	Palomar	NEAT	·	1.8 km	MPC · JPL
632347	2008 FL_{75}	—	August 31, 2005	Kitt Peak	Spacewatch	·	900 m	MPC · JPL
632348	2008 FP_{75}	—	March 31, 2008	Mount Lemmon	Mount Lemmon Survey	V	550 m	MPC · JPL
632349	2008 FQ_{82}	—	March 7, 2008	Mount Lemmon	Mount Lemmon Survey	·	690 m	MPC · JPL
632350	2008 FV_{86}	—	January 5, 2016	Haleakala	Pan-STARRS 1	·	1.1 km	MPC · JPL
632351	2008 FU_{92}	—	February 28, 2008	Mount Lemmon	Mount Lemmon Survey	·	1.6 km	MPC · JPL
632352	2008 FX_{94}	—	March 29, 2008	Kitt Peak	Spacewatch	(13314)	1.8 km	MPC · JPL
632353	2008 FW_{95}	—	February 22, 2003	Palomar	NEAT	·	2.8 km	MPC · JPL
632354	2008 FJ_{96}	—	August 5, 2005	Palomar	NEAT	·	970 m	MPC · JPL
632355	2008 FO_{101}	—	December 16, 2006	Mount Lemmon	Mount Lemmon Survey	·	1.9 km	MPC · JPL
632356	2008 FM_{102}	—	March 30, 2008	Kitt Peak	Spacewatch	·	1.6 km	MPC · JPL
632357	2008 FJ_{107}	—	October 2, 2006	Mount Lemmon	Mount Lemmon Survey	·	660 m	MPC · JPL
632358	2008 FM_{110}	—	March 31, 2008	Mount Lemmon	Mount Lemmon Survey	·	1.3 km	MPC · JPL
632359	2008 FG_{117}	—	March 31, 2008	Kitt Peak	Spacewatch	·	2.1 km	MPC · JPL
632360	2008 FX_{119}	—	March 31, 2008	Mount Lemmon	Mount Lemmon Survey	·	650 m	MPC · JPL
632361	2008 FZ_{119}	—	March 31, 2008	Mount Lemmon	Mount Lemmon Survey	·	1.4 km	MPC · JPL
632362	2008 FW_{120}	—	March 11, 2008	Mount Lemmon	Mount Lemmon Survey	·	1.5 km	MPC · JPL
632363	2008 FK_{121}	—	October 15, 2002	Palomar	NEAT	·	1.1 km	MPC · JPL
632364	2008 FK_{130}	—	March 29, 2008	Kitt Peak	Spacewatch	·	970 m	MPC · JPL
632365	2008 FB_{133}	—	March 30, 2008	Kitt Peak	Spacewatch	L5	7.4 km	MPC · JPL
632366	2008 FU_{137}	—	March 31, 2008	Mount Lemmon	Mount Lemmon Survey	DOR	2.6 km	MPC · JPL
632367	2008 FA_{139}	—	March 30, 2008	Kitt Peak	Spacewatch	·	1.4 km	MPC · JPL
632368	2008 FF_{139}	—	September 15, 2009	Kitt Peak	Spacewatch	NYS	930 m	MPC · JPL
632369	2008 FG_{139}	—	March 31, 2008	Mount Lemmon	Mount Lemmon Survey	·	1.2 km	MPC · JPL
632370	2008 FK_{139}	—	March 29, 2008	Kitt Peak	Spacewatch	L5	7.1 km	MPC · JPL
632371	2008 FM_{139}	—	October 26, 2009	Kitt Peak	Spacewatch	·	870 m	MPC · JPL
632372	2008 FS_{139}	—	November 26, 2013	Haleakala	Pan-STARRS 1	·	720 m	MPC · JPL
632373	2008 FW_{139}	—	March 29, 2008	Catalina	CSS	JUN	1.0 km	MPC · JPL
632374	2008 FE_{142}	—	January 4, 2017	Haleakala	Pan-STARRS 1	·	1.7 km	MPC · JPL
632375	2008 FW_{142}	—	September 10, 2016	Mount Lemmon	Mount Lemmon Survey	·	710 m	MPC · JPL
632376	2008 FM_{145}	—	October 12, 2005	Kitt Peak	Spacewatch	·	1.8 km	MPC · JPL
632377	2008 FN_{145}	—	March 30, 2008	Kitt Peak	Spacewatch	L5	8.4 km	MPC · JPL
632378	2008 FL_{146}	—	March 30, 2008	Kitt Peak	Spacewatch	EOS	1.8 km	MPC · JPL
632379	2008 FV_{148}	—	March 27, 2008	Mount Lemmon	Mount Lemmon Survey	·	1.5 km	MPC · JPL
632380	2008 FS_{150}	—	March 31, 2008	Mount Lemmon	Mount Lemmon Survey	·	1.3 km	MPC · JPL
632381	2008 GU_{2}	—	April 4, 2008	Junk Bond	D. Healy	·	1.6 km	MPC · JPL
632382	2008 GW_{8}	—	April 1, 2008	Mount Lemmon	Mount Lemmon Survey	·	1.4 km	MPC · JPL
632383	2008 GC_{10}	—	April 1, 2008	Kitt Peak	Spacewatch	·	890 m	MPC · JPL
632384	2008 GQ_{14}	—	April 3, 2008	Kitt Peak	Spacewatch	L5	8.5 km	MPC · JPL
632385	2008 GM_{20}	—	April 4, 2008	Kitt Peak	Spacewatch	·	570 m	MPC · JPL
632386	2008 GC_{26}	—	April 1, 2008	Mount Lemmon	Mount Lemmon Survey	·	1.4 km	MPC · JPL
632387	2008 GE_{26}	—	April 1, 2008	Mount Lemmon	Mount Lemmon Survey	·	1.3 km	MPC · JPL
632388	2008 GH_{30}	—	March 1, 2008	Kitt Peak	Spacewatch	·	840 m	MPC · JPL
632389	2008 GG_{32}	—	April 3, 2008	Kitt Peak	Spacewatch	L5	7.8 km	MPC · JPL
632390	2008 GP_{33}	—	March 12, 2008	Kitt Peak	Spacewatch	·	2.3 km	MPC · JPL
632391	2008 GE_{35}	—	March 30, 2008	Kitt Peak	Spacewatch	DOR	2.3 km	MPC · JPL
632392	2008 GH_{35}	—	April 3, 2008	Kitt Peak	Spacewatch	·	1.8 km	MPC · JPL
632393	2008 GT_{37}	—	April 3, 2008	Kitt Peak	Spacewatch	·	1.8 km	MPC · JPL
632394	2008 GQ_{44}	—	April 4, 2008	Mount Lemmon	Mount Lemmon Survey	·	1.3 km	MPC · JPL
632395	2008 GO_{54}	—	October 1, 2005	Kitt Peak	Spacewatch	·	1.6 km	MPC · JPL
632396	2008 GK_{60}	—	February 28, 2008	Kitt Peak	Spacewatch	·	1.3 km	MPC · JPL
632397	2008 GD_{62}	—	April 5, 2008	Mount Lemmon	Mount Lemmon Survey	·	3.2 km	MPC · JPL
632398	2008 GT_{66}	—	March 29, 2008	Kitt Peak	Spacewatch	L5	9.9 km	MPC · JPL
632399	2008 GR_{72}	—	March 5, 2008	Kitt Peak	Spacewatch	·	1.5 km	MPC · JPL
632400	2008 GZ_{79}	—	March 30, 2003	Kitt Peak	Deep Ecliptic Survey	·	1.5 km	MPC · JPL

== 632401–632500 ==
back to top

Designation			Discovery			Properties		Ref
Permanent	Provisional	Named after	Date	Site	Discoverer(s)	Category	Diam.	Ref
632401	2008 GX_{84}	—	April 8, 2008	Mount Lemmon	Mount Lemmon Survey	·	1.6 km	MPC · JPL
632402	2008 GW_{86}	—	April 9, 2008	Mount Lemmon	Mount Lemmon Survey	·	1.7 km	MPC · JPL
632403	2008 GR_{88}	—	December 26, 2006	Kitt Peak	Spacewatch	HOF	2.6 km	MPC · JPL
632404	2008 GV_{91}	—	April 6, 2008	Mount Lemmon	Mount Lemmon Survey	·	1.5 km	MPC · JPL
632405	2008 GT_{94}	—	March 11, 2008	Mount Lemmon	Mount Lemmon Survey	NEM	1.9 km	MPC · JPL
632406	2008 GN_{95}	—	October 16, 2006	Catalina	CSS	(5)	1.4 km	MPC · JPL
632407	2008 GQ_{97}	—	April 8, 2008	Kitt Peak	Spacewatch	·	1.5 km	MPC · JPL
632408	2008 GG_{105}	—	November 26, 2003	Kitt Peak	Spacewatch	·	990 m	MPC · JPL
632409	2008 GM_{113}	—	December 15, 2006	Kitt Peak	Spacewatch	·	1.8 km	MPC · JPL
632410	2008 GM_{117}	—	April 3, 2008	Kitt Peak	Spacewatch	AGN	1.2 km	MPC · JPL
632411	2008 GB_{118}	—	April 11, 2008	Mount Lemmon	Mount Lemmon Survey	·	1.2 km	MPC · JPL
632412	2008 GF_{125}	—	March 30, 2008	Kitt Peak	Spacewatch	·	1.2 km	MPC · JPL
632413	2008 GK_{125}	—	April 14, 2008	Mount Lemmon	Mount Lemmon Survey	·	1.3 km	MPC · JPL
632414	2008 GC_{126}	—	March 24, 2003	Kitt Peak	Spacewatch	·	2.3 km	MPC · JPL
632415	2008 GO_{127}	—	March 23, 2003	Apache Point	SDSS Collaboration	·	1.6 km	MPC · JPL
632416	2008 GN_{132}	—	April 13, 2008	Mount Lemmon	Mount Lemmon Survey	L5	10 km	MPC · JPL
632417	2008 GR_{143}	—	April 9, 2008	Kitt Peak	Spacewatch	L5	7.8 km	MPC · JPL
632418	2008 GU_{143}	—	April 14, 2008	Mount Lemmon	Mount Lemmon Survey	L5	7.3 km	MPC · JPL
632419	2008 GY_{144}	—	February 9, 2008	Mount Lemmon	Mount Lemmon Survey	·	1.4 km	MPC · JPL
632420	2008 GK_{148}	—	March 10, 1999	Kitt Peak	Spacewatch	·	1.4 km	MPC · JPL
632421	2008 GU_{148}	—	March 11, 2008	Mount Lemmon	Mount Lemmon Survey	·	3.1 km	MPC · JPL
632422	2008 GW_{148}	—	February 13, 2008	Mount Lemmon	Mount Lemmon Survey	·	1.4 km	MPC · JPL
632423	2008 GX_{148}	—	October 1, 2005	Kitt Peak	Spacewatch	NEM	2.0 km	MPC · JPL
632424	2008 GM_{149}	—	April 14, 2008	Mount Lemmon	Mount Lemmon Survey	·	1.7 km	MPC · JPL
632425	2008 GP_{150}	—	April 5, 2008	Mount Lemmon	Mount Lemmon Survey	EUN	1.1 km	MPC · JPL
632426	2008 GC_{152}	—	September 17, 2014	Haleakala	Pan-STARRS 1	·	1.5 km	MPC · JPL
632427	2008 GX_{152}	—	April 3, 2008	Kitt Peak	Spacewatch	·	710 m	MPC · JPL
632428	2008 GL_{157}	—	August 17, 2009	La Sagra	OAM	·	2.6 km	MPC · JPL
632429	2008 GR_{157}	—	March 7, 2013	Mount Lemmon	Mount Lemmon Survey	·	1.6 km	MPC · JPL
632430	2008 GB_{158}	—	June 7, 2013	Haleakala	Pan-STARRS 1	·	1.6 km	MPC · JPL
632431	2008 GU_{158}	—	April 6, 2008	Kitt Peak	Spacewatch	·	1.4 km	MPC · JPL
632432	2008 GH_{165}	—	October 21, 2011	Kitt Peak	Spacewatch	·	3.5 km	MPC · JPL
632433	2008 GJ_{165}	—	December 2, 2010	Mount Lemmon	Mount Lemmon Survey	·	1.9 km	MPC · JPL
632434	2008 GT_{167}	—	April 15, 2008	Mount Lemmon	Mount Lemmon Survey	L5	6.8 km	MPC · JPL
632435	2008 GP_{168}	—	April 15, 2008	Mount Lemmon	Mount Lemmon Survey	·	1.0 km	MPC · JPL
632436	2008 GT_{168}	—	April 11, 2008	Mount Lemmon	Mount Lemmon Survey	L5	7.6 km	MPC · JPL
632437	2008 GN_{169}	—	April 14, 2008	Mount Lemmon	Mount Lemmon Survey	·	1.3 km	MPC · JPL
632438	2008 GB_{171}	—	April 6, 2008	Mount Lemmon	Mount Lemmon Survey	L5	6.6 km	MPC · JPL
632439	2008 GQ_{171}	—	April 6, 2008	Kitt Peak	Spacewatch	L5	7.0 km	MPC · JPL
632440	2008 GP_{175}	—	April 9, 2008	Mount Lemmon	Mount Lemmon Survey	·	1.3 km	MPC · JPL
632441	2008 GH_{178}	—	April 14, 2008	Mount Lemmon	Mount Lemmon Survey	·	1.5 km	MPC · JPL
632442	2008 GU_{178}	—	April 7, 2008	Kitt Peak	Spacewatch	·	1.5 km	MPC · JPL
632443	2008 HA	—	April 16, 2008	Mount Lemmon	Mount Lemmon Survey	T_{j} (2.92)	4.7 km	MPC · JPL
632444	2008 HH_{14}	—	April 9, 2008	Kitt Peak	Spacewatch	·	570 m	MPC · JPL
632445	2008 HZ_{14}	—	October 3, 2005	Catalina	CSS	·	2.0 km	MPC · JPL
632446	2008 HJ_{20}	—	April 11, 2008	Mount Lemmon	Mount Lemmon Survey	·	1.7 km	MPC · JPL
632447	2008 HX_{20}	—	April 26, 2008	Kitt Peak	Spacewatch	·	1.4 km	MPC · JPL
632448	2008 HC_{23}	—	March 29, 2008	Mount Lemmon	Mount Lemmon Survey	·	1.7 km	MPC · JPL
632449	2008 HE_{27}	—	October 12, 2005	Kitt Peak	Spacewatch	EOS	1.6 km	MPC · JPL
632450	2008 HB_{29}	—	September 19, 2006	Kitt Peak	Spacewatch	·	630 m	MPC · JPL
632451	2008 HW_{29}	—	April 1, 2008	Mount Lemmon	Mount Lemmon Survey	·	2.0 km	MPC · JPL
632452	2008 HX_{29}	—	January 27, 2007	Mount Lemmon	Mount Lemmon Survey	·	3.7 km	MPC · JPL
632453	2008 HD_{31}	—	March 19, 2007	Mount Lemmon	Mount Lemmon Survey	L5	9.5 km	MPC · JPL
632454	2008 HD_{44}	—	April 27, 2008	Mount Lemmon	Mount Lemmon Survey	·	1.6 km	MPC · JPL
632455	2008 HT_{45}	—	October 2, 2006	Mount Lemmon	Mount Lemmon Survey	·	680 m	MPC · JPL
632456	2008 HB_{48}	—	August 22, 2004	Kitt Peak	Spacewatch	·	2.6 km	MPC · JPL
632457	2008 HM_{49}	—	April 29, 2008	Mount Lemmon	Mount Lemmon Survey	·	780 m	MPC · JPL
632458	2008 HV_{49}	—	April 29, 2008	Kitt Peak	Spacewatch	·	1.4 km	MPC · JPL
632459	2008 HD_{52}	—	April 29, 2008	Mount Lemmon	Mount Lemmon Survey	AGN	920 m	MPC · JPL
632460	2008 HF_{56}	—	January 27, 2007	Kitt Peak	Spacewatch	3:2	4.6 km	MPC · JPL
632461	2008 HK_{56}	—	October 4, 2006	Mount Lemmon	Mount Lemmon Survey	V	690 m	MPC · JPL
632462	2008 HH_{60}	—	April 28, 2008	Mount Lemmon	Mount Lemmon Survey	·	2.4 km	MPC · JPL
632463	2008 HR_{61}	—	April 30, 2008	Mount Lemmon	Mount Lemmon Survey	·	830 m	MPC · JPL
632464	2008 HE_{71}	—	April 3, 2008	Kitt Peak	Spacewatch	·	1.9 km	MPC · JPL
632465	2008 HH_{71}	—	September 30, 2014	Kitt Peak	Spacewatch	·	1.5 km	MPC · JPL
632466	2008 HJ_{72}	—	October 13, 2013	Mount Lemmon	Mount Lemmon Survey	L5	8.3 km	MPC · JPL
632467	2008 HT_{72}	—	February 14, 2012	Haleakala	Pan-STARRS 1	·	1.5 km	MPC · JPL
632468	2008 HZ_{72}	—	April 30, 2008	Mount Lemmon	Mount Lemmon Survey	HNS	1.2 km	MPC · JPL
632469	2008 HC_{74}	—	April 28, 2008	Mount Lemmon	Mount Lemmon Survey	·	1.6 km	MPC · JPL
632470	2008 HE_{76}	—	April 28, 2008	Kitt Peak	Spacewatch	·	1.6 km	MPC · JPL
632471	2008 JX_{3}	—	April 16, 2008	Mount Lemmon	Mount Lemmon Survey	L5	10 km	MPC · JPL
632472	2008 JC_{11}	—	May 3, 2008	Kitt Peak	Spacewatch	L5	8.8 km	MPC · JPL
632473	2008 JB_{20}	—	May 2, 2008	Kitt Peak	Spacewatch	MRX	980 m	MPC · JPL
632474	2008 JB_{23}	—	May 7, 2008	Kitt Peak	Spacewatch	·	1.6 km	MPC · JPL
632475	2008 JA_{39}	—	January 18, 2004	Palomar	NEAT	·	860 m	MPC · JPL
632476	2008 JG_{41}	—	February 21, 2007	Kitt Peak	Spacewatch	L5	8.7 km	MPC · JPL
632477	2008 JG_{43}	—	January 30, 2011	Mount Lemmon	Mount Lemmon Survey	·	2.1 km	MPC · JPL
632478	2008 JJ_{43}	—	October 2, 2009	Mount Lemmon	Mount Lemmon Survey	·	910 m	MPC · JPL
632479	2008 JJ_{44}	—	November 1, 2010	Kitt Peak	Spacewatch	·	1.5 km	MPC · JPL
632480	2008 JW_{49}	—	May 5, 2008	Mount Lemmon	Mount Lemmon Survey	·	680 m	MPC · JPL
632481	2008 JR_{50}	—	May 8, 2008	Mount Lemmon	Mount Lemmon Survey	·	730 m	MPC · JPL
632482	2008 KG	—	March 31, 2008	Mount Lemmon	Mount Lemmon Survey	·	950 m	MPC · JPL
632483	2008 KJ_{2}	—	May 27, 2008	Kitt Peak	Spacewatch	·	1.8 km	MPC · JPL
632484 Pamelagay	2008 KQ_{11}	Pamelagay	May 25, 2008	Haleakala	Bedient, J.	HNS	1.4 km	MPC · JPL
632485	2008 KL_{12}	—	May 12, 2008	Siding Spring	SSS	·	1.9 km	MPC · JPL
632486	2008 KH_{17}	—	February 23, 2007	Kitt Peak	Spacewatch	·	2.9 km	MPC · JPL
632487	2008 KO_{17}	—	December 4, 2005	Mount Lemmon	Mount Lemmon Survey	HYG	3.6 km	MPC · JPL
632488	2008 KQ_{18}	—	February 4, 2005	Mount Lemmon	Mount Lemmon Survey	L5	9.3 km	MPC · JPL
632489	2008 KM_{19}	—	April 4, 2008	Kitt Peak	Spacewatch	L5	8.9 km	MPC · JPL
632490	2008 KC_{20}	—	May 28, 2008	Mount Lemmon	Mount Lemmon Survey	·	610 m	MPC · JPL
632491	2008 KL_{20}	—	May 8, 2008	Kitt Peak	Spacewatch	·	1.4 km	MPC · JPL
632492	2008 KO_{20}	—	May 8, 2008	Kitt Peak	Spacewatch	·	1.4 km	MPC · JPL
632493	2008 KO_{21}	—	May 28, 2008	Mount Lemmon	Mount Lemmon Survey	·	1.7 km	MPC · JPL
632494	2008 KS_{23}	—	May 28, 2008	Kitt Peak	Spacewatch	HOF	2.0 km	MPC · JPL
632495	2008 KT_{23}	—	April 3, 2008	Mount Lemmon	Mount Lemmon Survey	·	1.6 km	MPC · JPL
632496	2008 KR_{25}	—	May 29, 2008	Mount Lemmon	Mount Lemmon Survey	WIT	850 m	MPC · JPL
632497	2008 KY_{26}	—	April 15, 2008	Mount Lemmon	Mount Lemmon Survey	·	1.8 km	MPC · JPL
632498	2008 KV_{27}	—	May 2, 2008	Mount Lemmon	Mount Lemmon Survey	V	560 m	MPC · JPL
632499	2008 KT_{31}	—	May 5, 2008	Kitt Peak	Spacewatch	·	1.9 km	MPC · JPL
632500	2008 KS_{32}	—	May 29, 2008	Mount Lemmon	Mount Lemmon Survey	·	2.1 km	MPC · JPL

== 632501–632600 ==
back to top

Designation			Discovery			Properties		Ref
Permanent	Provisional	Named after	Date	Site	Discoverer(s)	Category	Diam.	Ref
632501	2008 KU_{34}	—	May 29, 2008	Mount Lemmon	Mount Lemmon Survey	PHO	1.2 km	MPC · JPL
632502	2008 KU_{41}	—	May 31, 2008	Kitt Peak	Spacewatch	·	1.9 km	MPC · JPL
632503	2008 KR_{43}	—	November 1, 2013	Mount Lemmon	Mount Lemmon Survey	L5	7.9 km	MPC · JPL
632504	2008 KW_{43}	—	December 29, 2011	Catalina	CSS	·	3.0 km	MPC · JPL
632505	2008 KE_{45}	—	February 3, 2012	Mount Lemmon	Mount Lemmon Survey	·	1.9 km	MPC · JPL
632506	2008 KW_{45}	—	July 1, 2013	Haleakala	Pan-STARRS 1	·	1.6 km	MPC · JPL
632507	2008 KE_{47}	—	January 28, 2016	Mount Lemmon	Mount Lemmon Survey	AGN	970 m	MPC · JPL
632508	2008 KX_{48}	—	May 26, 2008	Kitt Peak	Spacewatch	·	1.8 km	MPC · JPL
632509	2008 LT_{6}	—	September 29, 2005	Mount Lemmon	Mount Lemmon Survey	·	1.5 km	MPC · JPL
632510	2008 LO_{8}	—	February 25, 2007	Mount Lemmon	Mount Lemmon Survey	·	1.8 km	MPC · JPL
632511	2008 LQ_{9}	—	January 27, 2007	Mount Lemmon	Mount Lemmon Survey	BRA	1.5 km	MPC · JPL
632512	2008 LD_{17}	—	April 30, 2008	Mount Lemmon	Mount Lemmon Survey	·	2.5 km	MPC · JPL
632513	2008 LL_{21}	—	June 9, 2008	Kitt Peak	Spacewatch	·	1.6 km	MPC · JPL
632514	2008 MS_{3}	—	June 30, 2008	Kitt Peak	Spacewatch	·	1.7 km	MPC · JPL
632515	2008 NP	—	July 1, 2008	Kitt Peak	Spacewatch	·	1.4 km	MPC · JPL
632516	2008 NH_{1}	—	October 24, 2005	Mauna Kea	A. Boattini	BRA	1.6 km	MPC · JPL
632517	2008 NG_{2}	—	January 21, 2002	Kitt Peak	Spacewatch	·	2.6 km	MPC · JPL
632518	2008 NV_{5}	—	July 3, 2008	Mount Lemmon	Mount Lemmon Survey	·	870 m	MPC · JPL
632519	2008 OP_{3}	—	March 16, 2004	Kitt Peak	Spacewatch	NYS	850 m	MPC · JPL
632520	2008 OS_{5}	—	July 27, 2008	Dauban	Kugel, C. R. F.	·	2.2 km	MPC · JPL
632521	2008 OD_{10}	—	July 10, 2008	Črni Vrh	Skvarč, J.	·	4.2 km	MPC · JPL
632522	2008 OR_{16}	—	July 28, 2008	Mount Lemmon	Mount Lemmon Survey	V	630 m	MPC · JPL
632523	2008 OQ_{26}	—	July 14, 2013	Haleakala	Pan-STARRS 1	·	1.8 km	MPC · JPL
632524	2008 OH_{28}	—	July 2, 2008	Kitt Peak	Spacewatch	·	2.0 km	MPC · JPL
632525	2008 OG_{30}	—	March 13, 2016	Haleakala	Pan-STARRS 1	AGN	960 m	MPC · JPL
632526	2008 OF_{31}	—	July 30, 2008	Kitt Peak	Spacewatch	·	2.0 km	MPC · JPL
632527	2008 PB_{6}	—	October 15, 2004	Mount Lemmon	Mount Lemmon Survey	·	1.8 km	MPC · JPL
632528	2008 PC_{7}	—	August 1, 2008	Bergisch Gladbach	W. Bickel	·	2.0 km	MPC · JPL
632529	2008 PE_{10}	—	July 26, 2003	Campo Imperatore	CINEOS	·	2.6 km	MPC · JPL
632530	2008 PE_{15}	—	July 30, 2008	Mount Lemmon	Mount Lemmon Survey	·	1.1 km	MPC · JPL
632531	2008 PK_{17}	—	August 11, 2008	Črni Vrh	Skvarč, J.	·	3.2 km	MPC · JPL
632532	2008 PM_{17}	—	August 11, 2008	Črni Vrh	Skvarč, J.	GEF	1.5 km	MPC · JPL
632533	2008 PF_{23}	—	August 2, 2008	Siding Spring	SSS	·	1.6 km	MPC · JPL
632534	2008 QB_{2}	—	August 3, 2008	Eygalayes	Sogorb, P.	·	1.5 km	MPC · JPL
632535	2008 QN_{2}	—	August 23, 2008	Tiki	Teamo, N.	·	1.4 km	MPC · JPL
632536	2008 QQ_{3}	—	August 24, 2008	Piszkéstető	K. Sárneczky	·	1.9 km	MPC · JPL
632537	2008 QV_{8}	—	August 25, 2008	Dauban	Kugel, C. R. F.	·	1.9 km	MPC · JPL
632538	2008 QZ_{8}	—	August 21, 2008	Kitt Peak	Spacewatch	·	2.5 km	MPC · JPL
632539	2008 QL_{9}	—	August 25, 2008	La Sagra	OAM	·	1.2 km	MPC · JPL
632540	2008 QB_{17}	—	August 26, 2008	La Sagra	OAM	·	760 m	MPC · JPL
632541	2008 QK_{19}	—	August 23, 2008	Goodricke-Pigott	R. A. Tucker	·	1.6 km	MPC · JPL
632542	2008 QE_{25}	—	August 25, 2008	Andrushivka	Kyrylenko, D., Y. Ivaščenko	·	1.4 km	MPC · JPL
632543	2008 QS_{32}	—	August 4, 2008	Siding Spring	SSS	PHO	1.0 km	MPC · JPL
632544	2008 QB_{36}	—	August 21, 2008	Kitt Peak	Spacewatch	·	2.5 km	MPC · JPL
632545	2008 QY_{37}	—	July 24, 2003	Palomar	NEAT	GEF	1.3 km	MPC · JPL
632546	2008 QY_{50}	—	July 29, 2008	Kitt Peak	Spacewatch	·	1.7 km	MPC · JPL
632547	2008 QU_{51}	—	August 24, 2008	Kitt Peak	Spacewatch	L4	6.6 km	MPC · JPL
632548	2008 RG_{3}	—	September 2, 2008	Kitt Peak	Spacewatch	L4	10 km	MPC · JPL
632549	2008 RB_{6}	—	October 4, 2003	Kitt Peak	Spacewatch	·	3.3 km	MPC · JPL
632550	2008 RH_{7}	—	November 20, 2004	Kitt Peak	Spacewatch	·	2.4 km	MPC · JPL
632551	2008 RO_{13}	—	September 4, 2008	Kitt Peak	Spacewatch	·	1.5 km	MPC · JPL
632552	2008 RX_{13}	—	August 24, 2008	Kitt Peak	Spacewatch	·	1.9 km	MPC · JPL
632553	2008 RF_{18}	—	September 4, 2008	Kitt Peak	Spacewatch	·	1.3 km	MPC · JPL
632554	2008 RG_{21}	—	September 4, 2008	Kitt Peak	Spacewatch	L4	7.5 km	MPC · JPL
632555	2008 RO_{25}	—	September 4, 2008	Goodricke-Pigott	R. A. Tucker	·	1.4 km	MPC · JPL
632556	2008 RO_{27}	—	September 8, 2008	Dauban	Kugel, C. R. F.	·	1.1 km	MPC · JPL
632557	2008 RR_{43}	—	September 2, 2008	Kitt Peak	Spacewatch	·	1.1 km	MPC · JPL
632558	2008 RM_{48}	—	January 25, 2006	Kitt Peak	Spacewatch	·	2.3 km	MPC · JPL
632559	2008 RV_{50}	—	September 3, 2008	Kitt Peak	Spacewatch	·	1.6 km	MPC · JPL
632560	2008 RB_{51}	—	November 19, 2004	Kitt Peak	Spacewatch	·	1.9 km	MPC · JPL
632561	2008 RF_{51}	—	September 3, 2008	Kitt Peak	Spacewatch	·	2.2 km	MPC · JPL
632562	2008 RT_{55}	—	September 3, 2008	Kitt Peak	Spacewatch	·	1.1 km	MPC · JPL
632563	2008 RU_{58}	—	October 24, 2003	Kitt Peak	Spacewatch	·	2.1 km	MPC · JPL
632564	2008 RH_{68}	—	September 4, 2008	Kitt Peak	Spacewatch	V	600 m	MPC · JPL
632565	2008 RR_{71}	—	August 26, 2003	Cerro Tololo	Deep Ecliptic Survey	·	1.5 km	MPC · JPL
632566	2008 RF_{74}	—	September 6, 2008	Catalina	CSS	·	2.6 km	MPC · JPL
632567	2008 RM_{75}	—	September 6, 2008	Mount Lemmon	Mount Lemmon Survey	V	550 m	MPC · JPL
632568	2008 RX_{76}	—	September 27, 1994	Kitt Peak	Spacewatch	·	1.7 km	MPC · JPL
632569	2008 RN_{83}	—	May 1, 2006	Kitt Peak	Deep Ecliptic Survey	·	1.5 km	MPC · JPL
632570	2008 RH_{86}	—	September 5, 2008	Kitt Peak	Spacewatch	·	970 m	MPC · JPL
632571	2008 RE_{97}	—	September 7, 2008	Mount Lemmon	Mount Lemmon Survey	EOS	1.7 km	MPC · JPL
632572	2008 RA_{128}	—	September 6, 2008	Kitt Peak	Spacewatch	KOR	1.0 km	MPC · JPL
632573	2008 RR_{134}	—	September 5, 2008	Kitt Peak	Spacewatch	·	1.2 km	MPC · JPL
632574	2008 RT_{146}	—	September 2, 2008	Kitt Peak	Spacewatch	·	2.6 km	MPC · JPL
632575	2008 RT_{147}	—	March 26, 2006	Mount Lemmon	Mount Lemmon Survey	3:2 · SHU	4.4 km	MPC · JPL
632576	2008 RV_{147}	—	October 22, 2003	Kitt Peak	Spacewatch	·	2.1 km	MPC · JPL
632577	2008 RS_{149}	—	September 15, 2009	Kitt Peak	Spacewatch	L4	7.7 km	MPC · JPL
632578	2008 RC_{150}	—	October 2, 2010	Mount Lemmon	Mount Lemmon Survey	L4	7.8 km	MPC · JPL
632579	2008 RD_{150}	—	September 5, 2008	Kitt Peak	Spacewatch	·	1.2 km	MPC · JPL
632580	2008 RO_{153}	—	September 6, 2008	Mount Lemmon	Mount Lemmon Survey	·	2.5 km	MPC · JPL
632581	2008 RH_{167}	—	September 3, 2008	Kitt Peak	Spacewatch	L4	7.3 km	MPC · JPL
632582	2008 RX_{168}	—	September 22, 2003	Kitt Peak	Spacewatch	·	1.6 km	MPC · JPL
632583	2008 RB_{169}	—	September 2, 2008	Kitt Peak	Spacewatch	KOR	1.3 km	MPC · JPL
632584	2008 RD_{174}	—	September 9, 2008	Mount Lemmon	Mount Lemmon Survey	L4	7.7 km	MPC · JPL
632585	2008 RR_{174}	—	September 5, 2008	Kitt Peak	Spacewatch	3:2	5.3 km	MPC · JPL
632586	2008 RA_{176}	—	September 5, 2008	Kitt Peak	Spacewatch	L4	6.7 km	MPC · JPL
632587	2008 RT_{178}	—	September 9, 2008	Mount Lemmon	Mount Lemmon Survey	KOR	970 m	MPC · JPL
632588	2008 RZ_{181}	—	September 6, 2008	Mount Lemmon	Mount Lemmon Survey	L4	6.6 km	MPC · JPL
632589	2008 SX_{6}	—	August 25, 2001	Palomar	NEAT	·	960 m	MPC · JPL
632590	2008 SK_{14}	—	July 29, 2008	Kitt Peak	Spacewatch	·	1.5 km	MPC · JPL
632591	2008 SJ_{17}	—	September 19, 2008	Kitt Peak	Spacewatch	·	1.2 km	MPC · JPL
632592	2008 SC_{24}	—	September 6, 2008	Mount Lemmon	Mount Lemmon Survey	·	1.1 km	MPC · JPL
632593	2008 SS_{27}	—	September 10, 2008	Kitt Peak	Spacewatch	·	1.1 km	MPC · JPL
632594	2008 SF_{49}	—	September 20, 2008	Mount Lemmon	Mount Lemmon Survey	KOR	1.3 km	MPC · JPL
632595	2008 SM_{49}	—	September 20, 2008	Mount Lemmon	Mount Lemmon Survey	·	1.3 km	MPC · JPL
632596	2008 SB_{70}	—	September 22, 2008	Mount Lemmon	Mount Lemmon Survey	·	1.6 km	MPC · JPL
632597	2008 SM_{76}	—	September 23, 2008	Mount Lemmon	Mount Lemmon Survey	·	2.8 km	MPC · JPL
632598	2008 SU_{76}	—	April 1, 2003	Palomar	NEAT	V	580 m	MPC · JPL
632599	2008 SS_{82}	—	September 26, 2008	Cordell-Lorenz	D. T. Durig	·	2.3 km	MPC · JPL
632600	2008 SO_{92}	—	January 31, 1995	Kitt Peak	Spacewatch	MAS	670 m	MPC · JPL

== 632601–632700 ==
back to top

Designation			Discovery			Properties		Ref
Permanent	Provisional	Named after	Date	Site	Discoverer(s)	Category	Diam.	Ref
632601	2008 SZ_{108}	—	August 26, 2003	Črni Vrh	Mikuž, H.	·	2.0 km	MPC · JPL
632602	2008 SJ_{111}	—	September 22, 2008	Kitt Peak	Spacewatch	·	1.6 km	MPC · JPL
632603	2008 SK_{121}	—	September 22, 2008	Mount Lemmon	Mount Lemmon Survey	·	2.0 km	MPC · JPL
632604	2008 ST_{123}	—	March 11, 2005	Mount Lemmon	Mount Lemmon Survey	·	2.1 km	MPC · JPL
632605	2008 SL_{133}	—	September 23, 2008	Kitt Peak	Spacewatch	(2076)	790 m	MPC · JPL
632606	2008 SG_{135}	—	February 4, 2006	Kitt Peak	Spacewatch	·	1.8 km	MPC · JPL
632607	2008 SL_{144}	—	September 25, 2008	Mount Lemmon	Mount Lemmon Survey	H	330 m	MPC · JPL
632608	2008 SA_{147}	—	September 9, 2008	Kitt Peak	Spacewatch	·	1.2 km	MPC · JPL
632609	2008 SH_{151}	—	November 15, 2003	Kitt Peak	Spacewatch	·	3.1 km	MPC · JPL
632610	2008 SD_{169}	—	September 3, 2008	Kitt Peak	Spacewatch	TRE	2.2 km	MPC · JPL
632611	2008 SO_{182}	—	October 1, 2003	Kitt Peak	Spacewatch	·	1.7 km	MPC · JPL
632612	2008 SD_{188}	—	September 21, 2008	Kitt Peak	Spacewatch	·	2.5 km	MPC · JPL
632613	2008 SH_{199}	—	February 17, 2007	Catalina	CSS	·	1.4 km	MPC · JPL
632614	2008 SH_{200}	—	September 26, 2008	Kitt Peak	Spacewatch	·	930 m	MPC · JPL
632615	2008 SZ_{205}	—	March 16, 2007	Kitt Peak	Spacewatch	·	920 m	MPC · JPL
632616	2008 SX_{209}	—	September 28, 2008	Mount Lemmon	Mount Lemmon Survey	·	1.9 km	MPC · JPL
632617	2008 SE_{213}	—	September 16, 2003	Kitt Peak	Spacewatch	·	1.6 km	MPC · JPL
632618	2008 SH_{219}	—	October 1, 2008	Mount Lemmon	Mount Lemmon Survey	·	2.5 km	MPC · JPL
632619	2008 SV_{227}	—	September 28, 2008	Mount Lemmon	Mount Lemmon Survey	L4	9.3 km	MPC · JPL
632620	2008 SZ_{227}	—	March 16, 2007	Kitt Peak	Spacewatch	·	1.1 km	MPC · JPL
632621	2008 SO_{228}	—	September 28, 2008	Mount Lemmon	Mount Lemmon Survey	L4	6.7 km	MPC · JPL
632622	2008 SD_{235}	—	September 28, 2008	Mount Lemmon	Mount Lemmon Survey	3:2	4.4 km	MPC · JPL
632623	2008 SX_{237}	—	August 21, 2001	Kitt Peak	Spacewatch	·	690 m	MPC · JPL
632624	2008 SV_{238}	—	September 29, 2008	Mount Lemmon	Mount Lemmon Survey	KOR	1.2 km	MPC · JPL
632625	2008 SL_{265}	—	September 28, 2008	Mount Lemmon	Mount Lemmon Survey	·	1.7 km	MPC · JPL
632626	2008 SL_{298}	—	September 21, 2008	Catalina	CSS	·	2.3 km	MPC · JPL
632627	2008 SL_{310}	—	September 21, 2003	Palomar	NEAT	·	2.4 km	MPC · JPL
632628	2008 SB_{311}	—	November 17, 2004	Campo Imperatore	CINEOS	KOR	1.7 km	MPC · JPL
632629	2008 SS_{312}	—	September 22, 2008	Mount Lemmon	Mount Lemmon Survey	·	1.0 km	MPC · JPL
632630	2008 SK_{313}	—	September 27, 2008	Mount Lemmon	Mount Lemmon Survey	V	560 m	MPC · JPL
632631	2008 SQ_{313}	—	September 24, 2008	Mount Lemmon	Mount Lemmon Survey	·	2.4 km	MPC · JPL
632632	2008 SO_{315}	—	September 28, 2008	Mount Lemmon	Mount Lemmon Survey	·	1.5 km	MPC · JPL
632633	2008 ST_{315}	—	September 22, 2008	Catalina	CSS	GEF	1.3 km	MPC · JPL
632634	2008 SC_{317}	—	October 25, 2012	Mount Lemmon	Mount Lemmon Survey	·	870 m	MPC · JPL
632635	2008 SZ_{324}	—	January 16, 2015	Haleakala	Pan-STARRS 1	·	2.1 km	MPC · JPL
632636	2008 SK_{336}	—	April 5, 2016	Haleakala	Pan-STARRS 1	·	1.7 km	MPC · JPL
632637	2008 SP_{336}	—	June 1, 2012	Mount Lemmon	Mount Lemmon Survey	·	1.3 km	MPC · JPL
632638	2008 SS_{340}	—	September 29, 2008	Mount Lemmon	Mount Lemmon Survey	·	2.4 km	MPC · JPL
632639	2008 SB_{344}	—	September 25, 2008	Kitt Peak	Spacewatch	·	1.7 km	MPC · JPL
632640	2008 SA_{346}	—	September 20, 2008	Mount Lemmon	Mount Lemmon Survey	L4	6.4 km	MPC · JPL
632641	2008 SO_{346}	—	September 22, 2008	Kitt Peak	Spacewatch	·	2.0 km	MPC · JPL
632642	2008 SS_{348}	—	September 29, 2008	Mount Lemmon	Mount Lemmon Survey	·	1.9 km	MPC · JPL
632643	2008 SR_{359}	—	December 28, 2005	Mount Lemmon	Mount Lemmon Survey	·	1.2 km	MPC · JPL
632644	2008 SH_{360}	—	September 23, 2008	Mount Lemmon	Mount Lemmon Survey	·	1.7 km	MPC · JPL
632645	2008 TT_{14}	—	March 18, 1996	Kitt Peak	Spacewatch	V	640 m	MPC · JPL
632646	2008 TZ_{24}	—	March 31, 2016	Haleakala	Pan-STARRS 1	·	1.5 km	MPC · JPL
632647	2008 TD_{30}	—	October 1, 2008	Mount Lemmon	Mount Lemmon Survey	L4	6.7 km	MPC · JPL
632648	2008 TQ_{35}	—	October 1, 2008	Mount Lemmon	Mount Lemmon Survey	·	1.5 km	MPC · JPL
632649	2008 TA_{44}	—	September 21, 2004	Socorro	LINEAR	·	1.1 km	MPC · JPL
632650	2008 TR_{50}	—	September 29, 2003	Kitt Peak	Spacewatch	KOR	1.3 km	MPC · JPL
632651	2008 TP_{56}	—	October 2, 2008	Kitt Peak	Spacewatch	·	1 km	MPC · JPL
632652	2008 TL_{71}	—	October 2, 2008	Kitt Peak	Spacewatch	EOS	1.6 km	MPC · JPL
632653	2008 TJ_{78}	—	October 2, 2008	Mount Lemmon	Mount Lemmon Survey	KOR	1.1 km	MPC · JPL
632654	2008 TJ_{79}	—	September 23, 2008	Mount Lemmon	Mount Lemmon Survey	·	1.7 km	MPC · JPL
632655	2008 TD_{81}	—	April 8, 2002	Kitt Peak	Spacewatch	·	1.3 km	MPC · JPL
632656	2008 TK_{83}	—	September 25, 2008	Kitt Peak	Spacewatch	·	1.6 km	MPC · JPL
632657	2008 TD_{110}	—	October 6, 2008	Mount Lemmon	Mount Lemmon Survey	EOS	1.7 km	MPC · JPL
632658	2008 TK_{125}	—	October 8, 2008	Mount Lemmon	Mount Lemmon Survey	·	910 m	MPC · JPL
632659	2008 TN_{126}	—	September 23, 2008	Kitt Peak	Spacewatch	·	1.4 km	MPC · JPL
632660	2008 TJ_{133}	—	October 8, 2008	Mount Lemmon	Mount Lemmon Survey	·	2.3 km	MPC · JPL
632661	2008 TT_{136}	—	October 8, 2008	Kitt Peak	Spacewatch	·	1.8 km	MPC · JPL
632662	2008 TZ_{138}	—	March 9, 1997	Kitt Peak	Spacewatch	·	1.7 km	MPC · JPL
632663	2008 TA_{141}	—	October 9, 2008	Mount Lemmon	Mount Lemmon Survey	·	1.4 km	MPC · JPL
632664	2008 TN_{141}	—	October 9, 2008	Mount Lemmon	Mount Lemmon Survey	·	960 m	MPC · JPL
632665	2008 TS_{141}	—	February 24, 2006	Kitt Peak	Spacewatch	·	2.4 km	MPC · JPL
632666	2008 TE_{155}	—	October 9, 2008	Mount Lemmon	Mount Lemmon Survey	EOS	1.7 km	MPC · JPL
632667	2008 TH_{155}	—	October 9, 2008	Mount Lemmon	Mount Lemmon Survey	·	1.8 km	MPC · JPL
632668	2008 TS_{167}	—	October 10, 2008	Kitt Peak	Spacewatch	EOS	1.6 km	MPC · JPL
632669	2008 TK_{169}	—	October 7, 2008	Kitt Peak	Spacewatch	·	2.0 km	MPC · JPL
632670	2008 TL_{176}	—	March 9, 2005	Mount Lemmon	Mount Lemmon Survey	3:2	4.8 km	MPC · JPL
632671	2008 TN_{176}	—	December 8, 2005	Kitt Peak	Spacewatch	MAS	800 m	MPC · JPL
632672	2008 TZ_{178}	—	October 1, 2008	Catalina	CSS	·	2.6 km	MPC · JPL
632673	2008 TM_{187}	—	November 19, 2003	Kitt Peak	Spacewatch	EOS	1.8 km	MPC · JPL
632674	2008 TL_{193}	—	October 8, 2008	Mount Lemmon	Mount Lemmon Survey	·	1.3 km	MPC · JPL
632675	2008 TJ_{194}	—	September 6, 2008	Kitt Peak	Spacewatch	·	1.7 km	MPC · JPL
632676	2008 TK_{194}	—	October 3, 2008	Mount Lemmon	Mount Lemmon Survey	·	2.4 km	MPC · JPL
632677	2008 TA_{196}	—	January 4, 2014	Mount Lemmon	Mount Lemmon Survey	·	1.3 km	MPC · JPL
632678	2008 TN_{211}	—	October 10, 2008	Mount Lemmon	Mount Lemmon Survey	L4	7.5 km	MPC · JPL
632679	2008 TL_{213}	—	May 26, 2011	Mount Lemmon	Mount Lemmon Survey	·	880 m	MPC · JPL
632680	2008 TU_{216}	—	October 1, 2008	Mount Lemmon	Mount Lemmon Survey	L4	7.3 km	MPC · JPL
632681	2008 TW_{217}	—	October 6, 2008	Kitt Peak	Spacewatch	·	1.5 km	MPC · JPL
632682	2008 TX_{217}	—	October 8, 2008	Mount Lemmon	Mount Lemmon Survey	NAE	1.8 km	MPC · JPL
632683	2008 TC_{219}	—	October 7, 2008	Kitt Peak	Spacewatch	3:2	5.4 km	MPC · JPL
632684	2008 TU_{220}	—	October 8, 2008	Mount Lemmon	Mount Lemmon Survey	·	1.7 km	MPC · JPL
632685	2008 TB_{227}	—	October 8, 2008	Mount Lemmon	Mount Lemmon Survey	3:2	4.3 km	MPC · JPL
632686	2008 TK_{230}	—	October 7, 2008	Mount Lemmon	Mount Lemmon Survey	EOS	1.4 km	MPC · JPL
632687	2008 UF_{9}	—	October 6, 1997	Kitt Peak	Spacewatch	·	930 m	MPC · JPL
632688	2008 UK_{20}	—	September 22, 2008	Mount Lemmon	Mount Lemmon Survey	NYS	920 m	MPC · JPL
632689	2008 UK_{23}	—	October 10, 2008	Mount Lemmon	Mount Lemmon Survey	·	1.6 km	MPC · JPL
632690	2008 UR_{39}	—	October 15, 2004	Mount Lemmon	Mount Lemmon Survey	·	1.1 km	MPC · JPL
632691	2008 UN_{44}	—	October 20, 2008	Mount Lemmon	Mount Lemmon Survey	·	860 m	MPC · JPL
632692	2008 UE_{45}	—	October 3, 2008	Kitt Peak	Spacewatch	KOR	1.4 km	MPC · JPL
632693	2008 UO_{46}	—	October 20, 2008	Kitt Peak	Spacewatch	·	1.2 km	MPC · JPL
632694	2008 UE_{50}	—	August 22, 2004	Kitt Peak	Spacewatch	·	1.1 km	MPC · JPL
632695	2008 UY_{51}	—	October 20, 2008	Mount Lemmon	Mount Lemmon Survey	·	1.6 km	MPC · JPL
632696	2008 UO_{64}	—	April 19, 2007	Mount Lemmon	Mount Lemmon Survey	·	1.1 km	MPC · JPL
632697	2008 UX_{65}	—	October 21, 2008	Kitt Peak	Spacewatch	·	1.6 km	MPC · JPL
632698	2008 UQ_{72}	—	September 12, 2002	Palomar	NEAT	EOS	2.1 km	MPC · JPL
632699	2008 UY_{81}	—	September 22, 2008	Kitt Peak	Spacewatch	·	2.0 km	MPC · JPL
632700	2008 UE_{88}	—	September 26, 2008	Kitt Peak	Spacewatch	L4	6.5 km	MPC · JPL

== 632701–632800 ==
back to top

Designation			Discovery			Properties		Ref
Permanent	Provisional	Named after	Date	Site	Discoverer(s)	Category	Diam.	Ref
632701	2008 UA_{110}	—	October 22, 2008	Kitt Peak	Spacewatch	EOS	1.9 km	MPC · JPL
632702	2008 UU_{128}	—	October 23, 2008	Kitt Peak	Spacewatch	·	1.3 km	MPC · JPL
632703	2008 UY_{128}	—	October 10, 2008	Mount Lemmon	Mount Lemmon Survey	L4 · ERY	8.5 km	MPC · JPL
632704	2008 US_{132}	—	May 4, 2006	Kitt Peak	Spacewatch	·	2.0 km	MPC · JPL
632705	2008 UH_{133}	—	October 23, 2008	Kitt Peak	Spacewatch	·	1.8 km	MPC · JPL
632706	2008 UV_{135}	—	October 1, 2008	Mount Lemmon	Mount Lemmon Survey	·	2.0 km	MPC · JPL
632707	2008 UE_{139}	—	October 23, 2008	Kitt Peak	Spacewatch	MAS	760 m	MPC · JPL
632708	2008 UY_{142}	—	September 28, 2003	Kitt Peak	Spacewatch	·	1.8 km	MPC · JPL
632709	2008 UT_{151}	—	October 23, 2008	Mount Lemmon	Mount Lemmon Survey	KOR	1.5 km	MPC · JPL
632710	2008 UL_{153}	—	October 23, 2008	Mount Lemmon	Mount Lemmon Survey	V	580 m	MPC · JPL
632711	2008 UK_{159}	—	February 9, 2005	Kitt Peak	Spacewatch	·	2.1 km	MPC · JPL
632712	2008 UE_{162}	—	November 18, 2003	Kitt Peak	Spacewatch	·	1.8 km	MPC · JPL
632713	2008 UC_{178}	—	September 22, 2008	Kitt Peak	Spacewatch	·	1.7 km	MPC · JPL
632714	2008 UD_{182}	—	September 29, 2008	Kitt Peak	Spacewatch	·	1.9 km	MPC · JPL
632715	2008 UH_{195}	—	October 26, 2008	Mount Lemmon	Mount Lemmon Survey	PHO	800 m	MPC · JPL
632716	2008 UL_{213}	—	October 24, 2008	Catalina	CSS	·	2.3 km	MPC · JPL
632717	2008 UK_{215}	—	September 11, 2002	Palomar	NEAT	·	3.9 km	MPC · JPL
632718	2008 UB_{217}	—	September 4, 2008	Kitt Peak	Spacewatch	·	1.9 km	MPC · JPL
632719	2008 UH_{232}	—	September 20, 2003	Kitt Peak	Spacewatch	·	2.4 km	MPC · JPL
632720	2008 UN_{235}	—	October 26, 2008	Mount Lemmon	Mount Lemmon Survey	·	1.0 km	MPC · JPL
632721	2008 UW_{236}	—	September 14, 2007	Kitt Peak	Spacewatch	·	2.2 km	MPC · JPL
632722	2008 UD_{246}	—	March 3, 2006	Catalina	CSS	·	1.7 km	MPC · JPL
632723	2008 UA_{274}	—	October 2, 2008	Mount Lemmon	Mount Lemmon Survey	EOS	1.4 km	MPC · JPL
632724	2008 UG_{275}	—	November 16, 2003	Kitt Peak	Spacewatch	KOR	1.2 km	MPC · JPL
632725	2008 UN_{276}	—	October 28, 2008	Mount Lemmon	Mount Lemmon Survey	KOR	1.0 km	MPC · JPL
632726	2008 UG_{279}	—	October 28, 2008	Mount Lemmon	Mount Lemmon Survey	KOR	1.1 km	MPC · JPL
632727	2008 UN_{280}	—	October 28, 2008	Mount Lemmon	Mount Lemmon Survey	TRE	1.9 km	MPC · JPL
632728	2008 UF_{288}	—	September 29, 2008	Kitt Peak	Spacewatch	·	2.2 km	MPC · JPL
632729	2008 UQ_{295}	—	January 19, 2005	Kitt Peak	Spacewatch	·	2.0 km	MPC · JPL
632730	2008 UH_{298}	—	October 29, 2008	Kitt Peak	Spacewatch	·	1.4 km	MPC · JPL
632731	2008 UQ_{316}	—	September 8, 2007	Anderson Mesa	LONEOS	EOS	2.5 km	MPC · JPL
632732	2008 UA_{320}	—	October 31, 2008	Mount Lemmon	Mount Lemmon Survey	EOS	1.4 km	MPC · JPL
632733	2008 UL_{320}	—	October 31, 2008	Catalina	CSS	·	3.4 km	MPC · JPL
632734	2008 UX_{327}	—	October 1, 2008	Kitt Peak	Spacewatch	·	2.0 km	MPC · JPL
632735	2008 UY_{336}	—	October 20, 2008	Kitt Peak	Spacewatch	·	3.5 km	MPC · JPL
632736	2008 UU_{338}	—	August 27, 2003	Palomar	NEAT	·	2.5 km	MPC · JPL
632737	2008 UT_{346}	—	November 17, 2014	Haleakala	Pan-STARRS 1	·	1.6 km	MPC · JPL
632738	2008 UE_{348}	—	November 19, 2003	Kitt Peak	Spacewatch	·	1.5 km	MPC · JPL
632739	2008 UN_{351}	—	September 17, 2003	Kitt Peak	Spacewatch	BRA	1.7 km	MPC · JPL
632740	2008 UQ_{371}	—	November 15, 2003	Kitt Peak	Spacewatch	EOS	1.5 km	MPC · JPL
632741	2008 UP_{378}	—	December 13, 2012	Mount Lemmon	Mount Lemmon Survey	·	820 m	MPC · JPL
632742	2008 UP_{379}	—	October 23, 2008	Kitt Peak	Spacewatch	·	2.6 km	MPC · JPL
632743	2008 UR_{379}	—	May 27, 2012	Mount Lemmon	Mount Lemmon Survey	·	2.1 km	MPC · JPL
632744	2008 UY_{380}	—	October 12, 2013	Kitt Peak	Spacewatch	KOR	1.1 km	MPC · JPL
632745	2008 UB_{381}	—	March 12, 2010	Kitt Peak	Spacewatch	·	760 m	MPC · JPL
632746	2008 UE_{387}	—	October 27, 2008	Mount Lemmon	Mount Lemmon Survey	·	1.5 km	MPC · JPL
632747	2008 UT_{387}	—	October 26, 2008	Kitt Peak	Spacewatch	·	2.7 km	MPC · JPL
632748	2008 UU_{390}	—	September 14, 2013	Haleakala	Pan-STARRS 1	EOS	1.4 km	MPC · JPL
632749	2008 UW_{392}	—	October 14, 2013	Kitt Peak	Spacewatch	·	1.7 km	MPC · JPL
632750	2008 UB_{400}	—	March 16, 2016	Haleakala	Pan-STARRS 1	·	1.9 km	MPC · JPL
632751	2008 UV_{400}	—	October 8, 2008	Mount Lemmon	Mount Lemmon Survey	·	2.6 km	MPC · JPL
632752	2008 UG_{403}	—	October 30, 2008	Mount Lemmon	Mount Lemmon Survey	·	3.1 km	MPC · JPL
632753	2008 UN_{404}	—	October 26, 2008	Kitt Peak	Spacewatch	EOS	1.6 km	MPC · JPL
632754	2008 UX_{409}	—	October 28, 2008	Kitt Peak	Spacewatch	EOS	1.8 km	MPC · JPL
632755	2008 VE_{9}	—	November 29, 2003	Kitt Peak	Spacewatch	·	2.7 km	MPC · JPL
632756	2008 VT_{11}	—	November 2, 2008	Mount Lemmon	Mount Lemmon Survey	·	2.0 km	MPC · JPL
632757	2008 VD_{17}	—	November 1, 2008	Kitt Peak	Spacewatch	·	1.1 km	MPC · JPL
632758	2008 VY_{28}	—	November 2, 2008	Kitt Peak	Spacewatch	·	2.2 km	MPC · JPL
632759	2008 VB_{32}	—	November 2, 2008	Mount Lemmon	Mount Lemmon Survey	·	2.5 km	MPC · JPL
632760	2008 VW_{33}	—	October 6, 2008	Mount Lemmon	Mount Lemmon Survey	·	1.8 km	MPC · JPL
632761	2008 VA_{37}	—	October 6, 2008	Mount Lemmon	Mount Lemmon Survey	3:2	5.4 km	MPC · JPL
632762	2008 VS_{37}	—	November 2, 2008	Mount Lemmon	Mount Lemmon Survey	EOS	1.6 km	MPC · JPL
632763	2008 VB_{38}	—	January 16, 2005	Mauna Kea	P. A. Wiegert, D. D. Balam	·	2.2 km	MPC · JPL
632764	2008 VC_{43}	—	November 3, 2008	Kitt Peak	Spacewatch	VER	2.6 km	MPC · JPL
632765	2008 VU_{43}	—	November 3, 2008	Mount Lemmon	Mount Lemmon Survey	·	2.2 km	MPC · JPL
632766	2008 VE_{44}	—	November 3, 2008	Kitt Peak	Spacewatch	·	1.3 km	MPC · JPL
632767	2008 VG_{58}	—	November 6, 2008	Mount Lemmon	Mount Lemmon Survey	EOS	1.8 km	MPC · JPL
632768	2008 VG_{59}	—	October 22, 2008	Kitt Peak	Spacewatch	EOS	2.0 km	MPC · JPL
632769	2008 VF_{60}	—	January 16, 2005	Mauna Kea	P. A. Wiegert, D. D. Balam	·	1.7 km	MPC · JPL
632770	2008 VF_{61}	—	November 8, 2008	Mount Lemmon	Mount Lemmon Survey	·	1.6 km	MPC · JPL
632771	2008 VX_{62}	—	November 8, 2008	Kitt Peak	Spacewatch	·	1.4 km	MPC · JPL
632772	2008 VL_{63}	—	November 8, 2008	Kitt Peak	Spacewatch	·	1.9 km	MPC · JPL
632773	2008 VS_{77}	—	November 6, 2008	Mount Lemmon	Mount Lemmon Survey	EOS	1.7 km	MPC · JPL
632774	2008 VS_{80}	—	January 6, 2006	Kitt Peak	Spacewatch	·	1.1 km	MPC · JPL
632775	2008 VQ_{81}	—	March 27, 2003	Kitt Peak	Spacewatch	L4	10 km	MPC · JPL
632776	2008 VS_{82}	—	November 8, 2008	Mount Lemmon	Mount Lemmon Survey	KOR	1.4 km	MPC · JPL
632777	2008 VV_{82}	—	November 3, 2008	Mount Lemmon	Mount Lemmon Survey	·	2.7 km	MPC · JPL
632778	2008 VX_{82}	—	March 10, 2005	Mount Lemmon	Mount Lemmon Survey	·	2.8 km	MPC · JPL
632779	2008 VP_{83}	—	March 21, 2001	Kitt Peak	Spacewatch	·	2.0 km	MPC · JPL
632780	2008 VS_{84}	—	November 6, 2008	Kitt Peak	Spacewatch	·	1.0 km	MPC · JPL
632781	2008 VG_{87}	—	October 7, 1996	Kitt Peak	Spacewatch	·	1.2 km	MPC · JPL
632782	2008 VL_{89}	—	November 2, 2008	Mount Lemmon	Mount Lemmon Survey	·	2.1 km	MPC · JPL
632783	2008 VT_{89}	—	April 4, 2014	Mount Lemmon	Mount Lemmon Survey	·	1.0 km	MPC · JPL
632784	2008 VG_{90}	—	January 17, 2015	Haleakala	Pan-STARRS 1	·	2.0 km	MPC · JPL
632785	2008 VP_{90}	—	November 8, 2008	Kitt Peak	Spacewatch	EOS	1.7 km	MPC · JPL
632786	2008 VQ_{94}	—	November 6, 2008	Mount Lemmon	Mount Lemmon Survey	·	1.5 km	MPC · JPL
632787	2008 VT_{96}	—	October 24, 2013	Mount Lemmon	Mount Lemmon Survey	·	1.4 km	MPC · JPL
632788	2008 VB_{97}	—	March 6, 2016	Haleakala	Pan-STARRS 1	·	1.6 km	MPC · JPL
632789	2008 VK_{97}	—	April 30, 2016	Haleakala	Pan-STARRS 1	KOR	1.0 km	MPC · JPL
632790	2008 VG_{99}	—	November 1, 2008	Kitt Peak	Spacewatch	·	2.0 km	MPC · JPL
632791	2008 WT	—	October 2, 2008	Mount Lemmon	Mount Lemmon Survey	NYS	1.1 km	MPC · JPL
632792	2008 WP_{3}	—	October 19, 2008	Kitt Peak	Spacewatch	TEL	1.2 km	MPC · JPL
632793	2008 WK_{4}	—	October 2, 2008	Kitt Peak	Spacewatch	·	1.9 km	MPC · JPL
632794	2008 WU_{4}	—	April 19, 2007	Kitt Peak	Spacewatch	·	1.1 km	MPC · JPL
632795	2008 WW_{5}	—	November 2, 2008	Kitt Peak	Spacewatch	·	1.6 km	MPC · JPL
632796	2008 WE_{9}	—	November 17, 2008	Kitt Peak	Spacewatch	NAE	1.8 km	MPC · JPL
632797	2008 WX_{10}	—	October 27, 2008	Kitt Peak	Spacewatch	EOS	2.1 km	MPC · JPL
632798	2008 WA_{16}	—	February 2, 2005	Kitt Peak	Spacewatch	·	2.6 km	MPC · JPL
632799	2008 WL_{17}	—	November 1, 2008	Kitt Peak	Spacewatch	·	1.3 km	MPC · JPL
632800	2008 WG_{20}	—	December 14, 2003	Kitt Peak	Spacewatch	·	1.9 km	MPC · JPL

== 632801–632900 ==
back to top

Designation			Discovery			Properties		Ref
Permanent	Provisional	Named after	Date	Site	Discoverer(s)	Category	Diam.	Ref
632801	2008 WT_{30}	—	November 19, 2008	Mount Lemmon	Mount Lemmon Survey	·	1.1 km	MPC · JPL
632802	2008 WB_{32}	—	September 4, 2007	Mount Lemmon	Mount Lemmon Survey	·	1.7 km	MPC · JPL
632803	2008 WZ_{36}	—	November 3, 2008	Kitt Peak	Spacewatch	EOS	1.7 km	MPC · JPL
632804	2008 WH_{40}	—	October 24, 2008	Kitt Peak	Spacewatch	KOR	1.5 km	MPC · JPL
632805	2008 WK_{51}	—	October 31, 2008	Kitt Peak	Spacewatch	·	2.0 km	MPC · JPL
632806	2008 WQ_{55}	—	November 1, 2008	Mount Lemmon	Mount Lemmon Survey	KOR	1.1 km	MPC · JPL
632807	2008 WT_{55}	—	October 27, 2008	Mount Lemmon	Mount Lemmon Survey	·	2.6 km	MPC · JPL
632808	2008 WJ_{56}	—	November 20, 2008	Mount Lemmon	Mount Lemmon Survey	KOR	1.2 km	MPC · JPL
632809	2008 WL_{57}	—	November 3, 2008	Kitt Peak	Spacewatch	·	1.6 km	MPC · JPL
632810	2008 WD_{58}	—	November 20, 2008	Mount Lemmon	Mount Lemmon Survey	·	1.5 km	MPC · JPL
632811	2008 WJ_{62}	—	November 24, 2008	Mayhill	Lowe, A.	·	1.1 km	MPC · JPL
632812	2008 WM_{79}	—	November 20, 2008	Mount Lemmon	Mount Lemmon Survey	KOR	1.2 km	MPC · JPL
632813	2008 WC_{80}	—	November 2, 2008	Mount Lemmon	Mount Lemmon Survey	·	2.1 km	MPC · JPL
632814	2008 WC_{83}	—	November 20, 2008	Kitt Peak	Spacewatch	·	1.8 km	MPC · JPL
632815	2008 WQ_{86}	—	December 25, 2005	Mount Lemmon	Mount Lemmon Survey	·	1.3 km	MPC · JPL
632816	2008 WQ_{87}	—	November 21, 2008	Mount Lemmon	Mount Lemmon Survey	·	1.9 km	MPC · JPL
632817	2008 WV_{89}	—	June 25, 2007	Lulin	LUSS	EUN	1.8 km	MPC · JPL
632818	2008 WY_{93}	—	November 26, 2008	Charleston	R. Holmes	EOS	2.5 km	MPC · JPL
632819	2008 WB_{99}	—	February 27, 2006	Kitt Peak	Spacewatch	MAS	780 m	MPC · JPL
632820	2008 WU_{112}	—	November 30, 2008	Kitt Peak	Spacewatch	·	2.1 km	MPC · JPL
632821	2008 WF_{116}	—	November 30, 2008	Kitt Peak	Spacewatch	EOS	1.5 km	MPC · JPL
632822	2008 WO_{116}	—	November 30, 2008	Kitt Peak	Spacewatch	SUL	1.9 km	MPC · JPL
632823	2008 WQ_{121}	—	November 9, 2008	Mount Lemmon	Mount Lemmon Survey	·	3.1 km	MPC · JPL
632824	2008 WZ_{133}	—	November 19, 2008	Mount Lemmon	Mount Lemmon Survey	·	2.2 km	MPC · JPL
632825	2008 WO_{139}	—	November 30, 2008	Socorro	LINEAR	·	2.6 km	MPC · JPL
632826	2008 WM_{142}	—	December 2, 2004	Kitt Peak	Spacewatch	EUN	1.3 km	MPC · JPL
632827	2008 WW_{142}	—	March 10, 2005	Mount Lemmon	Mount Lemmon Survey	·	2.1 km	MPC · JPL
632828	2008 WC_{145}	—	November 22, 2008	Kitt Peak	Spacewatch	EOS	1.9 km	MPC · JPL
632829	2008 WD_{148}	—	November 1, 2013	Mount Lemmon	Mount Lemmon Survey	EOS	1.9 km	MPC · JPL
632830	2008 WW_{148}	—	November 20, 2008	Mount Lemmon	Mount Lemmon Survey	·	2.5 km	MPC · JPL
632831	2008 WY_{152}	—	December 24, 2016	Mount Lemmon	Mount Lemmon Survey	·	1.0 km	MPC · JPL
632832	2008 WL_{158}	—	November 20, 2008	Mount Lemmon	Mount Lemmon Survey	·	1.8 km	MPC · JPL
632833	2008 WQ_{161}	—	November 30, 2008	Kitt Peak	Spacewatch	·	1.3 km	MPC · JPL
632834	2008 XD_{3}	—	December 5, 2008	Tzec Maun	E. Schwab	·	1.8 km	MPC · JPL
632835	2008 XY_{7}	—	May 21, 2006	Kitt Peak	Spacewatch	·	2.8 km	MPC · JPL
632836	2008 XM_{8}	—	November 9, 2008	Mount Lemmon	Mount Lemmon Survey	·	2.9 km	MPC · JPL
632837	2008 XE_{17}	—	September 11, 2007	Kitt Peak	Spacewatch	KOR	1.5 km	MPC · JPL
632838	2008 XP_{18}	—	December 1, 2008	Kitt Peak	Spacewatch	T_{j} (2.99) · 3:2	4.0 km	MPC · JPL
632839	2008 XS_{19}	—	December 1, 2008	Kitt Peak	Spacewatch	·	3.1 km	MPC · JPL
632840	2008 XW_{19}	—	December 1, 2008	Mount Lemmon	Mount Lemmon Survey	V	660 m	MPC · JPL
632841	2008 XY_{19}	—	December 1, 2008	Mount Lemmon	Mount Lemmon Survey	EOS	1.6 km	MPC · JPL
632842	2008 XQ_{25}	—	December 4, 2008	Mount Lemmon	Mount Lemmon Survey	·	3.0 km	MPC · JPL
632843	2008 XC_{28}	—	December 4, 2008	Mount Lemmon	Mount Lemmon Survey	·	1.7 km	MPC · JPL
632844	2008 XE_{30}	—	November 26, 2003	Kitt Peak	Spacewatch	EOS	1.8 km	MPC · JPL
632845	2008 XG_{30}	—	December 1, 2008	Catalina	CSS	·	2.4 km	MPC · JPL
632846	2008 XY_{30}	—	October 27, 2008	Kitt Peak	Spacewatch	·	2.5 km	MPC · JPL
632847	2008 XS_{38}	—	November 20, 2008	Kitt Peak	Spacewatch	·	2.8 km	MPC · JPL
632848	2008 XC_{40}	—	October 10, 1999	Kitt Peak	Spacewatch	·	1.6 km	MPC · JPL
632849	2008 XD_{42}	—	December 2, 2008	Kitt Peak	Spacewatch	·	1.9 km	MPC · JPL
632850	2008 XG_{42}	—	December 2, 2008	Kitt Peak	Spacewatch	·	1.9 km	MPC · JPL
632851	2008 XV_{46}	—	April 25, 2007	Kitt Peak	Spacewatch	H	520 m	MPC · JPL
632852	2008 XE_{56}	—	September 29, 2008	Mount Lemmon	Mount Lemmon Survey	·	1.6 km	MPC · JPL
632853	2008 XU_{57}	—	November 2, 2008	Mount Lemmon	Mount Lemmon Survey	·	2.0 km	MPC · JPL
632854	2008 XY_{57}	—	October 5, 2013	Haleakala	Pan-STARRS 1	·	2.7 km	MPC · JPL
632855	2008 XB_{58}	—	November 21, 2008	Mount Lemmon	Mount Lemmon Survey	·	1.4 km	MPC · JPL
632856	2008 XS_{61}	—	December 4, 2008	Mount Lemmon	Mount Lemmon Survey	·	3.0 km	MPC · JPL
632857	2008 XU_{63}	—	May 29, 2012	Mount Lemmon	Mount Lemmon Survey	·	2.9 km	MPC · JPL
632858	2008 XD_{64}	—	January 20, 2015	Haleakala	Pan-STARRS 1	KOR	1.0 km	MPC · JPL
632859	2008 YZ_{5}	—	December 23, 2008	Piszkéstető	K. Sárneczky	·	2.3 km	MPC · JPL
632860	2008 YD_{12}	—	November 30, 2008	Mount Lemmon	Mount Lemmon Survey	·	2.3 km	MPC · JPL
632861	2008 YV_{15}	—	June 16, 2002	Palomar	NEAT	·	1.3 km	MPC · JPL
632862	2008 YZ_{25}	—	December 27, 2008	Piszkéstető	K. Sárneczky	·	2.5 km	MPC · JPL
632863	2008 YA_{26}	—	December 27, 2008	Piszkéstető	K. Sárneczky	·	2.2 km	MPC · JPL
632864	2008 YJ_{29}	—	December 28, 2008	Farra d'Isonzo	Farra d'Isonzo	EOS	1.9 km	MPC · JPL
632865	2008 YH_{33}	—	September 18, 2007	Catalina	CSS	EOS	2.2 km	MPC · JPL
632866	2008 YV_{33}	—	December 28, 2008	Dauban	C. Rinner, Kugel, F.	·	1.2 km	MPC · JPL
632867	2008 YT_{41}	—	September 11, 2002	Palomar	NEAT	·	2.3 km	MPC · JPL
632868	2008 YC_{43}	—	December 21, 2008	Mount Lemmon	Mount Lemmon Survey	·	1.5 km	MPC · JPL
632869	2008 YR_{47}	—	May 13, 2005	Mount Lemmon	Mount Lemmon Survey	·	2.5 km	MPC · JPL
632870	2008 YY_{49}	—	October 24, 2007	Mount Lemmon	Mount Lemmon Survey	EOS	2.1 km	MPC · JPL
632871	2008 YW_{50}	—	December 29, 2008	Mount Lemmon	Mount Lemmon Survey	·	2.2 km	MPC · JPL
632872	2008 YJ_{51}	—	December 29, 2008	Mount Lemmon	Mount Lemmon Survey	EOS	1.6 km	MPC · JPL
632873	2008 YF_{56}	—	December 30, 2008	Kitt Peak	Spacewatch	·	1.1 km	MPC · JPL
632874	2008 YH_{56}	—	December 30, 2008	Kitt Peak	Spacewatch	·	1.9 km	MPC · JPL
632875	2008 YU_{57}	—	December 30, 2008	Kitt Peak	Spacewatch	EOS	1.7 km	MPC · JPL
632876	2008 YL_{58}	—	December 30, 2008	Kitt Peak	Spacewatch	EOS	1.7 km	MPC · JPL
632877	2008 YU_{58}	—	December 22, 2008	Kitt Peak	Spacewatch	·	1.1 km	MPC · JPL
632878	2008 YQ_{60}	—	December 30, 2008	Mount Lemmon	Mount Lemmon Survey	·	2.3 km	MPC · JPL
632879	2008 YK_{64}	—	December 30, 2008	Mount Lemmon	Mount Lemmon Survey	·	1.7 km	MPC · JPL
632880	2008 YR_{64}	—	December 22, 2008	Mount Lemmon	Mount Lemmon Survey	EOS	2.0 km	MPC · JPL
632881	2008 YV_{67}	—	December 30, 2008	Mount Lemmon	Mount Lemmon Survey	·	2.2 km	MPC · JPL
632882	2008 YG_{69}	—	December 25, 2008	Lulin	LUSS	·	1.7 km	MPC · JPL
632883	2008 YN_{69}	—	December 29, 2008	Kitt Peak	Spacewatch	·	1.3 km	MPC · JPL
632884	2008 YK_{71}	—	October 20, 2003	Kitt Peak	Spacewatch	·	1.6 km	MPC · JPL
632885	2008 YE_{72}	—	December 6, 2008	Kitt Peak	Spacewatch	EOS	2.0 km	MPC · JPL
632886	2008 YC_{74}	—	December 30, 2008	Kitt Peak	Spacewatch	·	1.0 km	MPC · JPL
632887	2008 YA_{75}	—	December 30, 2008	Mount Lemmon	Mount Lemmon Survey	·	2.1 km	MPC · JPL
632888	2008 YB_{75}	—	December 30, 2008	Mount Lemmon	Mount Lemmon Survey	·	870 m	MPC · JPL
632889	2008 YR_{77}	—	December 30, 2008	Mount Lemmon	Mount Lemmon Survey	·	910 m	MPC · JPL
632890	2008 YU_{77}	—	December 30, 2008	Mount Lemmon	Mount Lemmon Survey	·	3.2 km	MPC · JPL
632891	2008 YK_{78}	—	December 30, 2008	Mount Lemmon	Mount Lemmon Survey	·	2.2 km	MPC · JPL
632892	2008 YL_{79}	—	December 30, 2008	Mount Lemmon	Mount Lemmon Survey	VER	2.4 km	MPC · JPL
632893	2008 YK_{82}	—	December 31, 2008	Kitt Peak	Spacewatch	·	2.1 km	MPC · JPL
632894	2008 YX_{83}	—	December 21, 2008	Kitt Peak	Spacewatch	·	1.0 km	MPC · JPL
632895	2008 YE_{87}	—	December 29, 2008	Kitt Peak	Spacewatch	VER	2.3 km	MPC · JPL
632896	2008 YO_{88}	—	December 29, 2008	Kitt Peak	Spacewatch	·	1.6 km	MPC · JPL
632897	2008 YR_{89}	—	December 29, 2008	Kitt Peak	Spacewatch	·	1.4 km	MPC · JPL
632898	2008 YE_{91}	—	January 8, 2006	Mount Lemmon	Mount Lemmon Survey	·	790 m	MPC · JPL
632899	2008 YH_{91}	—	December 21, 2008	Kitt Peak	Spacewatch	·	2.2 km	MPC · JPL
632900	2008 YP_{104}	—	December 29, 2008	Kitt Peak	Spacewatch	·	1.6 km	MPC · JPL

== 632901–633000 ==
back to top

Designation			Discovery			Properties		Ref
Permanent	Provisional	Named after	Date	Site	Discoverer(s)	Category	Diam.	Ref
632901	2008 YA_{105}	—	February 13, 2004	Kitt Peak	Spacewatch	EOS	1.9 km	MPC · JPL
632902	2008 YJ_{107}	—	September 10, 2007	Kitt Peak	Spacewatch	·	2.1 km	MPC · JPL
632903	2008 YP_{114}	—	November 1, 2008	Mount Lemmon	Mount Lemmon Survey	EOS	2.4 km	MPC · JPL
632904	2008 YZ_{114}	—	December 29, 2008	Kitt Peak	Spacewatch	·	2.8 km	MPC · JPL
632905	2008 YM_{115}	—	December 29, 2008	Kitt Peak	Spacewatch	·	3.0 km	MPC · JPL
632906	2008 YQ_{121}	—	December 30, 2008	Kitt Peak	Spacewatch	·	1.0 km	MPC · JPL
632907	2008 YE_{123}	—	May 30, 2006	Mount Lemmon	Mount Lemmon Survey	·	2.9 km	MPC · JPL
632908	2008 YO_{124}	—	September 14, 2007	Kitt Peak	Spacewatch	·	1.0 km	MPC · JPL
632909	2008 YG_{126}	—	December 30, 2008	Kitt Peak	Spacewatch	·	2.0 km	MPC · JPL
632910	2008 YS_{129}	—	December 4, 2008	Mount Lemmon	Mount Lemmon Survey	·	940 m	MPC · JPL
632911	2008 YQ_{135}	—	November 19, 2008	Mount Lemmon	Mount Lemmon Survey	·	1.6 km	MPC · JPL
632912	2008 YU_{135}	—	December 30, 2008	Kitt Peak	Spacewatch	·	2.5 km	MPC · JPL
632913	2008 YE_{136}	—	December 30, 2008	Kitt Peak	Spacewatch	·	2.2 km	MPC · JPL
632914	2008 YM_{136}	—	December 30, 2008	Kitt Peak	Spacewatch	·	1.1 km	MPC · JPL
632915	2008 YL_{138}	—	December 22, 2008	Mount Lemmon	Mount Lemmon Survey	·	1.5 km	MPC · JPL
632916	2008 YR_{142}	—	November 21, 2008	Mount Lemmon	Mount Lemmon Survey	·	2.2 km	MPC · JPL
632917	2008 YR_{144}	—	December 30, 2008	Kitt Peak	Spacewatch	·	3.3 km	MPC · JPL
632918	2008 YR_{145}	—	December 30, 2008	Kitt Peak	Spacewatch	·	2.9 km	MPC · JPL
632919	2008 YT_{148}	—	December 26, 2008	Nyukasa	Nyukasa	·	1.1 km	MPC · JPL
632920	2008 YD_{152}	—	December 22, 2008	Kitt Peak	Spacewatch	·	2.6 km	MPC · JPL
632921	2008 YK_{152}	—	December 29, 2008	Kitt Peak	Spacewatch	·	1.0 km	MPC · JPL
632922	2008 YR_{154}	—	December 22, 2008	Kitt Peak	Spacewatch	·	3.1 km	MPC · JPL
632923	2008 YW_{164}	—	October 3, 2008	Mount Lemmon	Mount Lemmon Survey	·	2.2 km	MPC · JPL
632924	2008 YK_{167}	—	December 22, 2003	Kitt Peak	Spacewatch	EOS	2.5 km	MPC · JPL
632925	2008 YM_{169}	—	December 30, 2008	Mount Lemmon	Mount Lemmon Survey	·	2.4 km	MPC · JPL
632926	2008 YM_{172}	—	January 17, 2004	Palomar	NEAT	·	2.4 km	MPC · JPL
632927	2008 YY_{173}	—	January 21, 2015	Haleakala	Pan-STARRS 1	EOS	2.0 km	MPC · JPL
632928	2008 YE_{176}	—	December 30, 2008	Mount Lemmon	Mount Lemmon Survey	·	640 m	MPC · JPL
632929	2008 YP_{176}	—	August 10, 2012	Kitt Peak	Spacewatch	EOS	1.7 km	MPC · JPL
632930	2008 YA_{177}	—	December 22, 2008	Mount Lemmon	Mount Lemmon Survey	·	1.4 km	MPC · JPL
632931	2008 YH_{177}	—	December 22, 2008	Mount Lemmon	Mount Lemmon Survey	EOS	1.8 km	MPC · JPL
632932	2008 YB_{182}	—	December 22, 2008	Kitt Peak	Spacewatch	·	2.0 km	MPC · JPL
632933	2008 YC_{182}	—	October 25, 2013	Mount Lemmon	Mount Lemmon Survey	·	1.5 km	MPC · JPL
632934	2008 YF_{182}	—	October 26, 2013	Mount Lemmon	Mount Lemmon Survey	·	1.5 km	MPC · JPL
632935	2008 YK_{182}	—	December 21, 2008	Kitt Peak	Spacewatch	·	2.4 km	MPC · JPL
632936	2008 YE_{183}	—	December 31, 2008	Kitt Peak	Spacewatch	·	3.1 km	MPC · JPL
632937	2008 YU_{187}	—	December 29, 2008	Kitt Peak	Spacewatch	EOS	2.1 km	MPC · JPL
632938	2008 YV_{187}	—	December 31, 2008	Kitt Peak	Spacewatch	·	2.3 km	MPC · JPL
632939	2008 YW_{187}	—	December 21, 2008	Mount Lemmon	Mount Lemmon Survey	·	2.1 km	MPC · JPL
632940	2008 YX_{187}	—	December 30, 2008	Kitt Peak	Spacewatch	·	1.2 km	MPC · JPL
632941	2008 YY_{187}	—	December 22, 2008	Kitt Peak	Spacewatch	·	1.3 km	MPC · JPL
632942	2008 YG_{191}	—	December 22, 2008	Kitt Peak	Spacewatch	EOS	1.8 km	MPC · JPL
632943	2008 YA_{192}	—	December 29, 2008	Kitt Peak	Spacewatch	EOS	1.5 km	MPC · JPL
632944	2008 YN_{196}	—	December 22, 2008	Kitt Peak	Spacewatch	·	940 m	MPC · JPL
632945	2009 AP_{2}	—	February 10, 2002	Socorro	LINEAR	V	670 m	MPC · JPL
632946	2009 AY_{9}	—	September 11, 2007	Mount Lemmon	Mount Lemmon Survey	·	910 m	MPC · JPL
632947	2009 AL_{10}	—	October 14, 2007	Kitt Peak	Spacewatch	·	2.6 km	MPC · JPL
632948	2009 AY_{10}	—	January 2, 2009	Mount Lemmon	Mount Lemmon Survey	EOS	1.8 km	MPC · JPL
632949	2009 AK_{11}	—	September 19, 2003	Campo Imperatore	CINEOS	·	1.3 km	MPC · JPL
632950	2009 AW_{12}	—	January 2, 2009	Mount Lemmon	Mount Lemmon Survey	·	3.7 km	MPC · JPL
632951	2009 AU_{35}	—	December 31, 2008	Mount Lemmon	Mount Lemmon Survey	·	3.3 km	MPC · JPL
632952	2009 AH_{37}	—	December 21, 2008	Mount Lemmon	Mount Lemmon Survey	·	2.1 km	MPC · JPL
632953	2009 AV_{40}	—	January 15, 2009	Kitt Peak	Spacewatch	·	1.3 km	MPC · JPL
632954	2009 AM_{48}	—	October 8, 2007	Mount Lemmon	Mount Lemmon Survey	·	2.7 km	MPC · JPL
632955	2009 AX_{52}	—	January 1, 2009	Kitt Peak	Spacewatch	·	2.6 km	MPC · JPL
632956	2009 AJ_{53}	—	January 3, 2009	Mount Lemmon	Mount Lemmon Survey	·	2.6 km	MPC · JPL
632957	2009 AL_{53}	—	October 10, 2012	Mount Lemmon	Mount Lemmon Survey	·	2.2 km	MPC · JPL
632958	2009 AN_{53}	—	January 1, 2009	Kitt Peak	Spacewatch	EOS	1.6 km	MPC · JPL
632959	2009 AC_{55}	—	August 24, 2012	Kitt Peak	Spacewatch	EOS	2.0 km	MPC · JPL
632960	2009 AF_{55}	—	November 6, 2013	Haleakala	Pan-STARRS 1	·	1.6 km	MPC · JPL
632961	2009 AV_{55}	—	June 24, 2017	Haleakala	Pan-STARRS 1	·	1.5 km	MPC · JPL
632962	2009 AC_{56}	—	June 25, 2017	Haleakala	Pan-STARRS 1	EOS	1.7 km	MPC · JPL
632963	2009 AE_{56}	—	January 1, 2009	Mount Lemmon	Mount Lemmon Survey	EOS	1.6 km	MPC · JPL
632964	2009 AP_{56}	—	January 22, 2015	Haleakala	Pan-STARRS 1	·	1.6 km	MPC · JPL
632965	2009 AJ_{58}	—	January 1, 2009	Mount Lemmon	Mount Lemmon Survey	·	2.7 km	MPC · JPL
632966	2009 AK_{58}	—	January 25, 2015	Haleakala	Pan-STARRS 1	·	2.6 km	MPC · JPL
632967	2009 AG_{59}	—	December 22, 2008	Mount Lemmon	Mount Lemmon Survey	·	2.2 km	MPC · JPL
632968	2009 AJ_{59}	—	January 2, 2009	Kitt Peak	Spacewatch	·	2.4 km	MPC · JPL
632969	2009 AN_{60}	—	January 2, 2009	Mount Lemmon	Mount Lemmon Survey	·	1.1 km	MPC · JPL
632970	2009 AQ_{61}	—	January 3, 2009	Kitt Peak	Spacewatch	·	1.3 km	MPC · JPL
632971	2009 AB_{65}	—	January 2, 2009	Kitt Peak	Spacewatch	·	2.2 km	MPC · JPL
632972	2009 BH_{12}	—	January 16, 2009	Mount Lemmon	Mount Lemmon Survey	·	2.2 km	MPC · JPL
632973	2009 BL_{12}	—	January 25, 2009	Wildberg	R. Apitzsch	EOS	1.7 km	MPC · JPL
632974	2009 BG_{13}	—	January 7, 2009	Kitt Peak	Spacewatch	LIX	3.1 km	MPC · JPL
632975	2009 BF_{20}	—	January 16, 2009	Mount Lemmon	Mount Lemmon Survey	EOS	1.9 km	MPC · JPL
632976	2009 BK_{21}	—	January 16, 2009	Mount Lemmon	Mount Lemmon Survey	·	960 m	MPC · JPL
632977	2009 BX_{24}	—	January 17, 2009	Kitt Peak	Spacewatch	·	3.4 km	MPC · JPL
632978	2009 BQ_{36}	—	January 16, 2009	Kitt Peak	Spacewatch	·	970 m	MPC · JPL
632979	2009 BQ_{41}	—	January 16, 2009	Kitt Peak	Spacewatch	·	2.0 km	MPC · JPL
632980	2009 BF_{49}	—	January 16, 2009	Mount Lemmon	Mount Lemmon Survey	TRE	1.8 km	MPC · JPL
632981	2009 BH_{50}	—	January 16, 2009	Mount Lemmon	Mount Lemmon Survey	·	2.9 km	MPC · JPL
632982	2009 BB_{54}	—	February 2, 2005	Kitt Peak	Spacewatch	·	900 m	MPC · JPL
632983	2009 BH_{54}	—	January 16, 2009	Mount Lemmon	Mount Lemmon Survey	·	2.1 km	MPC · JPL
632984	2009 BW_{55}	—	January 17, 2009	Mount Lemmon	Mount Lemmon Survey	·	2.3 km	MPC · JPL
632985	2009 BJ_{59}	—	December 22, 2008	Kitt Peak	Spacewatch	·	960 m	MPC · JPL
632986	2009 BQ_{60}	—	January 17, 2009	Mount Lemmon	Mount Lemmon Survey	·	1.3 km	MPC · JPL
632987	2009 BT_{72}	—	January 29, 2009	Dauban	C. Rinner, Kugel, F.	·	700 m	MPC · JPL
632988	2009 BH_{78}	—	January 18, 2009	Kitt Peak	Spacewatch	·	1.0 km	MPC · JPL
632989	2009 BX_{78}	—	January 30, 2009	Vallemare Borbona	V. S. Casulli	·	1.6 km	MPC · JPL
632990	2009 BJ_{92}	—	January 25, 2009	Kitt Peak	Spacewatch	·	1.1 km	MPC · JPL
632991	2009 BB_{94}	—	January 25, 2009	Kitt Peak	Spacewatch	·	2.9 km	MPC · JPL
632992	2009 BA_{101}	—	May 16, 1999	Kitt Peak	Spacewatch	EOS	2.1 km	MPC · JPL
632993	2009 BR_{102}	—	October 22, 2003	Kitt Peak	Spacewatch	·	1.4 km	MPC · JPL
632994	2009 BJ_{116}	—	November 3, 2007	Mount Lemmon	Mount Lemmon Survey	·	2.7 km	MPC · JPL
632995	2009 BW_{117}	—	September 19, 2007	Kitt Peak	Spacewatch	·	1.1 km	MPC · JPL
632996	2009 BT_{119}	—	November 11, 2001	Apache Point	SDSS Collaboration	·	540 m	MPC · JPL
632997	2009 BD_{120}	—	January 30, 2009	Mount Lemmon	Mount Lemmon Survey	·	2.2 km	MPC · JPL
632998	2009 BP_{121}	—	January 31, 2009	Kitt Peak	Spacewatch	·	1.1 km	MPC · JPL
632999	2009 BP_{124}	—	September 20, 2003	Kitt Peak	Spacewatch	·	1.2 km	MPC · JPL
633000	2009 BS_{130}	—	January 31, 2009	Mount Lemmon	Mount Lemmon Survey	·	1.5 km	MPC · JPL

back to top

== Meaning of names ==
As minor planet discoveries are confirmed, they are given a permanent number by the IAU's Minor Planet Center (MPC), and the discoverers can then submit names for them, following the IAU's naming conventions. The list below concerns those minor planets in the specified number-range that have received names, and explains the meanings of those names.

Official naming citations of newly named small Solar System bodies are approved and published in a bulletin by IAU's Working Group for Small Bodies Nomenclature (WGSBN). Before May 2021, citations were published in MPC's Minor Planet Circulars for many decades. Recent citations can also be found on the JPL Small-Body Database (SBDB). Until his death in 2016, German astronomer Lutz D. Schmadel compiled these citations into the Dictionary of Minor Planet Names (DMP) and regularly updated the collection.

Based on Paul Herget's The Names of the Minor Planets, Schmadel also researched the unclear origin of numerous asteroids, most of which had been named prior to World War II. This article incorporates text from this source, which is in the public domain: SBDB New namings may only be added to this list below after official publication as the preannouncement of names is condemned. The WGSBN publishes a comprehensive guideline for the naming rules of non-cometary small Solar System bodies.

Named minor planet	Provisional	This minor planet was named for...	Ref · Catalog
632484 Pamelagay	2008 KQ_{11}	Pamela Gay, American astronomer.	IAU · 632484
