= List of minor planets: 875001–876000 =

The following is a partial list of minor planets, running from minor-planet number 875001 through 876000, inclusive. The primary data for this and other partial lists is based on JPL's "Small-Body Orbital Elements" and data available from the Minor Planet Center. Critical list information is also provided by the MPC, unless otherwise specified from Lowell Observatory. A detailed description of the table's columns and additional sources are given on the main page including a complete list of every page in this series, and a statistical break-up on the dynamical classification of minor planets.

Also see the summary list of all named bodies in numerical and alphabetical order, and the corresponding naming citations for the number range of this particular list. New namings may only be added to this list after official publication, as the preannouncement of names is condemned by the Working Group for Small Bodies Nomenclature of the International Astronomical Union.

Near-Earth obj.	MBA (inner)	MBA (outer)	Centaur
Mars-crosser	MBA (middle)	Jupiter trojan	Trans-Neptunian obj.
Unclassified

== 875001–875100 ==
Designation			Discovery			Properties		Ref
Permanent	Provisional	Named after	Date	Site	Discoverer(s)	Category	Diam.	Ref
875001	2022 KM_{16}	—	May 22, 2022	Mount Lemmon	Mount Lemmon Survey	·	1.6 km	MPC · JPL
875002	2022 KC_{28}	—	March 12, 2014	Kitt Peak	Spacewatch	·	810 m	MPC · JPL
875003	2022 KL_{33}	—	May 27, 2022	Haleakala	Pan-STARRS 2	L5	6.7 km	MPC · JPL
875004	2022 KZ_{38}	—	May 24, 2022	Haleakala	Pan-STARRS 2	H	380 m	MPC · JPL
875005	2022 LQ	—	August 26, 2017	Haleakala	Pan-STARRS 1	H	360 m	MPC · JPL
875006	2022 MS_{1}	—	June 20, 2022	Mount Lemmon	Mount Lemmon Survey	APO	220 m	MPC · JPL
875007	2022 MR_{2}	—	August 19, 2020	Mount Lemmon	Mount Lemmon Survey	H	330 m	MPC · JPL
875008	2022 MR_{4}	—	June 24, 2022	Haleakala	Pan-STARRS 2	H	370 m	MPC · JPL
875009	2022 NQ_{2}	—	July 5, 2022	Haleakala	Pan-STARRS 2	L5	5.3 km	MPC · JPL
875010	2022 NB_{16}	—	July 5, 2022	Haleakala	Pan-STARRS 2	L5	5.6 km	MPC · JPL
875011	2022 OX_{15}	—	July 28, 2022	Haleakala	Pan-STARRS 2	·	410 m	MPC · JPL
875012	2022 OX_{16}	—	August 24, 2011	Haleakala	Pan-STARRS 1	·	2.2 km	MPC · JPL
875013	2022 OF_{17}	—	July 21, 2022	Haleakala	Pan-STARRS 2	L5	6.7 km	MPC · JPL
875014	2022 OD_{25}	—	July 28, 2022	Haleakala	Pan-STARRS 2	L5	6.4 km	MPC · JPL
875015	2022 OA_{35}	—	May 20, 2015	Cerro Tololo	DECam	·	1.7 km	MPC · JPL
875016	2022 OW_{77}	—	July 26, 2022	Haleakala	Pan-STARRS 2	·	1.1 km	MPC · JPL
875017	2022 PO_{2}	—	July 30, 2014	Haleakala	Pan-STARRS 1	H	350 m	MPC · JPL
875018	2022 PR_{12}	—	April 18, 2015	Cerro Tololo	DECam	·	2.0 km	MPC · JPL
875019	2022 PJ_{40}	—	November 27, 2014	Mount Lemmon	Mount Lemmon Survey	L5	6.5 km	MPC · JPL
875020	2022 QC_{37}	—	December 16, 2020	Mount Lemmon	Mount Lemmon Survey	·	700 m	MPC · JPL
875021	2022 QL_{49}	—	September 7, 2008	Mount Lemmon	Mount Lemmon Survey	NYS	540 m	MPC · JPL
875022	2022 QR_{69}	—	September 27, 2017	Haleakala	Pan-STARRS 1	·	2.2 km	MPC · JPL
875023	2022 QW_{97}	—	August 26, 2022	Haleakala	Pan-STARRS 1	·	1.0 km	MPC · JPL
875024	2022 QJ_{116}	—	October 11, 2012	Mount Lemmon	Mount Lemmon Survey	EOS	1.1 km	MPC · JPL
875025	2022 QN_{125}	—	October 14, 2012	ESA OGS	ESA OGS	·	1.1 km	MPC · JPL
875026	2022 QB_{127}	—	August 3, 2016	Haleakala	Pan-STARRS 1	·	2.2 km	MPC · JPL
875027	2022 QP_{144}	—	October 9, 2005	Kitt Peak	Spacewatch	·	2.2 km	MPC · JPL
875028	2022 RZ_{10}	—	August 31, 2011	Haleakala	Pan-STARRS 1	·	1.8 km	MPC · JPL
875029	2022 RW_{53}	—	April 25, 2015	Haleakala	Pan-STARRS 1	·	500 m	MPC · JPL
875030	2022 SF_{18}	—	May 16, 2005	Mount Lemmon	Mount Lemmon Survey	·	480 m	MPC · JPL
875031	2022 SP_{45}	—	September 12, 2007	Kitt Peak	Spacewatch	·	650 m	MPC · JPL
875032	2022 SD_{51}	—	June 5, 2016	Haleakala	Pan-STARRS 1	·	1.4 km	MPC · JPL
875033	2022 SJ_{52}	—	October 30, 2005	Mount Lemmon	Mount Lemmon Survey	·	400 m	MPC · JPL
875034	2022 SZ_{60}	—	March 23, 2012	Mount Lemmon	Mount Lemmon Survey	·	810 m	MPC · JPL
875035	2022 SH_{62}	—	December 6, 2019	Mount Lemmon	Mount Lemmon Survey	·	440 m	MPC · JPL
875036	2022 SV_{88}	—	June 14, 2012	Mount Lemmon	Mount Lemmon Survey	·	440 m	MPC · JPL
875037	2022 SM_{105}	—	November 10, 2009	Mount Lemmon	Mount Lemmon Survey	·	2.5 km	MPC · JPL
875038	2022 SP_{112}	—	September 27, 2022	Haleakala	Pan-STARRS 1	·	430 m	MPC · JPL
875039	2022 SY_{123}	—	February 14, 2013	Mount Lemmon	Mount Lemmon Survey	·	2.0 km	MPC · JPL
875040	2022 SN_{133}	—	April 19, 2012	Mount Lemmon	Mount Lemmon Survey	·	580 m	MPC · JPL
875041	2022 SS_{157}	—	November 10, 2016	Haleakala	Pan-STARRS 1	·	680 m	MPC · JPL
875042	2022 SV_{157}	—	September 23, 2022	Haleakala	Pan-STARRS 1	·	460 m	MPC · JPL
875043	2022 SA_{186}	—	September 2, 2011	Haleakala	Pan-STARRS 1	·	1.5 km	MPC · JPL
875044	2022 SM_{199}	—	November 21, 2014	Haleakala	Pan-STARRS 1	H	350 m	MPC · JPL
875045	2022 SL_{236}	—	October 3, 2013	Haleakala	Pan-STARRS 1	·	1.3 km	MPC · JPL
875046	2022 SL_{289}	—	April 29, 2014	Haleakala	Pan-STARRS 1	·	440 m	MPC · JPL
875047	2022 UZ_{3}	—	October 17, 2022	Haleakala	Pan-STARRS 1	AMO	350 m	MPC · JPL
875048	2022 UD_{30}	—	September 22, 2012	Kitt Peak	Spacewatch	·	460 m	MPC · JPL
875049	2022 UT_{32}	—	September 22, 2009	Kitt Peak	Spacewatch	·	490 m	MPC · JPL
875050	2022 UU_{41}	—	October 17, 2022	Mount Lemmon	Mount Lemmon Survey	PHO	670 m	MPC · JPL
875051	2022 UR_{49}	—	October 2, 2013	Haleakala	Pan-STARRS 1	LEO	1.3 km	MPC · JPL
875052	2022 UB_{74}	—	August 9, 2015	Haleakala	Pan-STARRS 1	·	460 m	MPC · JPL
875053	2022 UJ_{78}	—	August 31, 2017	Haleakala	Pan-STARRS 1	·	1.3 km	MPC · JPL
875054	2022 UG_{173}	—	September 9, 2015	Haleakala	Pan-STARRS 1	·	540 m	MPC · JPL
875055	2022 VD_{9}	—	November 7, 2018	Mount Lemmon	Mount Lemmon Survey	·	940 m	MPC · JPL
875056	2022 WY_{5}	—	November 23, 2022	Haleakala	Pan-STARRS 1	AMO	170 m	MPC · JPL
875057	2022 XF_{6}	—	October 20, 2018	Mount Lemmon	Mount Lemmon Survey	NYS	580 m	MPC · JPL
875058	2022 YD_{7}	—	December 21, 2008	Catalina	CSS	·	600 m	MPC · JPL
875059	2023 BE_{14}	—	February 10, 2010	WISE	WISE	KRM	1.4 km	MPC · JPL
875060	2023 BB_{15}	—	November 8, 2021	Mount Lemmon	Mount Lemmon Survey	·	1.5 km	MPC · JPL
875061	2023 BG_{19}	—	January 22, 2023	Haleakala	Pan-STARRS 2	·	2.0 km	MPC · JPL
875062	2023 CR_{5}	—	January 27, 2012	Kitt Peak	Spacewatch	EOS	1.3 km	MPC · JPL
875063	2023 CC_{7}	—	February 12, 2023	Kitt Peak-Bok	Bok NEO Survey	·	2.8 km	MPC · JPL
875064	2023 CG_{7}	—	March 17, 2012	Mount Lemmon	Mount Lemmon Survey	·	1.9 km	MPC · JPL
875065	2023 CR_{7}	—	August 15, 2020	Haleakala	Pan-STARRS 1	·	1.9 km	MPC · JPL
875066	2023 EU_{2}	—	September 13, 2013	Kitt Peak	Spacewatch	PHO	800 m	MPC · JPL
875067	2023 EH_{4}	—	March 11, 2014	Mount Lemmon	Mount Lemmon Survey	EUN	960 m	MPC · JPL
875068	2023 EX_{7}	—	April 23, 2014	Cerro Tololo	DECam	·	1.2 km	MPC · JPL
875069	2023 EK_{10}	—	January 29, 2011	Mount Lemmon	Mount Lemmon Survey	NYS	910 m	MPC · JPL
875070	2023 EJ_{16}	—	September 16, 2020	Haleakala	Pan-STARRS 1	·	1.9 km	MPC · JPL
875071	2023 FX_{6}	—	July 25, 2019	Haleakala	Pan-STARRS 1	·	2.0 km	MPC · JPL
875072	2023 FU_{7}	—	May 15, 2013	Haleakala	Pan-STARRS 1	·	1.2 km	MPC · JPL
875073	2023 FJ_{28}	—	March 31, 2023	Haleakala	Pan-STARRS 1	·	780 m	MPC · JPL
875074	2023 FQ_{53}	—	February 8, 2011	Mount Lemmon	Mount Lemmon Survey	·	2.1 km	MPC · JPL
875075	2023 FV_{61}	—	August 3, 2014	Haleakala	Pan-STARRS 1	·	1.8 km	MPC · JPL
875076	2023 FO_{62}	—	August 16, 2020	Haleakala	Pan-STARRS 1	·	1.3 km	MPC · JPL
875077	2023 HU_{14}	—	April 17, 2023	Haleakala	Pan-STARRS 2	·	1.5 km	MPC · JPL
875078	2023 HK_{24}	—	April 24, 2023	Haleakala	Pan-STARRS 2	·	2.1 km	MPC · JPL
875079	2023 JB_{25}	—	September 9, 2007	Kitt Peak	Spacewatch	·	2.1 km	MPC · JPL
875080	2023 MP_{19}	—	April 19, 2020	Haleakala	Pan-STARRS 1	L5	5.6 km	MPC · JPL
875081	2023 OK_{6}	—	December 9, 2015	Haleakala	Pan-STARRS 1	L5	6.7 km	MPC · JPL
875082	2023 OT_{6}	—	December 7, 2005	Kitt Peak	Spacewatch	·	830 m	MPC · JPL
875083	2023 OM_{11}	—	December 23, 2016	Haleakala	Pan-STARRS 1	L5	6.8 km	MPC · JPL
875084	2023 OV_{16}	—	July 23, 2023	Haleakala	Pan-STARRS 1	L5	7.3 km	MPC · JPL
875085	2023 OP_{51}	—	April 5, 2019	Haleakala	Pan-STARRS 1	L5	6.7 km	MPC · JPL
875086	2023 QV_{58}	—	August 18, 2023	Haleakala	Pan-STARRS 1	L5	7.1 km	MPC · JPL
875087	2023 QP_{80}	—	October 1, 2016	Kitt Peak	Spacewatch	·	440 m	MPC · JPL
875088	2023 QN_{120}	—	May 20, 2020	Haleakala	Pan-STARRS 1	L5	4.8 km	MPC · JPL
875089	2023 RE_{36}	—	November 21, 2014	Mount Lemmon	Mount Lemmon Survey	L5	6.9 km	MPC · JPL
875090	2023 RJ_{51}	—	October 31, 2010	Mount Lemmon	Mount Lemmon Survey	·	450 m	MPC · JPL
875091	2023 RU_{78}	—	March 20, 2021	Mount Lemmon	Mount Lemmon Survey	·	1.6 km	MPC · JPL
875092	2023 RF_{93}	—	August 3, 2016	Haleakala	Pan-STARRS 1	·	2.6 km	MPC · JPL
875093	2023 RC_{106}	—	April 16, 2020	Mount Lemmon	Mount Lemmon Survey	L5	6.0 km	MPC · JPL
875094	2023 SR_{8}	—	January 2, 2011	Mount Lemmon	Mount Lemmon Survey	·	440 m	MPC · JPL
875095	2023 SY_{20}	—	January 11, 2011	Mount Lemmon	Mount Lemmon Survey	·	460 m	MPC · JPL
875096	2023 SB_{91}	—	March 2, 2006	Kitt Peak	Spacewatch	·	1.4 km	MPC · JPL
875097	2023 TH_{87}	—	October 25, 2011	Haleakala	Pan-STARRS 1	·	610 m	MPC · JPL
875098	2023 TQ_{175}	—	October 9, 2023	Haleakala	Pan-STARRS 2	·	1.6 km	MPC · JPL
875099	2023 UH_{27}	—	November 18, 2015	Haleakala	Pan-STARRS 1	H	340 m	MPC · JPL
875100	2023 VO_{27}	—	October 5, 2013	Haleakala	Pan-STARRS 1	·	470 m	MPC · JPL

== 875101–875200 ==
back to top

Designation			Discovery			Properties		Ref
Permanent	Provisional	Named after	Date	Site	Discoverer(s)	Category	Diam.	Ref
875101	2024 AJ_{4}	—	July 27, 2011	Haleakala	Pan-STARRS 1	H	390 m	MPC · JPL
875102	2024 EK_{2}	—	January 22, 2013	Mount Lemmon	Mount Lemmon Survey	H	330 m	MPC · JPL
875103	2024 EH_{6}	—	March 11, 2024	Mount Lemmon	Mount Lemmon Survey	·	590 m	MPC · JPL
875104	2024 FZ_{5}	—	March 19, 2024	Haleakala	Pan-STARRS 2	·	1.6 km	MPC · JPL
875105	2024 GV_{7}	—	July 4, 2014	Haleakala	Pan-STARRS 1	·	1.7 km	MPC · JPL
875106	2024 GZ_{10}	—	April 12, 2024	Mount Lemmon	Mount Lemmon Survey	·	1.1 km	MPC · JPL
875107	2024 GW_{12}	—	April 4, 2024	Mount Lemmon	Mount Lemmon Survey	·	1.6 km	MPC · JPL
875108	2024 GZ_{16}	—	April 4, 2024	Mount Lemmon	Mount Lemmon Survey	·	1.5 km	MPC · JPL
875109	2024 HW_{8}	—	April 19, 2024	Haleakala	Pan-STARRS 1	·	1.9 km	MPC · JPL
875110	2024 HA_{9}	—	April 18, 2024	Haleakala	Pan-STARRS 1	·	880 m	MPC · JPL
875111	2024 HY_{11}	—	August 28, 2014	Haleakala	Pan-STARRS 1	·	2.0 km	MPC · JPL
875112	2024 HX_{18}	—	August 20, 2014	Haleakala	Pan-STARRS 1	·	2.0 km	MPC · JPL
875113	2024 JG_{16}	—	September 18, 2014	Haleakala	Pan-STARRS 1	·	1.7 km	MPC · JPL
875114	2024 JX_{28}	—	August 3, 2014	Haleakala	Pan-STARRS 1	·	2.0 km	MPC · JPL
875115	2024 JA_{40}	—	July 18, 2020	Haleakala	Pan-STARRS 1	·	1.2 km	MPC · JPL
875116	2024 JE_{41}	—	June 4, 2019	Cerro Tololo-DECam	DECam	·	1.3 km	MPC · JPL
875117	2024 KY_{5}	—	November 23, 2014	Haleakala	Pan-STARRS 1	·	2.3 km	MPC · JPL
875118	2024 NN_{4}	—	December 6, 2015	Haleakala	Pan-STARRS 1	L5	6.1 km	MPC · JPL
875119	2024 NC_{10}	—	November 17, 2014	Haleakala	Pan-STARRS 1	L5	5.9 km	MPC · JPL
875120	2024 OM_{2}	—	July 24, 2015	Haleakala	Pan-STARRS 1	·	1.3 km	MPC · JPL
875121	2024 OS_{16}	—	January 2, 2017	Haleakala	Pan-STARRS 1	L5	7.3 km	MPC · JPL
875122	2024 PE_{7}	—	January 14, 2018	Haleakala	Pan-STARRS 1	·	1.5 km	MPC · JPL
875123	2024 PB_{12}	—	August 1, 2024	Haleakala	Pan-STARRS 2	L5	6.8 km	MPC · JPL
875124	2024 PV_{24}	—	August 8, 2024	Haleakala	Pan-STARRS 2	L5	5.7 km	MPC · JPL
875125	2024 RS_{46}	—	November 27, 2014	Haleakala	Pan-STARRS 1	L5	6.9 km	MPC · JPL
875126	2024 RB_{92}	—	May 31, 2021	Haleakala	Pan-STARRS 1	L5	5.6 km	MPC · JPL
875127	2024 RX_{96}	—	November 17, 2009	Kitt Peak	Spacewatch	3:2	4.0 km	MPC · JPL
875128	2024 RQ_{144}	—	September 29, 2011	Kitt Peak	Spacewatch	·	900 m	MPC · JPL
875129 Abbeyridgeobs	2024 SM_{9}	Abbeyridgeobs	September 24, 2024	Roque de los Muchachos	Romanov, F. D.	·	780 m	MPC · JPL
875130	2024 SY_{24}	—	November 27, 2013	Haleakala	Pan-STARRS 1	·	1.7 km	MPC · JPL
875131	2024 SD_{44}	—	August 15, 2013	Haleakala	Pan-STARRS 1	·	620 m	MPC · JPL
875132	2024 SN_{78}	—	September 24, 2024	Mount Lemmon	Mount Lemmon Survey	L5	5.8 km	MPC · JPL
875133	2024 TE_{23}	—	January 27, 2015	Haleakala	Pan-STARRS 1	·	2.0 km	MPC · JPL
875134	2024 US_{36}	—	October 24, 2024	Mount Lemmon	Mount Lemmon Survey	·	970 m	MPC · JPL
875135	2024 UF_{55}	—	October 26, 2024	Mount Lemmon	Mount Lemmon Survey	·	1.0 km	MPC · JPL
875136	2024 WL_{34}	—	March 29, 2016	Cerro Tololo-DECam	DECam	·	1.4 km	MPC · JPL
875137	2024 XG_{26}	—	December 1, 2016	Mount Lemmon	Mount Lemmon Survey	·	960 m	MPC · JPL
875138	2024 YP_{23}	—	November 9, 2008	Kitt Peak	Spacewatch	·	1.0 km	MPC · JPL
875139	2024 YX_{33}	—	November 6, 2016	Haleakala	Pan-STARRS 1	H	310 m	MPC · JPL
875140	2024 YR_{35}	—	February 9, 2008	Kitt Peak	Spacewatch	·	1.6 km	MPC · JPL
875141	2024 YP_{48}	—	December 11, 2010	Mount Lemmon	Mount Lemmon Survey	L4	6.2 km	MPC · JPL
875142	2025 BP_{8}	—	January 11, 2008	Kitt Peak	Spacewatch	·	2.2 km	MPC · JPL
875143	2025 CU_{13}	—	April 5, 2016	Haleakala	Pan-STARRS 1	·	1.2 km	MPC · JPL
875144	2025 EB_{14}	—	March 9, 2025	Kitt Peak-Bok	Bok NEO Survey	H	250 m	MPC · JPL
875145	2025 FQ_{8}	—	May 5, 2014	Mount Lemmon	Mount Lemmon Survey	·	2.0 km	MPC · JPL
875146	2025 FE_{10}	—	February 12, 2018	Haleakala	Pan-STARRS 1	·	500 m	MPC · JPL
875147	2025 FV_{19}	—	October 28, 2017	Haleakala	Pan-STARRS 1	·	1.6 km	MPC · JPL
875148	2025 FM_{31}	—	January 18, 2015	Mount Lemmon	Mount Lemmon Survey	·	1.3 km	MPC · JPL
875149	2025 HE_{6}	—	April 22, 2025	La Palma-Liverpool	Romanov, F. D.	·	370 m	MPC · JPL
875150 Burkegaffneyobs	2025 KX_{5}	Burkegaffneyobs	May 23, 2025	La Palma-Liverpool	Romanov, F. D.	·	1.1 km	MPC · JPL
875151	1992 SN_{4}	—	September 24, 1992	Kitt Peak	Spacewatch	·	660 m	MPC · JPL
875152	1994 YE_{4}	—	December 31, 1994	Kitt Peak	Spacewatch	·	1.1 km	MPC · JPL
875153	1995 BX_{3}	—	January 28, 1995	Kitt Peak	S. M. Larson, C. W. Hergenrother	·	1.2 km	MPC · JPL
875154	1995 DC_{6}	—	February 24, 1995	Kitt Peak	Spacewatch	·	1.1 km	MPC · JPL
875155	1995 UQ_{10}	—	October 17, 1995	Kitt Peak	Spacewatch	EUN	800 m	MPC · JPL
875156	1995 UW_{34}	—	October 21, 1995	Kitt Peak	Spacewatch	·	1.9 km	MPC · JPL
875157	1995 WB_{34}	—	November 20, 1995	Kitt Peak	Spacewatch	·	620 m	MPC · JPL
875158	1996 RE_{21}	—	September 6, 1996	Kitt Peak	Spacewatch	ADE	1.4 km	MPC · JPL
875159	1996 TT_{35}	—	October 11, 1996	Kitt Peak	Spacewatch	·	860 m	MPC · JPL
875160	1996 UK_{3}	—	October 16, 1996	Kitt Peak	Spacewatch	critical	1.9 km	MPC · JPL
875161	1996 VF_{29}	—	November 13, 1996	Kitt Peak	Spacewatch	·	700 m	MPC · JPL
875162	1997 GK_{28}	—	April 13, 1997	Kitt Peak	Spacewatch	·	1.0 km	MPC · JPL
875163	1998 SH_{2}	—	September 17, 1998	Kitt Peak	Spacewatch	T_{j} (2.91) · APO · PHA	380 m	MPC · JPL
875164	1998 SU_{15}	—	September 16, 1998	Kitt Peak	Spacewatch	·	780 m	MPC · JPL
875165	1998 TX_{21}	—	October 13, 1998	Kitt Peak	Spacewatch	·	2.1 km	MPC · JPL
875166	1999 FW_{68}	—	March 20, 1999	Sacramento Peak	SDSS	·	1.4 km	MPC · JPL
875167	1999 QF_{1}	—	August 17, 1999	Kitt Peak	Spacewatch	·	890 m	MPC · JPL
875168	1999 RS_{9}	—	September 5, 1999	Kitt Peak	Spacewatch	·	1.1 km	MPC · JPL
875169	1999 TN_{43}	—	October 3, 1999	Kitt Peak	Spacewatch	·	1.1 km	MPC · JPL
875170	1999 TS_{54}	—	October 6, 1999	Kitt Peak	Spacewatch	·	920 m	MPC · JPL
875171	1999 TD_{65}	—	October 1, 1999	Kitt Peak	Spacewatch	·	460 m	MPC · JPL
875172	1999 TX_{66}	—	October 8, 1999	Kitt Peak	Spacewatch	·	890 m	MPC · JPL
875173	1999 TH_{78}	—	October 11, 1999	Kitt Peak	Spacewatch	·	750 m	MPC · JPL
875174	1999 TH_{239}	—	October 4, 1999	Catalina	CSS	·	1.2 km	MPC · JPL
875175	1999 TZ_{331}	—	October 13, 1999	Sacramento Peak	SDSS	·	540 m	MPC · JPL
875176	1999 TU_{341}	—	August 28, 2014	Haleakala	Pan-STARRS 1	·	1.4 km	MPC · JPL
875177	1999 TQ_{342}	—	October 3, 1999	Kitt Peak	Spacewatch	·	1.1 km	MPC · JPL
875178	1999 UC_{38}	—	October 13, 1999	Socorro	LINEAR	·	910 m	MPC · JPL
875179	1999 UA_{66}	—	September 23, 2012	Mount Lemmon	Mount Lemmon Survey	·	1.1 km	MPC · JPL
875180	1999 VQ_{3}	—	November 1, 1999	Kitt Peak	Spacewatch	·	790 m	MPC · JPL
875181	1999 VR_{6}	—	November 5, 1999	Socorro	LINEAR	APO	220 m	MPC · JPL
875182	1999 VX_{15}	—	November 2, 1999	Kitt Peak	Spacewatch	T_{j} (2.92) · AMO	650 m	MPC · JPL
875183	1999 VY_{15}	—	October 8, 1999	Kitt Peak	Spacewatch	·	870 m	MPC · JPL
875184	1999 XJ_{148}	—	December 7, 1999	Kitt Peak	Spacewatch	·	640 m	MPC · JPL
875185	2000 AU_{227}	—	January 12, 2000	Kitt Peak	Spacewatch	H	460 m	MPC · JPL
875186	2000 CN_{34}	—	February 3, 2000	Ondřejov	P. Pravec, P. Kušnirák	·	1.3 km	MPC · JPL
875187	2000 CH_{154}	—	September 9, 2015	Haleakala	Pan-STARRS 1	(5)	700 m	MPC · JPL
875188	2000 DL_{8}	—	February 26, 2000	Socorro	LINEAR	APO	540 m	MPC · JPL
875189	2000 EY_{209}	—	April 29, 2012	Kitt Peak	Spacewatch	·	2.2 km	MPC · JPL
875190	2000 FE_{52}	—	March 29, 2000	Kitt Peak	Spacewatch	·	1.9 km	MPC · JPL
875191	2000 FS_{74}	—	January 14, 2011	Kitt Peak	Spacewatch	MAS	440 m	MPC · JPL
875192	2000 LK_{10}	—	June 6, 2000	Kitt Peak	Spacewatch	AMO	440 m	MPC · JPL
875193	2000 PY_{33}	—	December 26, 2014	Haleakala	Pan-STARRS 1	·	2.2 km	MPC · JPL
875194	2000 RP_{106}	—	August 12, 2013	Haleakala	Pan-STARRS 1	·	960 m	MPC · JPL
875195	2000 RC_{113}	—	September 5, 2000	Sacramento Peak	SDSS	·	820 m	MPC · JPL
875196	2000 SL_{201}	—	September 24, 2000	Socorro	LINEAR	·	430 m	MPC · JPL
875197	2000 TV_{1}	—	October 2, 2000	Socorro	LINEAR	EUN	900 m	MPC · JPL
875198	2000 TO_{4}	—	September 24, 2000	Kitt Peak	Spacewatch	(5)	850 m	MPC · JPL
875199	2000 TU_{26}	—	October 2, 2000	Socorro	LINEAR	·	800 m	MPC · JPL
875200	2000 TF_{61}	—	October 2, 2000	Socorro	LINEAR	·	1.2 km	MPC · JPL

== 875201–875300 ==
back to top

Designation			Discovery			Properties		Ref
Permanent	Provisional	Named after	Date	Site	Discoverer(s)	Category	Diam.	Ref
875201	2000 TC_{64}	—	October 4, 2000	Socorro	LINEAR	·	990 m	MPC · JPL
875202	2000 TG_{81}	—	August 20, 2014	Haleakala	Pan-STARRS 1	BRA	950 m	MPC · JPL
875203	2000 UJ_{11}	—	October 25, 2000	Socorro	LINEAR	·	1.2 km	MPC · JPL
875204	2000 UL_{116}	—	October 19, 2000	Kitt Peak	Spacewatch	·	1.5 km	MPC · JPL
875205	2000 WB_{13}	—	November 20, 2000	Socorro	LINEAR	·	1.2 km	MPC · JPL
875206	2000 WB_{28}	—	November 26, 2000	Kitt Peak	Spacewatch	·	780 m	MPC · JPL
875207	2000 WM_{63}	—	November 26, 2000	Socorro	LINEAR	APO	290 m	MPC · JPL
875208	2000 XQ_{54}	—	December 4, 2000	Bohyunsan	Jeon, Y.-B., Lee, B.-C.	·	730 m	MPC · JPL
875209	2001 CV_{50}	—	October 28, 2014	Haleakala	Pan-STARRS 1	·	760 m	MPC · JPL
875210	2001 DX_{1}	—	February 16, 2001	Kitt Peak	Spacewatch	·	1.0 km	MPC · JPL
875211	2001 DF_{120}	—	May 11, 2015	Mount Lemmon	Mount Lemmon Survey	·	410 m	MPC · JPL
875212	2001 DG_{120}	—	August 29, 2016	Mount Lemmon	Mount Lemmon Survey	·	970 m	MPC · JPL
875213	2001 FD_{202}	—	October 10, 2007	Mount Lemmon	Mount Lemmon Survey	·	1.4 km	MPC · JPL
875214	2001 FP_{214}	—	March 25, 2001	Kitt Peak	Deep Ecliptic Survey	·	1.1 km	MPC · JPL
875215	2001 FE_{218}	—	March 25, 2001	Kitt Peak	Deep Ecliptic Survey	·	920 m	MPC · JPL
875216	2001 FO_{222}	—	March 22, 2001	Kitt Peak	SKADS	MAS	420 m	MPC · JPL
875217	2001 FF_{229}	—	March 23, 2001	Kitt Peak	SKADS	·	1.3 km	MPC · JPL
875218	2001 FA_{246}	—	May 19, 2010	Kitt Peak	Spacewatch	·	1.2 km	MPC · JPL
875219	2001 HC_{4}	—	April 1, 2001	Anderson Mesa	LONEOS	·	830 m	MPC · JPL
875220	2001 KX_{67}	—	May 29, 2001	Palomar	NEAT	T_{j} (2.85)	3.2 km	MPC · JPL
875221	2001 KD_{87}	—	April 3, 2019	Haleakala	Pan-STARRS 1	·	1.2 km	MPC · JPL
875222	2001 KY_{87}	—	March 6, 2016	Haleakala	Pan-STARRS 1	EOS	1.4 km	MPC · JPL
875223	2001 OO_{55}	—	July 22, 2001	Palomar	NEAT	·	1.3 km	MPC · JPL
875224	2001 PY_{35}	—	August 11, 2001	Palomar	NEAT	·	1.8 km	MPC · JPL
875225	2001 PA_{55}	—	August 14, 2001	Haleakala	NEAT	·	970 m	MPC · JPL
875226	2001 PK_{60}	—	August 13, 2001	Haleakala	NEAT	·	940 m	MPC · JPL
875227	2001 QJ_{86}	—	August 16, 2001	Palomar	NEAT	·	630 m	MPC · JPL
875228	2001 QU_{299}	—	August 19, 2001	Cerro Tololo	Deep Ecliptic Survey	·	770 m	MPC · JPL
875229	2001 QP_{314}	—	August 20, 2001	Cerro Tololo	Deep Ecliptic Survey	·	830 m	MPC · JPL
875230	2001 QL_{315}	—	August 20, 2001	Cerro Tololo	Deep Ecliptic Survey	·	1.2 km	MPC · JPL
875231	2001 QZ_{315}	—	August 20, 2001	Cerro Tololo	Deep Ecliptic Survey	·	2.2 km	MPC · JPL
875232	2001 QN_{329}	—	August 23, 2001	Anderson Mesa	LONEOS	·	1.2 km	MPC · JPL
875233	2001 RX_{157}	—	September 12, 2001	Kitt Peak	Spacewatch	·	1.3 km	MPC · JPL
875234	2001 SR_{5}	—	September 16, 2001	Socorro	LINEAR	PHO	670 m	MPC · JPL
875235	2001 SU_{196}	—	September 19, 2001	Socorro	LINEAR	·	500 m	MPC · JPL
875236	2001 SQ_{263}	—	September 23, 2001	Anderson Mesa	LONEOS	ATE	110 m	MPC · JPL
875237	2001 SL_{320}	—	September 19, 2001	Socorro	LINEAR	·	850 m	MPC · JPL
875238	2001 SE_{359}	—	February 14, 2016	Haleakala	Pan-STARRS 1	H	350 m	MPC · JPL
875239	2001 SJ_{362}	—	November 6, 2013	Haleakala	Pan-STARRS 1	·	760 m	MPC · JPL
875240	2001 TO	—	October 7, 2001	Palomar	NEAT	·	380 m	MPC · JPL
875241	2001 TS_{2}	—	September 28, 2001	Palomar	NEAT	PHO	610 m	MPC · JPL
875242	2001 TE_{46}	—	October 15, 2001	Socorro	LINEAR	PHO	630 m	MPC · JPL
875243	2001 TV_{129}	—	October 15, 2001	Kitt Peak	Spacewatch	3:2 · SHU	3.3 km	MPC · JPL
875244	2001 TL_{130}	—	October 15, 2001	Kitt Peak	Spacewatch	·	1.0 km	MPC · JPL
875245	2001 TD_{246}	—	September 18, 2001	Kitt Peak	Spacewatch	VER	2.1 km	MPC · JPL
875246	2001 TW_{261}	—	September 18, 2001	Sacramento Peak	SDSS	·	720 m	MPC · JPL
875247	2001 TP_{269}	—	October 11, 2001	Kitt Peak	Spacewatch	·	880 m	MPC · JPL
875248	2001 UU	—	October 17, 2001	Socorro	LINEAR	·	690 m	MPC · JPL
875249	2001 UE_{5}	—	October 20, 2001	Socorro	LINEAR	AMO	610 m	MPC · JPL
875250	2001 UP_{95}	—	September 19, 2001	Socorro	LINEAR	·	1.0 km	MPC · JPL
875251	2001 UO_{186}	—	October 17, 2001	Kitt Peak	Spacewatch	·	460 m	MPC · JPL
875252	2001 UM_{199}	—	October 23, 2001	Kitt Peak	Spacewatch	·	1.6 km	MPC · JPL
875253	2001 VT_{2}	—	October 14, 2001	Socorro	LINEAR	PHO	780 m	MPC · JPL
875254	2001 VY_{138}	—	November 12, 2001	Sacramento Peak	SDSS	·	850 m	MPC · JPL
875255	2001 WF_{97}	—	November 18, 2001	Kitt Peak	Spacewatch	·	1.8 km	MPC · JPL
875256	2001 YS_{3}	—	December 20, 2001	Palomar	NEAT	·	470 m	MPC · JPL
875257	2001 YY_{132}	—	December 9, 2001	Socorro	LINEAR	T_{j} (2.99)	3.0 km	MPC · JPL
875258	2001 YN_{133}	—	December 18, 2001	Kitt Peak	Spacewatch	·	740 m	MPC · JPL
875259	2002 AO_{14}	—	January 5, 2002	Kitt Peak	Spacewatch	·	760 m	MPC · JPL
875260	2002 CG_{318}	—	February 13, 2002	Sacramento Peak	SDSS	·	1.3 km	MPC · JPL
875261	2002 CB_{325}	—	October 2, 2014	Mount Lemmon	Mount Lemmon Survey	KOR	990 m	MPC · JPL
875262	2002 CT_{329}	—	February 9, 2002	Kitt Peak	Spacewatch	·	760 m	MPC · JPL
875263	2002 EW_{168}	—	January 5, 2014	Haleakala	Pan-STARRS 1	·	870 m	MPC · JPL
875264	2002 EJ_{172}	—	December 15, 2009	Mount Lemmon	Mount Lemmon Survey	·	850 m	MPC · JPL
875265	2002 FA	—	March 14, 2002	Palomar	NEAT	·	560 m	MPC · JPL
875266	2002 FZ_{23}	—	March 21, 2002	Kitt Peak	Spacewatch	·	1.7 km	MPC · JPL
875267	2002 GW_{3}	—	April 9, 2002	Palomar	NEAT	·	610 m	MPC · JPL
875268	2002 GV_{9}	—	April 14, 2002	Socorro	LINEAR	BAR	860 m	MPC · JPL
875269	2002 GR_{160}	—	April 15, 2002	Palomar	NEAT	T_{j} (2.93)	2.2 km	MPC · JPL
875270	2002 GR_{185}	—	April 9, 2002	Palomar	NEAT	·	860 m	MPC · JPL
875271	2002 GF_{195}	—	April 8, 2002	Palomar	NEAT	·	1.3 km	MPC · JPL
875272	2002 LX	—	June 3, 2002	Socorro	LINEAR	APO · PHA	200 m	MPC · JPL
875273	2002 MZ_{6}	—	June 17, 2002	Palomar	NEAT	·	1.3 km	MPC · JPL
875274	2002 NN_{39}	—	July 7, 2002	J-Six Ranchettes	W. K. Y. Yeung	·	940 m	MPC · JPL
875275	2002 NC_{61}	—	August 6, 2002	Palomar	NEAT	·	2.1 km	MPC · JPL
875276	2002 NG_{73}	—	July 8, 2002	Palomar	NEAT	·	520 m	MPC · JPL
875277	2002 NP_{83}	—	October 8, 2015	Haleakala	Pan-STARRS 1	·	750 m	MPC · JPL
875278	2002 OX_{31}	—	August 9, 2002	Cerro Tololo	Deep Ecliptic Survey	·	1.1 km	MPC · JPL
875279	2002 OU_{34}	—	July 18, 2002	Palomar	NEAT	·	990 m	MPC · JPL
875280	2002 OD_{35}	—	July 21, 2002	Palomar	NEAT	·	550 m	MPC · JPL
875281	2002 OM_{38}	—	August 5, 2002	Palomar	NEAT	BRG	1.0 km	MPC · JPL
875282	2002 PU	—	August 3, 2002	Palomar	NEAT	·	1.2 km	MPC · JPL
875283	2002 PP_{5}	—	July 21, 2002	Palomar	NEAT	·	1.5 km	MPC · JPL
875284	2002 PX_{106}	—	August 4, 2002	Palomar	NEAT	·	1.8 km	MPC · JPL
875285	2002 PC_{112}	—	August 5, 2002	Palomar	NEAT	(1547)	850 m	MPC · JPL
875286	2002 PR_{139}	—	August 13, 2002	Socorro	LINEAR	·	2.5 km	MPC · JPL
875287	2002 PO_{176}	—	August 4, 2002	Palomar	NEAT	·	710 m	MPC · JPL
875288	2002 PM_{180}	—	August 15, 2002	Palomar	NEAT	·	1.1 km	MPC · JPL
875289	2002 PZ_{184}	—	August 7, 2002	Campo Imperatore	CINEOS	·	430 m	MPC · JPL
875290	2002 PQ_{202}	—	August 8, 2002	Palomar	NEAT	·	820 m	MPC · JPL
875291	2002 PU_{205}	—	August 15, 2002	Kitt Peak	Spacewatch	·	1.3 km	MPC · JPL
875292	2002 QU_{10}	—	August 26, 2002	Palomar	NEAT	critical	940 m	MPC · JPL
875293	2002 QO_{26}	—	August 29, 2002	Kitt Peak	Spacewatch	·	1.1 km	MPC · JPL
875294	2002 QZ_{49}	—	August 17, 2002	Palomar	NEAT	·	1.1 km	MPC · JPL
875295	2002 QW_{58}	—	August 28, 2002	Palomar	NEAT	·	1.6 km	MPC · JPL
875296	2002 QJ_{64}	—	September 5, 2002	Socorro	LINEAR	·	1.0 km	MPC · JPL
875297	2002 QD_{67}	—	August 26, 2002	Palomar	NEAT	·	1.0 km	MPC · JPL
875298	2002 QF_{67}	—	August 29, 2002	Palomar	NEAT	DOR	1.4 km	MPC · JPL
875299	2002 QL_{67}	—	August 18, 2002	Palomar	NEAT	·	1.3 km	MPC · JPL
875300	2002 QE_{81}	—	August 18, 2002	Palomar	NEAT	THM	1.6 km	MPC · JPL

== 875301–875400 ==
back to top

Designation			Discovery			Properties		Ref
Permanent	Provisional	Named after	Date	Site	Discoverer(s)	Category	Diam.	Ref
875301	2002 QM_{81}	—	August 30, 2002	Palomar	NEAT	·	2.1 km	MPC · JPL
875302	2002 QC_{88}	—	August 16, 2002	Kitt Peak	Spacewatch	·	970 m	MPC · JPL
875303	2002 QG_{99}	—	August 29, 2002	Kitt Peak	Spacewatch	·	630 m	MPC · JPL
875304	2002 QQ_{106}	—	August 30, 2002	Palomar	NEAT	·	520 m	MPC · JPL
875305	2002 QR_{117}	—	August 26, 2002	Palomar	NEAT	·	470 m	MPC · JPL
875306	2002 QC_{122}	—	August 26, 2002	Palomar	NEAT	·	1.8 km	MPC · JPL
875307	2002 QF_{132}	—	August 16, 2002	Palomar	NEAT	·	370 m	MPC · JPL
875308	2002 QJ_{135}	—	August 30, 2002	Palomar	NEAT	H	270 m	MPC · JPL
875309	2002 QV_{137}	—	August 17, 2002	Palomar	NEAT	·	2.0 km	MPC · JPL
875310	2002 QH_{141}	—	August 20, 2002	Palomar	NEAT	·	1.9 km	MPC · JPL
875311	2002 QO_{155}	—	November 1, 2007	Kitt Peak	Spacewatch	·	1.3 km	MPC · JPL
875312	2002 QJ_{157}	—	August 25, 2002	Palomar	NEAT	critical	1.1 km	MPC · JPL
875313	2002 QG_{158}	—	January 4, 2016	Haleakala	Pan-STARRS 1	(5)	880 m	MPC · JPL
875314	2002 RC_{130}	—	September 11, 2002	Palomar	NEAT	·	900 m	MPC · JPL
875315	2002 RO_{202}	—	September 5, 2002	Anderson Mesa	LONEOS	·	640 m	MPC · JPL
875316	2002 RX_{262}	—	September 13, 2002	Palomar	NEAT	·	2.0 km	MPC · JPL
875317	2002 RU_{264}	—	October 5, 2002	Socorro	LINEAR	·	1.2 km	MPC · JPL
875318	2002 RZ_{265}	—	September 13, 2002	Palomar	NEAT	·	660 m	MPC · JPL
875319	2002 RM_{267}	—	October 31, 2002	Sacramento Peak	SDSS	AEO	810 m	MPC · JPL
875320	2002 RV_{275}	—	September 14, 2002	Palomar	NEAT	DOR	1.3 km	MPC · JPL
875321	2002 RU_{291}	—	September 14, 2002	Haleakala	NEAT	AEO	830 m	MPC · JPL
875322	2002 RM_{301}	—	September 13, 2002	Palomar	NEAT	·	1.1 km	MPC · JPL
875323	2002 SA_{1}	—	September 26, 2002	Palomar	NEAT	·	1.8 km	MPC · JPL
875324	2002 SM_{2}	—	September 26, 2002	Palomar	NEAT	·	2.0 km	MPC · JPL
875325	2002 SP_{41}	—	September 30, 2002	Socorro	LINEAR	·	990 m	MPC · JPL
875326	2002 TA_{9}	—	October 1, 2002	Socorro	LINEAR	·	1.8 km	MPC · JPL
875327	2002 TD_{92}	—	October 3, 2002	Socorro	LINEAR	·	1.5 km	MPC · JPL
875328	2002 TA_{162}	—	October 5, 2002	Palomar	NEAT	·	1.1 km	MPC · JPL
875329	2002 TK_{255}	—	October 9, 2002	Anderson Mesa	LONEOS	·	1.5 km	MPC · JPL
875330	2002 TX_{374}	—	August 16, 2020	Haleakala	Pan-STARRS 1	AGN	940 m	MPC · JPL
875331	2002 TR_{386}	—	October 4, 2002	Palomar	NEAT	·	1.0 km	MPC · JPL
875332	2002 TR_{392}	—	May 14, 2018	Mount Lemmon	Mount Lemmon Survey	·	1.8 km	MPC · JPL
875333	2002 UN_{11}	—	October 30, 2002	Mount Hopkins	T. B. Spahr, I. Ginsburg	·	320 m	MPC · JPL
875334	2002 UP_{25}	—	October 3, 2002	Socorro	LINEAR	·	2.3 km	MPC · JPL
875335	2002 US_{52}	—	October 10, 2002	Palomar	NEAT	·	480 m	MPC · JPL
875336	2002 US_{59}	—	August 15, 2013	Haleakala	Pan-STARRS 1	·	2.1 km	MPC · JPL
875337	2002 UT_{60}	—	October 10, 2002	Palomar	NEAT	·	1.5 km	MPC · JPL
875338	2002 UG_{61}	—	August 5, 2002	Palomar	NEAT	·	1.0 km	MPC · JPL
875339	2002 US_{61}	—	August 27, 2002	Palomar	NEAT	·	1.1 km	MPC · JPL
875340	2002 UM_{76}	—	October 31, 2002	Sacramento Peak	SDSS	·	1.2 km	MPC · JPL
875341	2002 VQ_{153}	—	August 29, 2013	Haleakala	Pan-STARRS 1	·	2.4 km	MPC · JPL
875342	2002 VJ_{154}	—	October 12, 2013	Mount Lemmon	Mount Lemmon Survey	·	1.9 km	MPC · JPL
875343	2002 WY_{28}	—	November 22, 2002	Palomar	NEAT	·	850 m	MPC · JPL
875344	2002 XK_{40}	—	October 15, 2002	Socorro	LINEAR	·	1.2 km	MPC · JPL
875345	2003 BA_{43}	—	January 27, 2003	Haleakala	NEAT	·	1.4 km	MPC · JPL
875346	2003 BO_{92}	—	February 22, 2003	Palomar	NEAT	H	410 m	MPC · JPL
875347	2003 BH_{103}	—	January 27, 2003	Kitt Peak	Spacewatch	·	2.0 km	MPC · JPL
875348	2003 CB_{28}	—	December 4, 2015	Haleakala	Pan-STARRS 1	·	1.5 km	MPC · JPL
875349	2003 FF_{139}	—	April 18, 2015	Cerro Tololo	DECam	·	2.3 km	MPC · JPL
875350	2003 FJ_{139}	—	February 21, 2017	Haleakala	Pan-STARRS 1	·	1.6 km	MPC · JPL
875351	2003 GV_{21}	—	April 7, 2003	Kitt Peak	Spacewatch	H	370 m	MPC · JPL
875352	2003 GT_{60}	—	December 30, 2015	Mount Lemmon	Mount Lemmon Survey	H	390 m	MPC · JPL
875353	2003 HR_{23}	—	April 25, 2003	Kitt Peak	Spacewatch	BAR	560 m	MPC · JPL
875354	2003 HM_{57}	—	April 2, 2015	Haleakala	Pan-STARRS 1	·	90 km	MPC · JPL
875355	2003 HU_{62}	—	April 30, 2003	Kitt Peak	Spacewatch	·	1 km	MPC · JPL
875356	2003 NW	—	July 2, 2003	Socorro	LINEAR	·	1.1 km	MPC · JPL
875357	2003 OK_{18}	—	July 26, 2003	Palomar	NEAT	·	1.0 km	MPC · JPL
875358	2003 QX_{107}	—	August 31, 2003	Kitt Peak	Spacewatch	H	390 m	MPC · JPL
875359	2003 RX_{11}	—	September 15, 2003	Palomar	NEAT	·	420 m	MPC · JPL
875360	2003 RS_{28}	—	September 4, 2003	Kitt Peak	Spacewatch	·	1.0 km	MPC · JPL
875361	2003 SL	—	September 16, 2003	Kitt Peak	Spacewatch	·	1.6 km	MPC · JPL
875362	2003 SR_{2}	—	September 16, 2003	Kitt Peak	Spacewatch	·	860 m	MPC · JPL
875363	2003 SL_{4}	—	September 16, 2003	Kitt Peak	Spacewatch	·	1.1 km	MPC · JPL
875364	2003 SA_{6}	—	September 16, 2003	Kitt Peak	Spacewatch	·	1.1 km	MPC · JPL
875365	2003 SB_{24}	—	September 17, 2003	Palomar	NEAT	·	1.0 km	MPC · JPL
875366	2003 SQ_{123}	—	September 18, 2003	Kitt Peak	Spacewatch	EUN	700 m	MPC · JPL
875367	2003 SM_{130}	—	September 20, 2003	Socorro	LINEAR	·	1.1 km	MPC · JPL
875368	2003 SV_{173}	—	September 18, 2003	Socorro	LINEAR	(1547)	1.1 km	MPC · JPL
875369	2003 SU_{183}	—	September 21, 2003	Kitt Peak	Spacewatch	·	1.1 km	MPC · JPL
875370	2003 SZ_{184}	—	September 21, 2003	Kitt Peak	Spacewatch	·	980 m	MPC · JPL
875371	2003 SH_{217}	—	September 27, 2003	Desert Eagle	W. K. Y. Yeung	·	550 m	MPC · JPL
875372	2003 SZ_{218}	—	September 18, 2003	Socorro	LINEAR	H	360 m	MPC · JPL
875373	2003 SG_{237}	—	September 22, 2003	Anderson Mesa	LONEOS	·	1.8 km	MPC · JPL
875374	2003 SC_{245}	—	September 18, 2003	Kitt Peak	Spacewatch	·	1.7 km	MPC · JPL
875375	2003 SB_{258}	—	September 22, 2003	Anderson Mesa	LONEOS	·	2.1 km	MPC · JPL
875376	2003 SQ_{298}	—	September 19, 2003	Palomar	NEAT	(1547)	1.5 km	MPC · JPL
875377	2003 SP_{307}	—	September 19, 2003	Kitt Peak	Spacewatch	critical	820 m	MPC · JPL
875378	2003 ST_{328}	—	September 21, 2003	Kitt Peak	Spacewatch	·	780 m	MPC · JPL
875379	2003 SS_{334}	—	September 29, 2003	Kitt Peak	Spacewatch	·	1.8 km	MPC · JPL
875380	2003 SH_{337}	—	October 2, 2003	Kitt Peak	Spacewatch	·	1.7 km	MPC · JPL
875381	2003 SH_{347}	—	September 18, 2003	Kitt Peak	Spacewatch	·	1.3 km	MPC · JPL
875382	2003 SW_{356}	—	September 18, 2003	Kitt Peak	Spacewatch	NYS	700 m	MPC · JPL
875383	2003 SB_{385}	—	September 26, 2003	Sacramento Peak	SDSS	·	1.9 km	MPC · JPL
875384	2003 SV_{401}	—	September 26, 2003	Sacramento Peak	SDSS	·	820 m	MPC · JPL
875385	2003 SD_{402}	—	September 26, 2003	Sacramento Peak	SDSS	H	350 m	MPC · JPL
875386	2003 SL_{402}	—	September 26, 2003	Sacramento Peak	SDSS	·	1.8 km	MPC · JPL
875387	2003 SY_{412}	—	September 28, 2003	Kitt Peak	Spacewatch	·	620 m	MPC · JPL
875388	2003 SW_{417}	—	October 20, 2003	Kitt Peak	Spacewatch	·	2.1 km	MPC · JPL
875389	2003 SF_{419}	—	September 28, 2003	Sacramento Peak	SDSS	EOS	1.3 km	MPC · JPL
875390	2003 SH_{422}	—	September 26, 2003	Sacramento Peak	SDSS	·	590 m	MPC · JPL
875391	2003 SC_{429}	—	September 19, 2003	Kitt Peak	Spacewatch	JUN	560 m	MPC · JPL
875392	2003 SM_{430}	—	September 16, 2003	Kitt Peak	Spacewatch	·	990 m	MPC · JPL
875393	2003 SF_{440}	—	September 28, 2003	Kitt Peak	Spacewatch	·	2.2 km	MPC · JPL
875394	2003 SW_{446}	—	December 31, 2008	Kitt Peak	Spacewatch	·	890 m	MPC · JPL
875395	2003 SF_{447}	—	September 28, 2003	Kitt Peak	Spacewatch	LEO	1.1 km	MPC · JPL
875396	2003 SQ_{449}	—	September 22, 2003	Kitt Peak	Spacewatch	·	1.4 km	MPC · JPL
875397	2003 SF_{457}	—	September 27, 2003	Kitt Peak	Spacewatch	·	1.5 km	MPC · JPL
875398	2003 ST_{460}	—	May 20, 2015	Cerro Tololo	DECam	·	1.1 km	MPC · JPL
875399	2003 SE_{462}	—	July 30, 2008	Mount Lemmon	Mount Lemmon Survey	·	1.4 km	MPC · JPL
875400	2003 SX_{462}	—	September 29, 2003	Kitt Peak	Spacewatch	·	620 m	MPC · JPL

== 875401–875500 ==
back to top

Designation			Discovery			Properties		Ref
Permanent	Provisional	Named after	Date	Site	Discoverer(s)	Category	Diam.	Ref
875401	2003 SO_{464}	—	September 21, 2003	Kitt Peak	Spacewatch	·	1.2 km	MPC · JPL
875402	2003 SK_{465}	—	September 22, 2003	Kitt Peak	Spacewatch	·	1.3 km	MPC · JPL
875403	2003 SJ_{466}	—	October 18, 2003	Kitt Peak	Spacewatch	·	970 m	MPC · JPL
875404	2003 SS_{472}	—	September 16, 2003	Kitt Peak	Spacewatch	·	670 m	MPC · JPL
875405	2003 SY_{475}	—	September 29, 2003	Kitt Peak	Spacewatch	·	1.1 km	MPC · JPL
875406	2003 SG_{478}	—	September 28, 2003	Kitt Peak	Spacewatch	·	1.3 km	MPC · JPL
875407	2003 TD_{23}	—	October 1, 2003	Kitt Peak	Spacewatch	·	670 m	MPC · JPL
875408	2003 TT_{41}	—	October 2, 2003	Kitt Peak	Spacewatch	·	1.6 km	MPC · JPL
875409	2003 TP_{42}	—	October 2, 2003	Kitt Peak	Spacewatch	·	1.5 km	MPC · JPL
875410	2003 TM_{63}	—	July 30, 2008	Mount Lemmon	Mount Lemmon Survey	·	1.7 km	MPC · JPL
875411	2003 TD_{65}	—	October 5, 2003	Kitt Peak	Spacewatch	·	890 m	MPC · JPL
875412	2003 UX_{19}	—	October 21, 2003	Socorro	LINEAR	·	1.1 km	MPC · JPL
875413	2003 UZ_{28}	—	October 22, 2003	Kitt Peak	Spacewatch	·	640 m	MPC · JPL
875414	2003 UX_{32}	—	October 16, 2003	Kitt Peak	Spacewatch	·	870 m	MPC · JPL
875415	2003 UY_{42}	—	October 17, 2003	Kitt Peak	Spacewatch	·	1.1 km	MPC · JPL
875416	2003 UG_{82}	—	October 15, 2003	Palomar	NEAT	·	1.2 km	MPC · JPL
875417	2003 UB_{116}	—	October 21, 2003	Palomar	NEAT	·	510 m	MPC · JPL
875418	2003 UB_{129}	—	October 21, 2003	Kitt Peak	Spacewatch	·	1.6 km	MPC · JPL
875419	2003 UM_{153}	—	October 4, 2003	Kitt Peak	Spacewatch	·	1.2 km	MPC · JPL
875420	2003 UY_{159}	—	October 21, 2003	Palomar	NEAT	(1547)	1 km	MPC · JPL
875421	2003 UN_{179}	—	October 21, 2003	Socorro	LINEAR	·	1.3 km	MPC · JPL
875422	2003 UQ_{192}	—	October 23, 2003	Kitt Peak	Spacewatch	·	1.1 km	MPC · JPL
875423	2003 UG_{329}	—	September 27, 2003	Kitt Peak	Spacewatch	H	300 m	MPC · JPL
875424	2003 UC_{334}	—	October 18, 2003	Sacramento Peak	SDSS	·	1.7 km	MPC · JPL
875425	2003 UH_{345}	—	September 18, 2003	Kitt Peak	Spacewatch	·	1.5 km	MPC · JPL
875426	2003 UD_{356}	—	September 28, 2003	Kitt Peak	Spacewatch	·	1.7 km	MPC · JPL
875427	2003 UP_{364}	—	October 20, 2003	Kitt Peak	Spacewatch	·	910 m	MPC · JPL
875428	2003 UF_{381}	—	October 22, 2003	Sacramento Peak	SDSS	·	1.9 km	MPC · JPL
875429	2003 UA_{387}	—	October 23, 2003	Kitt Peak	Spacewatch	·	1.5 km	MPC · JPL
875430	2003 US_{388}	—	October 22, 2003	Kitt Peak	Spacewatch	·	1.1 km	MPC · JPL
875431	2003 UP_{392}	—	October 22, 2003	Sacramento Peak	SDSS	·	1.7 km	MPC · JPL
875432	2003 UV_{393}	—	October 22, 2003	Sacramento Peak	SDSS	·	1.2 km	MPC · JPL
875433	2003 UY_{430}	—	March 2, 2017	Mount Lemmon	Mount Lemmon Survey	H	290 m	MPC · JPL
875434	2003 UU_{432}	—	October 29, 2003	Kitt Peak	Spacewatch	·	650 m	MPC · JPL
875435	2003 UZ_{435}	—	March 2, 2016	Mount Lemmon	Mount Lemmon Survey	EOS	1.1 km	MPC · JPL
875436	2003 UH_{436}	—	November 21, 2014	Haleakala	Pan-STARRS 1	·	1.6 km	MPC · JPL
875437	2003 US_{441}	—	September 6, 2008	Kitt Peak	Spacewatch	THM	1.7 km	MPC · JPL
875438	2003 UK_{443}	—	January 3, 2009	Kitt Peak	Spacewatch	·	1.3 km	MPC · JPL
875439	2003 UX_{443}	—	October 24, 2003	Sacramento Peak	SDSS	·	700 m	MPC · JPL
875440	2003 UN_{444}	—	October 25, 2003	Kitt Peak	Spacewatch	·	1.6 km	MPC · JPL
875441	2003 UN_{445}	—	October 19, 2003	Kitt Peak	Spacewatch	·	1.1 km	MPC · JPL
875442	2003 UQ_{445}	—	October 19, 2003	Sacramento Peak	SDSS	·	940 m	MPC · JPL
875443	2003 UO_{446}	—	October 29, 2003	Kitt Peak	Spacewatch	·	1.6 km	MPC · JPL
875444	2003 UA_{448}	—	October 16, 2003	Kitt Peak	Spacewatch	BAR	570 m	MPC · JPL
875445	2003 UG_{449}	—	October 22, 2003	Kitt Peak	Deep Ecliptic Survey	·	1.1 km	MPC · JPL
875446	2003 VD_{1}	—	November 5, 2003	Socorro	LINEAR	·	1.8 km	MPC · JPL
875447	2003 WD_{173}	—	November 16, 2003	Kitt Peak	Spacewatch	·	1.8 km	MPC · JPL
875448	2003 WH_{174}	—	November 19, 2003	Kitt Peak	Spacewatch	·	880 m	MPC · JPL
875449	2003 WF_{188}	—	November 23, 2003	Kitt Peak	Deep Ecliptic Survey	·	1.6 km	MPC · JPL
875450	2003 WD_{206}	—	September 3, 2008	Kitt Peak	Spacewatch	THM	1.6 km	MPC · JPL
875451	2003 WT_{207}	—	July 1, 2017	Mount Lemmon	Mount Lemmon Survey	·	880 m	MPC · JPL
875452	2003 WM_{208}	—	October 3, 2014	Mount Lemmon	Mount Lemmon Survey	·	2.0 km	MPC · JPL
875453	2003 WO_{208}	—	October 9, 2008	Mount Lemmon	Mount Lemmon Survey	·	1.7 km	MPC · JPL
875454	2003 WM_{214}	—	November 29, 2003	Kitt Peak	Spacewatch	·	1.9 km	MPC · JPL
875455	2003 WR_{214}	—	November 19, 2003	Kitt Peak	Spacewatch	·	1.6 km	MPC · JPL
875456	2003 WA_{215}	—	November 18, 2003	Kitt Peak	Spacewatch	EUN	900 m	MPC · JPL
875457	2003 WJ_{216}	—	November 24, 2003	Kitt Peak	Spacewatch	·	1.1 km	MPC · JPL
875458	2003 XG_{7}	—	November 19, 2003	Socorro	LINEAR	·	1.2 km	MPC · JPL
875459	2003 XV_{18}	—	December 14, 2003	Kitt Peak	Spacewatch	·	2.0 km	MPC · JPL
875460	2003 XB_{34}	—	December 1, 2003	Kitt Peak	Spacewatch	·	480 m	MPC · JPL
875461	2003 YJ	—	December 17, 2003	Palomar	NEAT	ATE	300 m	MPC · JPL
875462	2003 YE_{13}	—	December 17, 2003	Anderson Mesa	LONEOS	T_{j} (2.87)	1.6 km	MPC · JPL
875463	2003 YY_{36}	—	December 17, 2003	Kitt Peak	Spacewatch	·	930 m	MPC · JPL
875464	2003 YY_{49}	—	December 18, 2003	Socorro	LINEAR	·	810 m	MPC · JPL
875465	2003 YA_{120}	—	December 27, 2003	Socorro	LINEAR	·	1.5 km	MPC · JPL
875466	2003 YA_{167}	—	December 17, 2003	Kitt Peak	Spacewatch	·	1.1 km	MPC · JPL
875467	2003 YG_{190}	—	September 19, 2007	Kitt Peak	Spacewatch	MIS	1.3 km	MPC · JPL
875468	2003 YD_{191}	—	December 18, 2003	Kitt Peak	Spacewatch	·	1.3 km	MPC · JPL
875469	2004 BZ_{6}	—	January 16, 2004	Kitt Peak	Spacewatch	TIR	1.7 km	MPC · JPL
875470	2004 BD_{170}	—	March 17, 2016	Mount Lemmon	Mount Lemmon Survey	·	2.0 km	MPC · JPL
875471	2004 BY_{171}	—	May 9, 2018	Mount Lemmon	Mount Lemmon Survey	·	1.4 km	MPC · JPL
875472	2004 CR_{20}	—	February 11, 2004	Kitt Peak	Spacewatch	·	1.2 km	MPC · JPL
875473	2004 CJ_{91}	—	February 12, 2004	Kitt Peak	Spacewatch	·	1.5 km	MPC · JPL
875474	2004 CW_{130}	—	February 12, 2004	Palomar	NEAT	·	2.2 km	MPC · JPL
875475	2004 CJ_{133}	—	September 25, 2007	Mount Lemmon	Mount Lemmon Survey	·	950 m	MPC · JPL
875476	2004 DX_{85}	—	March 13, 2016	Haleakala	Pan-STARRS 1	URS	2.3 km	MPC · JPL
875477	2004 DJ_{89}	—	December 25, 2011	Kitt Peak	Spacewatch	·	820 m	MPC · JPL
875478	2004 EW_{4}	—	March 11, 2004	Palomar	NEAT	PHO	720 m	MPC · JPL
875479	2004 ER_{33}	—	March 15, 2004	Kitt Peak	Spacewatch	H	310 m	MPC · JPL
875480	2004 EG_{91}	—	March 15, 2004	Kitt Peak	Spacewatch	EUP	2.2 km	MPC · JPL
875481	2004 FE_{1}	—	March 17, 2004	Kitt Peak	Spacewatch	·	330 m	MPC · JPL
875482	2004 FF_{17}	—	March 17, 2004	Mauna Kea	D. D. Balam	·	2.1 km	MPC · JPL
875483	2004 FP_{123}	—	March 26, 2004	Kitt Peak	Spacewatch	·	1.3 km	MPC · JPL
875484	2004 FP_{157}	—	March 17, 2004	Kitt Peak	Spacewatch	·	1.5 km	MPC · JPL
875485	2004 FL_{172}	—	March 18, 2004	Kitt Peak	Spacewatch	·	720 m	MPC · JPL
875486	2004 FR_{174}	—	March 24, 2012	Mount Lemmon	Mount Lemmon Survey	3:2	3.6 km	MPC · JPL
875487	2004 FT_{177}	—	March 23, 2004	Kitt Peak	Spacewatch	·	460 m	MPC · JPL
875488	2004 FC_{178}	—	March 21, 2004	Kitt Peak	Spacewatch	T_{j} (2.98)	2.3 km	MPC · JPL
875489	2004 FH_{178}	—	March 23, 2004	Kitt Peak	Spacewatch	·	940 m	MPC · JPL
875490	2004 GT_{6}	—	January 27, 2004	Kitt Peak	Spacewatch	·	640 m	MPC · JPL
875491	2004 GE_{91}	—	April 13, 2004	Sacramento Peak	SDSS	PHO	680 m	MPC · JPL
875492	2004 HH_{82}	—	March 15, 2013	Kitt Peak	Spacewatch	·	1.3 km	MPC · JPL
875493	2004 ME_{6}	—	June 25, 2004	Kitt Peak	Spacewatch	APO	260 m	MPC · JPL
875494	2004 NG_{1}	—	July 9, 2004	Palomar	NEAT	·	900 m	MPC · JPL
875495	2004 OE_{17}	—	July 17, 2004	Cerro Tololo	Deep Ecliptic Survey	·	1.4 km	MPC · JPL
875496	2004 PS_{42}	—	August 9, 2004	Socorro	LINEAR	AMO · PHA	200 m	MPC · JPL
875497	2004 PF_{63}	—	August 10, 2004	Socorro	LINEAR	·	870 m	MPC · JPL
875498	2004 PP_{79}	—	August 9, 2004	Socorro	LINEAR	·	960 m	MPC · JPL
875499	2004 PQ_{92}	—	August 12, 2004	Pla D'Arguines	R. Ferrando	·	980 m	MPC · JPL
875500	2004 QB_{2}	—	August 20, 2004	Socorro	LINEAR	T_{j} (2.91)	1.3 km	MPC · JPL

== 875501–875600 ==
back to top

Designation			Discovery			Properties		Ref
Permanent	Provisional	Named after	Date	Site	Discoverer(s)	Category	Diam.	Ref
875501	2004 QO_{35}	—	July 25, 2014	Haleakala	Pan-STARRS 1	·	1.3 km	MPC · JPL
875502	2004 QL_{38}	—	August 25, 2004	Kitt Peak	Spacewatch	EUN · critical	810 m	MPC · JPL
875503	2004 RS	—	September 4, 2004	Siding Spring	SSS	·	1.2 km	MPC · JPL
875504	2004 RZ_{17}	—	September 7, 2004	Kitt Peak	Spacewatch	·	730 m	MPC · JPL
875505	2004 RQ_{18}	—	August 14, 2004	Cerro Tololo	Deep Ecliptic Survey	·	1.4 km	MPC · JPL
875506	2004 RU_{39}	—	September 7, 2004	Kitt Peak	Spacewatch	·	540 m	MPC · JPL
875507	2004 RM_{97}	—	August 12, 2004	Cerro Tololo	Deep Ecliptic Survey	critical	960 m	MPC · JPL
875508	2004 RT_{109}	—	September 11, 2004	Socorro	LINEAR	T_{j} (2.47)	1.1 km	MPC · JPL
875509	2004 RP_{117}	—	September 7, 2004	Kitt Peak	Spacewatch	EUN	610 m	MPC · JPL
875510	2004 RU_{139}	—	September 8, 2004	Socorro	LINEAR	·	500 m	MPC · JPL
875511	2004 RL_{149}	—	September 9, 2004	Socorro	LINEAR	·	690 m	MPC · JPL
875512	2004 RY_{156}	—	September 10, 2004	Socorro	LINEAR	·	830 m	MPC · JPL
875513	2004 RR_{166}	—	September 7, 2004	Kitt Peak	Spacewatch	·	470 m	MPC · JPL
875514	2004 RF_{243}	—	September 10, 2004	Kitt Peak	Spacewatch	·	750 m	MPC · JPL
875515	2004 RH_{243}	—	September 10, 2004	Kitt Peak	Spacewatch	BRG	950 m	MPC · JPL
875516	2004 RO_{243}	—	September 10, 2004	Kitt Peak	Spacewatch	(5)	570 m	MPC · JPL
875517	2004 RF_{272}	—	September 11, 2004	Kitt Peak	Spacewatch	·	700 m	MPC · JPL
875518	2004 RY_{275}	—	September 13, 2004	Kitt Peak	Spacewatch	LIX	3.4 km	MPC · JPL
875519	2004 RH_{279}	—	September 15, 2004	Kitt Peak	Spacewatch	·	710 m	MPC · JPL
875520	2004 RR_{292}	—	September 10, 2004	Kitt Peak	Spacewatch	·	460 m	MPC · JPL
875521	2004 RL_{295}	—	September 11, 2004	Kitt Peak	Spacewatch	(5)	930 m	MPC · JPL
875522	2004 RG_{353}	—	September 12, 2004	Mauna Kea	P. A. Wiegert, S. Popa	·	930 m	MPC · JPL
875523	2004 RY_{364}	—	November 9, 2008	Kitt Peak	Spacewatch	·	700 m	MPC · JPL
875524	2004 RK_{365}	—	September 6, 2004	Siding Spring	SSS	·	410 m	MPC · JPL
875525	2004 SX_{64}	—	November 22, 2012	Kitt Peak	Spacewatch	·	830 m	MPC · JPL
875526	2004 TX_{15}	—	October 8, 2004	Anderson Mesa	LONEOS	·	1.2 km	MPC · JPL
875527	2004 TH_{43}	—	October 4, 2004	Kitt Peak	Spacewatch	·	940 m	MPC · JPL
875528	2004 TL_{54}	—	October 4, 2004	Kitt Peak	Spacewatch	·	540 m	MPC · JPL
875529	2004 TG_{81}	—	October 5, 2004	Kitt Peak	Spacewatch	·	1.7 km	MPC · JPL
875530	2004 TJ_{96}	—	September 17, 2004	Kitt Peak	Spacewatch	·	850 m	MPC · JPL
875531	2004 TE_{121}	—	September 18, 2004	Socorro	LINEAR	·	540 m	MPC · JPL
875532	2004 TJ_{141}	—	October 4, 2004	Kitt Peak	Spacewatch	·	1.1 km	MPC · JPL
875533	2004 TP_{141}	—	August 22, 2004	Siding Spring	SSS	·	450 m	MPC · JPL
875534	2004 TG_{188}	—	October 7, 2004	Kitt Peak	Spacewatch	·	700 m	MPC · JPL
875535	2004 TN_{197}	—	October 7, 2004	Kitt Peak	Spacewatch	·	540 m	MPC · JPL
875536	2004 TX_{200}	—	October 7, 2004	Kitt Peak	Spacewatch	·	570 m	MPC · JPL
875537	2004 TO_{201}	—	October 7, 2004	Kitt Peak	Spacewatch	critical	1.7 km	MPC · JPL
875538	2004 TX_{224}	—	October 8, 2004	Kitt Peak	Spacewatch	EUN	970 m	MPC · JPL
875539	2004 TV_{248}	—	October 7, 2004	Kitt Peak	Spacewatch	HNS	690 m	MPC · JPL
875540	2004 TZ_{255}	—	October 9, 2004	Anderson Mesa	LONEOS	·	1.1 km	MPC · JPL
875541	2004 TW_{256}	—	October 9, 2004	Kitt Peak	Spacewatch	(5)	700 m	MPC · JPL
875542	2004 TZ_{271}	—	October 9, 2004	Kitt Peak	Spacewatch	(18466)	1.7 km	MPC · JPL
875543	2004 TJ_{289}	—	October 10, 2004	Kitt Peak	Spacewatch	critical	510 m	MPC · JPL
875544	2004 TA_{290}	—	October 10, 2004	Kitt Peak	Spacewatch	ADE · critical	1.1 km	MPC · JPL
875545	2004 TN_{290}	—	October 10, 2004	Kitt Peak	Spacewatch	H	260 m	MPC · JPL
875546	2004 TP_{308}	—	October 10, 2004	Kitt Peak	Spacewatch	·	1.1 km	MPC · JPL
875547	2004 TB_{340}	—	October 13, 2004	Kitt Peak	Spacewatch	·	720 m	MPC · JPL
875548	2004 TY_{341}	—	October 13, 2004	Kitt Peak	Spacewatch	BAR	640 m	MPC · JPL
875549	2004 TE_{343}	—	October 13, 2004	Kitt Peak	Spacewatch	·	880 m	MPC · JPL
875550	2004 TX_{362}	—	October 11, 2004	Kitt Peak	Spacewatch	AEO	860 m	MPC · JPL
875551	2004 TC_{379}	—	September 21, 2011	Mount Lemmon	Mount Lemmon Survey	·	650 m	MPC · JPL
875552	2004 TJ_{379}	—	October 9, 2004	Kitt Peak	Spacewatch	·	550 m	MPC · JPL
875553	2004 TZ_{381}	—	October 10, 2004	Kitt Peak	Spacewatch	·	610 m	MPC · JPL
875554	2004 TZ_{385}	—	October 6, 2004	Kitt Peak	Spacewatch	·	1.3 km	MPC · JPL
875555	2004 TW_{387}	—	October 7, 2004	Kitt Peak	Spacewatch	·	860 m	MPC · JPL
875556	2004 UL_{3}	—	October 10, 2004	Socorro	LINEAR	·	850 m	MPC · JPL
875557	2004 VU_{27}	—	November 5, 2004	Palomar	NEAT	·	1.3 km	MPC · JPL
875558	2004 VA_{78}	—	September 3, 2008	Kitt Peak	Spacewatch	(5)	800 m	MPC · JPL
875559	2004 VZ_{89}	—	November 11, 2004	Kitt Peak	Spacewatch	EUN	650 m	MPC · JPL
875560	2004 VJ_{118}	—	November 9, 2004	Mauna Kea	P. A. Wiegert, A. Papadimos	·	620 m	MPC · JPL
875561	2004 VY_{133}	—	October 8, 2008	Mount Lemmon	Mount Lemmon Survey	·	980 m	MPC · JPL
875562	2004 VU_{138}	—	November 4, 2004	Kitt Peak	Spacewatch	·	770 m	MPC · JPL
875563	2004 VY_{138}	—	November 11, 2004	Kitt Peak	Spacewatch	·	1.2 km	MPC · JPL
875564	2004 WJ_{14}	—	November 20, 2004	Kitt Peak	Spacewatch	·	1.6 km	MPC · JPL
875565	2004 XL_{29}	—	December 11, 2004	Kitt Peak	Spacewatch	APO	560 m	MPC · JPL
875566	2004 XB_{36}	—	December 10, 2004	Kitt Peak	Spacewatch	·	1.6 km	MPC · JPL
875567	2004 XE_{50}	—	December 13, 2004	Kitt Peak	Spacewatch	PHO	840 m	MPC · JPL
875568	2004 XK_{120}	—	December 13, 2004	Kitt Peak	Spacewatch	·	820 m	MPC · JPL
875569	2004 XW_{185}	—	December 13, 2004	Kitt Peak	Spacewatch	·	920 m	MPC · JPL
875570	2004 XA_{197}	—	July 25, 2014	Haleakala	Pan-STARRS 1	·	580 m	MPC · JPL
875571	2004 XM_{198}	—	October 22, 2009	Mount Lemmon	Mount Lemmon Survey	·	1.0 km	MPC · JPL
875572	2004 XT_{199}	—	October 8, 2008	Mount Lemmon	Mount Lemmon Survey	·	1.0 km	MPC · JPL
875573	2004 XW_{199}	—	December 11, 2004	Bergisch Gladbach	W. Bickel	·	890 m	MPC · JPL
875574	2004 YH_{1}	—	December 19, 2004	Socorro	LINEAR	·	1.2 km	MPC · JPL
875575	2004 YD_{42}	—	December 18, 2004	Mount Lemmon	Mount Lemmon Survey	·	1.1 km	MPC · JPL
875576	2005 AL_{84}	—	August 2, 2016	Haleakala	Pan-STARRS 1	EUN	820 m	MPC · JPL
875577	2005 BS_{40}	—	November 19, 2012	Kitt Peak	Spacewatch	·	1.1 km	MPC · JPL
875578	2005 BJ_{44}	—	January 16, 2005	Mauna Kea	Veillet, C.	·	1.2 km	MPC · JPL
875579	2005 BH_{45}	—	January 16, 2005	Mauna Kea	Veillet, C.	TIN	850 m	MPC · JPL
875580	2005 BF_{57}	—	January 19, 2005	Kitt Peak	Spacewatch	ADE	1.2 km	MPC · JPL
875581	2005 CZ_{69}	—	February 8, 2005	Mauna Kea	Veillet, C.	·	1.8 km	MPC · JPL
875582	2005 CA_{70}	—	February 8, 2005	Mauna Kea	Veillet, C.	EOS	1.4 km	MPC · JPL
875583	2005 CZ_{89}	—	February 14, 2005	Kitt Peak	Spacewatch	·	900 m	MPC · JPL
875584	2005 EA_{4}	—	March 1, 2005	Kitt Peak	Spacewatch	·	1.5 km	MPC · JPL
875585	2005 EF_{70}	—	March 1, 2005	Kitt Peak	Spacewatch	fast	1.4 km	MPC · JPL
875586	2005 EO_{95}	—	February 1, 2005	Kitt Peak	Spacewatch	·	1.2 km	MPC · JPL
875587	2005 EM_{121}	—	March 8, 2005	Socorro	LINEAR	·	1.9 km	MPC · JPL
875588	2005 EC_{123}	—	March 8, 2005	Kitt Peak	Spacewatch	·	1.1 km	MPC · JPL
875589	2005 EV_{134}	—	February 18, 2005	La Silla	A. Boattini, H. Scholl	·	940 m	MPC · JPL
875590	2005 EV_{164}	—	March 11, 2005	Kitt Peak	Spacewatch	·	1.3 km	MPC · JPL
875591	2005 EO_{175}	—	March 8, 2005	Kitt Peak	Spacewatch	(1547)	1 km	MPC · JPL
875592	2005 EE_{219}	—	March 10, 2005	Mount Lemmon	Mount Lemmon Survey	·	1.3 km	MPC · JPL
875593	2005 EA_{225}	—	March 12, 2005	Socorro	LINEAR	PHO	810 m	MPC · JPL
875594	2005 EY_{248}	—	March 12, 2005	Mount Lemmon	Mount Lemmon Survey	·	990 m	MPC · JPL
875595	2005 EJ_{278}	—	February 6, 2016	Haleakala	Pan-STARRS 1	MAS	490 m	MPC · JPL
875596	2005 ET_{280}	—	March 10, 2005	Anderson Mesa	LONEOS	·	800 m	MPC · JPL
875597	2005 EZ_{291}	—	March 10, 2005	Catalina	CSS	·	1.9 km	MPC · JPL
875598	2005 EJ_{303}	—	March 11, 2005	Kitt Peak	Deep Ecliptic Survey	THM	1.6 km	MPC · JPL
875599	2005 EA_{306}	—	March 4, 2005	Mount Lemmon	Mount Lemmon Survey	·	1.9 km	MPC · JPL
875600	2005 EY_{308}	—	March 9, 2005	Mount Lemmon	Mount Lemmon Survey	JUN	670 m	MPC · JPL

== 875601–875700 ==
back to top

Designation			Discovery			Properties		Ref
Permanent	Provisional	Named after	Date	Site	Discoverer(s)	Category	Diam.	Ref
875601	2005 EH_{310}	—	March 10, 2005	Mount Lemmon	Mount Lemmon Survey	THM	1.3 km	MPC · JPL
875602	2005 EP_{313}	—	March 10, 2005	Mount Lemmon	Mount Lemmon Survey	·	1.6 km	MPC · JPL
875603	2005 EH_{327}	—	July 25, 2017	Haleakala	Pan-STARRS 1	·	1.6 km	MPC · JPL
875604	2005 ET_{337}	—	September 14, 2013	Mount Lemmon	Mount Lemmon Survey	H	350 m	MPC · JPL
875605	2005 EA_{343}	—	September 15, 2007	Mount Lemmon	Mount Lemmon Survey	·	650 m	MPC · JPL
875606	2005 EG_{343}	—	January 14, 2016	Haleakala	Pan-STARRS 1	·	1.9 km	MPC · JPL
875607	2005 ED_{348}	—	March 9, 2005	Mount Lemmon	Mount Lemmon Survey	MAS	510 m	MPC · JPL
875608	2005 ET_{348}	—	March 14, 2005	Mount Lemmon	Mount Lemmon Survey	3:2	3.8 km	MPC · JPL
875609	2005 EG_{349}	—	March 8, 2005	Mount Lemmon	Mount Lemmon Survey	THM	1.7 km	MPC · JPL
875610	2005 EW_{351}	—	March 8, 2005	Kitt Peak	Spacewatch	·	1.2 km	MPC · JPL
875611	2005 FJ_{17}	—	March 17, 2005	Kitt Peak	Spacewatch	(13314)	1.3 km	MPC · JPL
875612	2005 FV_{19}	—	March 17, 2005	Mount Lemmon	Mount Lemmon Survey	·	1.3 km	MPC · JPL
875613	2005 GW_{45}	—	April 5, 2005	Mount Lemmon	Mount Lemmon Survey	·	1.7 km	MPC · JPL
875614	2005 GH_{63}	—	April 2, 2005	Mount Lemmon	Mount Lemmon Survey	·	930 m	MPC · JPL
875615	2005 GQ_{107}	—	April 1, 2005	Kitt Peak	Spacewatch	H	480 m	MPC · JPL
875616	2005 GC_{130}	—	April 7, 2005	Mount Lemmon	Mount Lemmon Survey	·	1.8 km	MPC · JPL
875617	2005 GW_{132}	—	April 10, 2005	Kitt Peak	Spacewatch	·	1.1 km	MPC · JPL
875618	2005 GX_{206}	—	April 11, 2005	Palomar Mountain	H. G. Roe, M. E. Brown, K. M. Barkume	·	156 km	MPC · JPL
875619	2005 GZ_{231}	—	April 1, 2005	Kitt Peak	Spacewatch	JUN	720 m	MPC · JPL
875620	2005 GP_{233}	—	March 15, 2013	Mount Lemmon	Mount Lemmon Survey	·	690 m	MPC · JPL
875621	2005 GR_{233}	—	April 11, 2005	Kitt Peak	Deep Ecliptic Survey	·	1.9 km	MPC · JPL
875622	2005 GZ_{239}	—	April 15, 2005	Kitt Peak	Spacewatch	·	2.3 km	MPC · JPL
875623	2005 HS_{12}	—	April 17, 2005	Kitt Peak	Spacewatch	PAD	1.3 km	MPC · JPL
875624	2005 JA_{21}	—	May 4, 2005	Mount Lemmon	Mount Lemmon Survey	(1547)	1.1 km	MPC · JPL
875625	2005 JS_{26}	—	May 3, 2005	Kitt Peak	Spacewatch	·	1.3 km	MPC · JPL
875626	2005 JX_{39}	—	May 7, 2005	Mount Lemmon	Mount Lemmon Survey	·	2.1 km	MPC · JPL
875627	2005 JR_{57}	—	May 7, 2005	Kitt Peak	Spacewatch	·	680 m	MPC · JPL
875628	2005 JH_{78}	—	May 10, 2005	Mount Lemmon	Mount Lemmon Survey	·	2.1 km	MPC · JPL
875629	2005 JG_{84}	—	April 10, 2005	Mount Lemmon	Mount Lemmon Survey	·	1.5 km	MPC · JPL
875630	2005 JM_{125}	—	May 11, 2005	Kitt Peak	Spacewatch	·	500 m	MPC · JPL
875631	2005 JN_{142}	—	May 16, 2005	Palomar	NEAT	·	830 m	MPC · JPL
875632	2005 JC_{143}	—	May 15, 2005	Mount Lemmon	Mount Lemmon Survey	·	2.2 km	MPC · JPL
875633	2005 JR_{145}	—	May 12, 2005	Catalina	CSS	·	2.0 km	MPC · JPL
875634	2005 JM_{177}	—	May 7, 2005	Mount Lemmon	Mount Lemmon Survey	·	590 m	MPC · JPL
875635	2005 JU_{189}	—	May 9, 2005	Kitt Peak	Spacewatch	TIR	2.3 km	MPC · JPL
875636	2005 JU_{190}	—	November 24, 2011	Mount Lemmon	Mount Lemmon Survey	·	680 m	MPC · JPL
875637	2005 KN_{16}	—	May 16, 2005	Mount Lemmon	Mount Lemmon Survey	·	920 m	MPC · JPL
875638	2005 LY_{57}	—	April 30, 2014	Haleakala	Pan-STARRS 1	·	1.3 km	MPC · JPL
875639	2005 MO_{20}	—	June 30, 2005	Kitt Peak	Spacewatch	·	570 m	MPC · JPL
875640	2005 NH_{21}	—	July 1, 2005	Kitt Peak	Spacewatch	·	1.5 km	MPC · JPL
875641	2005 NE_{46}	—	June 17, 2005	Mount Lemmon	Mount Lemmon Survey	·	1.6 km	MPC · JPL
875642	2005 NM_{124}	—	December 9, 2016	Mount Lemmon	Mount Lemmon Survey	·	1.7 km	MPC · JPL
875643	2005 NO_{133}	—	July 5, 2005	Siding Spring	R. H. McNaught	·	840 m	MPC · JPL
875644	2005 OT_{28}	—	July 31, 2005	Palomar	NEAT	·	480 m	MPC · JPL
875645	2005 OO_{29}	—	July 31, 2005	Mauna Kea	P. A. Wiegert, D. D. Balam	·	1.3 km	MPC · JPL
875646	2005 OY_{29}	—	July 31, 2005	Mauna Kea	P. A. Wiegert, D. D. Balam	·	1.1 km	MPC · JPL
875647	2005 PE_{8}	—	August 4, 2005	Palomar	NEAT	·	510 m	MPC · JPL
875648	2005 QK_{11}	—	July 31, 2005	Palomar	NEAT	·	840 m	MPC · JPL
875649	2005 QB_{15}	—	July 30, 2005	Palomar	NEAT	·	920 m	MPC · JPL
875650	2005 QF_{46}	—	August 28, 2005	Kitt Peak	Spacewatch	·	870 m	MPC · JPL
875651	2005 QN_{88}	—	August 27, 2005	Anderson Mesa	LONEOS	·	1.2 km	MPC · JPL
875652	2005 QX_{126}	—	August 28, 2005	Kitt Peak	Spacewatch	THM	1.8 km	MPC · JPL
875653	2005 QO_{194}	—	September 14, 2013	Haleakala	Pan-STARRS 1	·	1.0 km	MPC · JPL
875654	2005 QK_{203}	—	August 30, 2005	Kitt Peak	Spacewatch	EUN	760 m	MPC · JPL
875655	2005 QK_{206}	—	August 30, 2005	Kitt Peak	Spacewatch	·	1.0 km	MPC · JPL
875656	2005 RS_{34}	—	September 3, 2005	Mauna Kea	Veillet, C.	·	1.3 km	MPC · JPL
875657	2005 RO_{62}	—	September 1, 2005	Kitt Peak	Spacewatch	THM	1.8 km	MPC · JPL
875658	2005 SF_{2}	—	September 22, 2005	Palomar	NEAT	·	1.2 km	MPC · JPL
875659	2005 ST_{38}	—	September 24, 2005	Kitt Peak	Spacewatch	critical	460 m	MPC · JPL
875660	2005 SG_{55}	—	September 25, 2005	Kitt Peak	Spacewatch	·	1.6 km	MPC · JPL
875661	2005 SR_{86}	—	September 24, 2005	Kitt Peak	Spacewatch	·	570 m	MPC · JPL
875662	2005 SH_{106}	—	September 13, 2005	Kitt Peak	Spacewatch	·	1.1 km	MPC · JPL
875663	2005 SZ_{130}	—	September 29, 2005	Mount Lemmon	Mount Lemmon Survey	·	1.5 km	MPC · JPL
875664	2005 SV_{151}	—	September 25, 2005	Kitt Peak	Spacewatch	T_{j} (2.97)	3.5 km	MPC · JPL
875665	2005 SN_{169}	—	September 29, 2005	Kitt Peak	Spacewatch	·	400 m	MPC · JPL
875666	2005 SJ_{187}	—	September 29, 2005	Anderson Mesa	LONEOS	·	480 m	MPC · JPL
875667	2005 SP_{272}	—	September 30, 2005	Mount Lemmon	Mount Lemmon Survey	·	800 m	MPC · JPL
875668	2005 SQ_{284}	—	September 27, 2005	Apache Point	SDSS Collaboration	·	1.4 km	MPC · JPL
875669	2005 SF_{296}	—	September 27, 2009	Kitt Peak	Spacewatch	·	690 m	MPC · JPL
875670	2005 SY_{296}	—	August 3, 2016	Haleakala	Pan-STARRS 1	TIR	1.8 km	MPC · JPL
875671	2005 SS_{299}	—	September 15, 2017	Haleakala	Pan-STARRS 1	·	580 m	MPC · JPL
875672	2005 SO_{300}	—	September 29, 2005	Mount Lemmon	Mount Lemmon Survey	·	480 m	MPC · JPL
875673	2005 TZ_{140}	—	October 8, 2005	Kitt Peak	Spacewatch	·	530 m	MPC · JPL
875674	2005 TY_{148}	—	October 8, 2005	Kitt Peak	Spacewatch	·	510 m	MPC · JPL
875675	2005 TO_{153}	—	October 7, 2005	Mount Lemmon	Mount Lemmon Survey	·	1.1 km	MPC · JPL
875676	2005 TJ_{173}	—	October 13, 2005	Kitt Peak	Spacewatch	·	520 m	MPC · JPL
875677	2005 TF_{192}	—	October 8, 2005	Socorro	LINEAR	·	1.0 km	MPC · JPL
875678	2005 TL_{198}	—	October 12, 2005	Kitt Peak	Spacewatch	LIX	2.3 km	MPC · JPL
875679	2005 TA_{200}	—	October 11, 2005	Anderson Mesa	LONEOS	PHO	800 m	MPC · JPL
875680	2005 TL_{201}	—	October 13, 2005	Kitt Peak	Spacewatch	·	820 m	MPC · JPL
875681	2005 TH_{202}	—	September 28, 2013	Mount Lemmon	Mount Lemmon Survey	·	540 m	MPC · JPL
875682	2005 TS_{203}	—	July 7, 2010	WISE	WISE	·	1.4 km	MPC · JPL
875683	2005 TC_{208}	—	October 25, 2014	Haleakala	Pan-STARRS 1	·	1.2 km	MPC · JPL
875684	2005 TK_{210}	—	October 11, 2005	Kitt Peak	Spacewatch	·	1.5 km	MPC · JPL
875685	2005 UT	—	October 5, 2005	Kitt Peak	Spacewatch	·	490 m	MPC · JPL
875686	2005 UY_{10}	—	October 1, 2005	Mount Lemmon	Mount Lemmon Survey	·	460 m	MPC · JPL
875687	2005 UR_{31}	—	October 24, 2005	Kitt Peak	Spacewatch	·	1.1 km	MPC · JPL
875688	2005 UZ_{80}	—	October 1, 2005	Mount Lemmon	Mount Lemmon Survey	·	520 m	MPC · JPL
875689	2005 UU_{113}	—	October 22, 2005	Kitt Peak	Spacewatch	·	830 m	MPC · JPL
875690	2005 UJ_{117}	—	October 1, 2005	Mount Lemmon	Mount Lemmon Survey	·	1.3 km	MPC · JPL
875691	2005 UT_{119}	—	October 24, 2005	Kitt Peak	Spacewatch	RAF	680 m	MPC · JPL
875692	2005 UN_{199}	—	October 25, 2005	Kitt Peak	Spacewatch	·	1.3 km	MPC · JPL
875693	2005 UJ_{224}	—	October 25, 2005	Kitt Peak	Spacewatch	·	710 m	MPC · JPL
875694	2005 UA_{233}	—	October 1, 2005	Mount Lemmon	Mount Lemmon Survey	·	1.4 km	MPC · JPL
875695	2005 UB_{282}	—	October 25, 2005	Mount Lemmon	Mount Lemmon Survey	·	530 m	MPC · JPL
875696	2005 UC_{285}	—	October 26, 2005	Kitt Peak	Spacewatch	·	1.2 km	MPC · JPL
875697	2005 UQ_{289}	—	October 26, 2005	Kitt Peak	Spacewatch	·	840 m	MPC · JPL
875698	2005 UJ_{301}	—	October 26, 2005	Kitt Peak	Spacewatch	·	750 m	MPC · JPL
875699	2005 US_{306}	—	October 27, 2005	Mount Lemmon	Mount Lemmon Survey	·	420 m	MPC · JPL
875700	2005 UB_{320}	—	October 27, 2005	Kitt Peak	Spacewatch	·	780 m	MPC · JPL

== 875701–875800 ==
back to top

Designation			Discovery			Properties		Ref
Permanent	Provisional	Named after	Date	Site	Discoverer(s)	Category	Diam.	Ref
875701	2005 UU_{320}	—	October 27, 2005	Kitt Peak	Spacewatch	·	350 m	MPC · JPL
875702	2005 UB_{332}	—	October 29, 2005	Kitt Peak	Spacewatch	·	1.2 km	MPC · JPL
875703	2005 UQ_{345}	—	October 12, 2005	Kitt Peak	Spacewatch	·	1.1 km	MPC · JPL
875704	2005 UB_{367}	—	October 22, 2005	Kitt Peak	Spacewatch	·	1.9 km	MPC · JPL
875705	2005 UQ_{383}	—	September 30, 2005	Mount Lemmon	Mount Lemmon Survey	·	530 m	MPC · JPL
875706	2005 UE_{393}	—	October 1, 2005	Mount Lemmon	Mount Lemmon Survey	·	2.2 km	MPC · JPL
875707	2005 UK_{409}	—	October 31, 2005	Mount Lemmon	Mount Lemmon Survey	·	1.2 km	MPC · JPL
875708	2005 UA_{429}	—	October 1, 2005	Mount Lemmon	Mount Lemmon Survey	·	1.1 km	MPC · JPL
875709	2005 UN_{437}	—	October 22, 2005	Kitt Peak	Spacewatch	·	1.2 km	MPC · JPL
875710	2005 UY_{467}	—	October 30, 2005	Kitt Peak	Spacewatch	KRM	1.3 km	MPC · JPL
875711	2005 UN_{469}	—	October 26, 2005	Kitt Peak	Spacewatch	·	550 m	MPC · JPL
875712	2005 UW_{518}	—	October 25, 2005	Apache Point	SDSS Collaboration	·	590 m	MPC · JPL
875713	2005 UA_{522}	—	October 27, 2005	Apache Point	SDSS Collaboration	·	1.4 km	MPC · JPL
875714	2005 UR_{537}	—	October 22, 2005	Kitt Peak	Spacewatch	·	520 m	MPC · JPL
875715	2005 UB_{538}	—	November 24, 2009	Mount Lemmon	Mount Lemmon Survey	·	860 m	MPC · JPL
875716	2005 UU_{540}	—	October 25, 2005	Kitt Peak	Spacewatch	·	680 m	MPC · JPL
875717	2005 UG_{551}	—	October 28, 2005	Mount Lemmon	Mount Lemmon Survey	·	1.4 km	MPC · JPL
875718	2005 UU_{554}	—	October 27, 2005	Mount Lemmon	Mount Lemmon Survey	·	470 m	MPC · JPL
875719	2005 VA_{7}	—	November 12, 2005	Socorro	LINEAR	·	1.5 km	MPC · JPL
875720	2005 VE_{11}	—	November 3, 2005	Kitt Peak	Spacewatch	·	1.9 km	MPC · JPL
875721	2005 VH_{11}	—	November 3, 2005	Kitt Peak	Spacewatch	·	610 m	MPC · JPL
875722	2005 VX_{16}	—	October 1, 2005	Catalina	CSS	·	470 m	MPC · JPL
875723	2005 VF_{23}	—	October 24, 2005	Kitt Peak	Spacewatch	KOR	1.1 km	MPC · JPL
875724	2005 VR_{30}	—	November 4, 2005	Kitt Peak	Spacewatch	·	820 m	MPC · JPL
875725	2005 VO_{41}	—	November 4, 2005	Catalina	CSS	·	720 m	MPC · JPL
875726	2005 VU_{60}	—	October 24, 2005	Kitt Peak	Spacewatch	·	1.3 km	MPC · JPL
875727	2005 VS_{65}	—	November 5, 2005	Kitt Peak	Spacewatch	·	1.7 km	MPC · JPL
875728	2005 VV_{93}	—	November 6, 2005	Mount Lemmon	Mount Lemmon Survey	·	470 m	MPC · JPL
875729	2005 VR_{105}	—	October 25, 2005	Kitt Peak	Spacewatch	·	540 m	MPC · JPL
875730	2005 VL_{132}	—	October 30, 2005	Apache Point	SDSS Collaboration	critical	900 m	MPC · JPL
875731	2005 VF_{136}	—	November 12, 2005	Kitt Peak	Spacewatch	·	1.2 km	MPC · JPL
875732	2005 VX_{140}	—	September 27, 2009	LightBuckets	Cullen, S.	·	590 m	MPC · JPL
875733	2005 VR_{141}	—	November 11, 2009	Kitt Peak	Spacewatch	·	720 m	MPC · JPL
875734	2005 VW_{146}	—	April 18, 2015	Cerro Tololo	DECam	·	2.8 km	MPC · JPL
875735	2005 VQ_{148}	—	November 7, 2005	Mauna Kea	A. Boattini	(5)	840 m	MPC · JPL
875736	2005 VD_{151}	—	November 1, 2005	Mount Lemmon	Mount Lemmon Survey	·	570 m	MPC · JPL
875737	2005 VY_{151}	—	November 6, 2005	Mount Lemmon	Mount Lemmon Survey	·	710 m	MPC · JPL
875738	2005 VN_{152}	—	November 6, 2005	Kitt Peak	Spacewatch	·	740 m	MPC · JPL
875739	2005 VQ_{152}	—	November 10, 2005	Kitt Peak	Spacewatch	·	920 m	MPC · JPL
875740	2005 WE_{22}	—	October 30, 2005	Mount Lemmon	Mount Lemmon Survey	·	1.2 km	MPC · JPL
875741	2005 WR_{22}	—	November 12, 2005	Kitt Peak	Spacewatch	·	1.5 km	MPC · JPL
875742	2005 WM_{42}	—	November 21, 2005	Kitt Peak	Spacewatch	·	720 m	MPC · JPL
875743	2005 WA_{53}	—	November 25, 2005	Mount Lemmon	Mount Lemmon Survey	·	630 m	MPC · JPL
875744	2005 WG_{78}	—	November 25, 2005	Kitt Peak	Spacewatch	·	560 m	MPC · JPL
875745	2005 WO_{81}	—	November 28, 2005	Kitt Peak	Spacewatch	·	600 m	MPC · JPL
875746	2005 WH_{98}	—	November 5, 2005	Catalina	CSS	H	410 m	MPC · JPL
875747	2005 WM_{111}	—	October 3, 2005	Catalina	CSS	·	450 m	MPC · JPL
875748	2005 WH_{126}	—	November 25, 2005	Mount Lemmon	Mount Lemmon Survey	·	1.9 km	MPC · JPL
875749	2005 WB_{155}	—	November 29, 2005	Kitt Peak	Spacewatch	(5)	770 m	MPC · JPL
875750	2005 WR_{171}	—	November 30, 2005	Kitt Peak	Spacewatch	·	540 m	MPC · JPL
875751	2005 WX_{213}	—	November 12, 2013	Mount Lemmon	Mount Lemmon Survey	·	730 m	MPC · JPL
875752	2005 WZ_{213}	—	November 27, 2009	Mount Lemmon	Mount Lemmon Survey	·	750 m	MPC · JPL
875753	2005 WC_{214}	—	November 29, 2005	Kitt Peak	Spacewatch	·	2.3 km	MPC · JPL
875754	2005 XW_{4}	—	December 6, 2005	Socorro	LINEAR	APO	170 m	MPC · JPL
875755	2005 XU_{36}	—	December 4, 2005	Kitt Peak	Spacewatch	·	1.3 km	MPC · JPL
875756	2005 XX_{37}	—	December 4, 2005	Kitt Peak	Spacewatch	·	690 m	MPC · JPL
875757	2005 XN_{53}	—	October 29, 2005	Catalina	CSS	·	1.3 km	MPC · JPL
875758	2005 XM_{77}	—	December 8, 2005	Kitt Peak	Spacewatch	·	760 m	MPC · JPL
875759	2005 XT_{77}	—	December 10, 2005	Anderson Mesa	LONEOS	ATE · PHA	180 m	MPC · JPL
875760	2005 XY_{82}	—	November 6, 2005	Kitt Peak	Spacewatch	·	1.7 km	MPC · JPL
875761	2005 XF_{93}	—	December 1, 2005	Kitt Peak	L. H. Wasserman, R. L. Millis	·	2.1 km	MPC · JPL
875762	2005 XT_{116}	—	December 6, 2005	Kitt Peak	Spacewatch	EUN	800 m	MPC · JPL
875763	2005 XZ_{122}	—	November 11, 2013	Kitt Peak	Spacewatch	·	700 m	MPC · JPL
875764	2005 XU_{127}	—	July 28, 2014	Haleakala	Pan-STARRS 1	·	1.4 km	MPC · JPL
875765	2005 XQ_{130}	—	September 22, 2014	Haleakala	Pan-STARRS 1	KOR	1.1 km	MPC · JPL
875766	2005 XY_{131}	—	December 8, 2005	Kitt Peak	Spacewatch	·	430 m	MPC · JPL
875767	2005 YU_{63}	—	December 2, 2005	Mount Lemmon	Mount Lemmon Survey	·	970 m	MPC · JPL
875768	2005 YX_{71}	—	December 10, 2005	Kitt Peak	Spacewatch	·	1.1 km	MPC · JPL
875769	2005 YW_{81}	—	December 24, 2005	Kitt Peak	Spacewatch	·	670 m	MPC · JPL
875770	2005 YZ_{96}	—	December 24, 2005	Kitt Peak	Spacewatch	H	510 m	MPC · JPL
875771	2005 YM_{150}	—	December 25, 2005	Kitt Peak	Spacewatch	·	600 m	MPC · JPL
875772	2005 YX_{175}	—	December 22, 2005	Kitt Peak	Spacewatch	DOR	1.5 km	MPC · JPL
875773	2005 YK_{228}	—	December 25, 2005	Kitt Peak	Spacewatch	·	1.3 km	MPC · JPL
875774	2005 YA_{242}	—	December 30, 2005	Kitt Peak	Spacewatch	EUN	890 m	MPC · JPL
875775	2005 YV_{242}	—	December 30, 2005	Kitt Peak	Spacewatch	(5)	580 m	MPC · JPL
875776	2005 YD_{256}	—	December 30, 2005	Kitt Peak	Spacewatch	(5)	690 m	MPC · JPL
875777	2005 YG_{286}	—	December 30, 2005	Kitt Peak	Spacewatch	·	950 m	MPC · JPL
875778	2005 YD_{297}	—	October 27, 2017	Haleakala	Pan-STARRS 1	EUN	840 m	MPC · JPL
875779	2005 YW_{299}	—	November 8, 2010	Kitt Peak	Spacewatch	·	1.2 km	MPC · JPL
875780	2006 AO_{10}	—	December 28, 2005	Kitt Peak	Spacewatch	EUN	780 m	MPC · JPL
875781	2006 AW_{63}	—	December 30, 2005	Kitt Peak	Spacewatch	·	740 m	MPC · JPL
875782	2006 AF_{65}	—	December 30, 2005	Kitt Peak	Spacewatch	·	800 m	MPC · JPL
875783	2006 AN_{87}	—	January 4, 2006	Kitt Peak	Spacewatch	·	1.5 km	MPC · JPL
875784	2006 AP_{108}	—	January 10, 2006	Mount Lemmon	Mount Lemmon Survey	·	1.4 km	MPC · JPL
875785	2006 AO_{110}	—	January 8, 2006	Mount Lemmon	Mount Lemmon Survey	(5)	770 m	MPC · JPL
875786	2006 BC	—	January 19, 2006	Socorro	LINEAR	APO	500 m	MPC · JPL
875787	2006 BF_{3}	—	January 7, 2006	Mount Lemmon	Mount Lemmon Survey	EOS	1.3 km	MPC · JPL
875788	2006 BV_{12}	—	January 21, 2006	Mount Lemmon	Mount Lemmon Survey	·	1.5 km	MPC · JPL
875789	2006 BO_{23}	—	January 23, 2006	Mount Lemmon	Mount Lemmon Survey	·	630 m	MPC · JPL
875790	2006 BG_{58}	—	January 23, 2006	Mount Lemmon	Mount Lemmon Survey	·	740 m	MPC · JPL
875791	2006 BK_{68}	—	January 23, 2006	Kitt Peak	Spacewatch	·	1.3 km	MPC · JPL
875792	2006 BH_{73}	—	January 23, 2006	Kitt Peak	Spacewatch	·	770 m	MPC · JPL
875793	2006 BW_{80}	—	March 9, 2002	Kitt Peak	Spacewatch	·	810 m	MPC · JPL
875794	2006 BP_{113}	—	January 25, 2006	Kitt Peak	Spacewatch	·	780 m	MPC · JPL
875795	2006 BY_{125}	—	January 26, 2006	Kitt Peak	Spacewatch	·	1.4 km	MPC · JPL
875796	2006 BJ_{151}	—	January 25, 2006	Kitt Peak	Spacewatch	·	1.4 km	MPC · JPL
875797	2006 BQ_{168}	—	January 6, 2006	Mount Lemmon	Mount Lemmon Survey	·	720 m	MPC · JPL
875798	2006 BQ_{175}	—	January 27, 2006	Kitt Peak	Spacewatch	EUN	820 m	MPC · JPL
875799	2006 BC_{211}	—	January 31, 2006	Kitt Peak	Spacewatch	·	540 m	MPC · JPL
875800	2006 BY_{218}	—	January 25, 2006	Kitt Peak	Spacewatch	NYS	570 m	MPC · JPL

== 875801–875900 ==
back to top

Designation			Discovery			Properties		Ref
Permanent	Provisional	Named after	Date	Site	Discoverer(s)	Category	Diam.	Ref
875801	2006 BW_{236}	—	January 31, 2006	Kitt Peak	Spacewatch	·	1.0 km	MPC · JPL
875802	2006 BO_{245}	—	January 31, 2006	Kitt Peak	Spacewatch	(5)	660 m	MPC · JPL
875803	2006 BG_{288}	—	January 31, 2006	Kitt Peak	Spacewatch	·	640 m	MPC · JPL
875804	2006 BE_{290}	—	January 22, 2006	Mount Lemmon	Mount Lemmon Survey	·	1.2 km	MPC · JPL
875805	2006 BV_{292}	—	January 26, 2006	Mount Lemmon	Mount Lemmon Survey	·	890 m	MPC · JPL
875806	2006 BH_{294}	—	January 23, 2006	Mount Lemmon	Mount Lemmon Survey	·	860 m	MPC · JPL
875807	2006 BN_{300}	—	January 27, 2006	Mount Lemmon	Mount Lemmon Survey	·	1.9 km	MPC · JPL
875808	2006 BR_{301}	—	January 26, 2006	Mount Lemmon	Mount Lemmon Survey	·	830 m	MPC · JPL
875809	2006 BD_{303}	—	January 26, 2006	Mount Lemmon	Mount Lemmon Survey	·	1.5 km	MPC · JPL
875810	2006 CJ_{3}	—	February 1, 2006	Mount Lemmon	Mount Lemmon Survey	·	1.9 km	MPC · JPL
875811	2006 CC_{4}	—	February 1, 2006	Mount Lemmon	Mount Lemmon Survey	(5)	790 m	MPC · JPL
875812	2006 CT_{52}	—	February 4, 2006	Kitt Peak	Spacewatch	BRG	890 m	MPC · JPL
875813	2006 CR_{55}	—	February 4, 2006	Mount Lemmon	Mount Lemmon Survey	(5)	880 m	MPC · JPL
875814	2006 CK_{70}	—	February 3, 2006	Mauna Kea	P. A. Wiegert, R. Rasmussen	·	1.4 km	MPC · JPL
875815	2006 CF_{88}	—	January 12, 2011	Mount Lemmon	Mount Lemmon Survey	EOS	1.1 km	MPC · JPL
875816	2006 CU_{91}	—	February 4, 2006	Kitt Peak	Spacewatch	·	870 m	MPC · JPL
875817	2006 DR_{11}	—	January 8, 2006	Kitt Peak	Spacewatch	·	1.2 km	MPC · JPL
875818	2006 DO_{49}	—	February 21, 2006	Mount Lemmon	Mount Lemmon Survey	·	1.4 km	MPC · JPL
875819	2006 DE_{55}	—	February 24, 2006	Kitt Peak	Spacewatch	·	1.3 km	MPC · JPL
875820	2006 DO_{58}	—	February 24, 2006	Mount Lemmon	Mount Lemmon Survey	·	940 m	MPC · JPL
875821	2006 DH_{137}	—	February 25, 2006	Kitt Peak	Spacewatch	·	800 m	MPC · JPL
875822	2006 DF_{200}	—	April 14, 2002	Socorro	LINEAR	BAR	800 m	MPC · JPL
875823	2006 DD_{213}	—	February 25, 2006	Mount Lemmon	Mount Lemmon Survey	·	940 m	MPC · JPL
875824	2006 DF_{218}	—	February 24, 2006	Kitt Peak	Spacewatch	·	2.2 km	MPC · JPL
875825	2006 EC_{6}	—	January 30, 2006	Kitt Peak	Spacewatch	·	630 m	MPC · JPL
875826	2006 EZ_{6}	—	March 2, 2006	Kitt Peak	Spacewatch	EOS	1.3 km	MPC · JPL
875827	2006 EH_{23}	—	March 3, 2006	Kitt Peak	Spacewatch	·	1.6 km	MPC · JPL
875828	2006 EB_{50}	—	March 4, 2006	Kitt Peak	Spacewatch	·	1.9 km	MPC · JPL
875829	2006 EX_{63}	—	March 5, 2006	Kitt Peak	Spacewatch	·	790 m	MPC · JPL
875830	2006 EE_{81}	—	April 12, 2010	Mount Lemmon	Mount Lemmon Survey	·	730 m	MPC · JPL
875831	2006 EL_{82}	—	March 2, 2006	Mount Lemmon	Mount Lemmon Survey	KON	1.5 km	MPC · JPL
875832	2006 FJ	—	March 23, 2006	Kitt Peak	Spacewatch	APO	290 m	MPC · JPL
875833	2006 FC_{13}	—	March 23, 2006	Kitt Peak	Spacewatch	·	2.1 km	MPC · JPL
875834	2006 FX_{33}	—	January 9, 2006	Kitt Peak	Spacewatch	KON	1.5 km	MPC · JPL
875835	2006 FO_{57}	—	March 24, 2006	Kitt Peak	Spacewatch	·	1.9 km	MPC · JPL
875836	2006 FW_{59}	—	January 23, 2014	Catalina	CSS	·	1.1 km	MPC · JPL
875837	2006 GT_{2}	—	April 9, 2006	Mount Lemmon	Mount Lemmon Survey	H	400 m	MPC · JPL
875838	2006 GF_{5}	—	April 2, 2006	Kitt Peak	Spacewatch	·	1.3 km	MPC · JPL
875839	2006 GB_{57}	—	December 13, 2015	Haleakala	Pan-STARRS 1	·	1.7 km	MPC · JPL
875840	2006 HQ_{1}	—	April 18, 2006	Kitt Peak	Spacewatch	·	860 m	MPC · JPL
875841	2006 HU_{52}	—	April 18, 2006	Catalina	CSS	·	780 m	MPC · JPL
875842	2006 HC_{70}	—	April 24, 2006	Kitt Peak	Spacewatch	·	930 m	MPC · JPL
875843	2006 HO_{82}	—	April 26, 2006	Kitt Peak	Spacewatch	·	1.5 km	MPC · JPL
875844	2006 HO_{100}	—	April 26, 2006	Kitt Peak	Spacewatch	·	1.7 km	MPC · JPL
875845	2006 HB_{142}	—	April 27, 2006	Cerro Tololo	Deep Ecliptic Survey	·	1.6 km	MPC · JPL
875846	2006 HQ_{159}	—	September 11, 2007	Kitt Peak	Spacewatch	·	1.3 km	MPC · JPL
875847	2006 HB_{161}	—	April 29, 2006	Kitt Peak	Spacewatch	·	1.2 km	MPC · JPL
875848	2006 JC_{14}	—	May 4, 2006	Mount Lemmon	Mount Lemmon Survey	·	1.0 km	MPC · JPL
875849	2006 JW_{14}	—	May 1, 2006	Kitt Peak	Spacewatch	·	2.3 km	MPC · JPL
875850	2006 JU_{37}	—	May 5, 2006	Kitt Peak	Spacewatch	TIR	2.0 km	MPC · JPL
875851	2006 JS_{55}	—	May 1, 2006	Catalina	CSS	·	1.7 km	MPC · JPL
875852	2006 JY_{87}	—	May 1, 2006	Kitt Peak	Spacewatch	·	2.1 km	MPC · JPL
875853	2006 JR_{88}	—	May 6, 2006	Kitt Peak	Spacewatch	·	1.2 km	MPC · JPL
875854	2006 JQ_{90}	—	May 2, 2006	Mount Lemmon	Mount Lemmon Survey	·	2.5 km	MPC · JPL
875855	2006 KP_{19}	—	May 5, 2006	Kitt Peak	Spacewatch	·	1.2 km	MPC · JPL
875856	2006 KF_{76}	—	May 24, 2006	Kitt Peak	Spacewatch	·	970 m	MPC · JPL
875857	2006 KA_{109}	—	May 31, 2006	Mount Lemmon	Mount Lemmon Survey	·	1.0 km	MPC · JPL
875858	2006 KG_{135}	—	May 25, 2006	Mauna Kea	P. A. Wiegert	·	990 m	MPC · JPL
875859	2006 KP_{151}	—	November 20, 2008	Kitt Peak	Spacewatch	·	2.6 km	MPC · JPL
875860	2006 KR_{156}	—	April 19, 2006	Catalina	CSS	·	2.0 km	MPC · JPL
875861	2006 LG_{9}	—	March 3, 2016	Haleakala	Pan-STARRS 1	·	2.4 km	MPC · JPL
875862	2006 LR_{9}	—	June 4, 2006	Kitt Peak	Spacewatch	·	1.6 km	MPC · JPL
875863	2006 OT_{9}	—	July 25, 2006	Palomar	NEAT	APO	350 m	MPC · JPL
875864	2006 OT_{25}	—	July 19, 2006	Mauna Kea	P. A. Wiegert, D. Subasinghe	MAS	410 m	MPC · JPL
875865	2006 PT_{3}	—	August 14, 2006	Siding Spring	SSS	·	1.3 km	MPC · JPL
875866	2006 PC_{10}	—	August 13, 2006	Palomar	NEAT	·	1.5 km	MPC · JPL
875867	2006 PX_{33}	—	August 14, 2006	Siding Spring	SSS	·	1.1 km	MPC · JPL
875868	2006 PN_{41}	—	July 21, 2006	Mount Lemmon	Mount Lemmon Survey	·	450 m	MPC · JPL
875869	2006 QJ_{9}	—	August 19, 2006	Palomar	NEAT	·	780 m	MPC · JPL
875870	2006 QS_{14}	—	August 17, 2006	Palomar	NEAT	·	770 m	MPC · JPL
875871	2006 QM_{67}	—	August 21, 2006	Kitt Peak	Spacewatch	·	1.4 km	MPC · JPL
875872	2006 QS_{74}	—	August 21, 2006	Kitt Peak	Spacewatch	·	1.3 km	MPC · JPL
875873	2006 QH_{79}	—	August 23, 2006	Pian dei Termini	Osservatorio Astronomico della Montagna Pistoiese	TIN	760 m	MPC · JPL
875874	2006 QQ_{82}	—	August 19, 2006	Kitt Peak	Spacewatch	·	800 m	MPC · JPL
875875	2006 QD_{105}	—	August 28, 2006	Catalina	CSS	·	940 m	MPC · JPL
875876	2006 QJ_{124}	—	August 14, 2006	Siding Spring	SSS	·	1.1 km	MPC · JPL
875877	2006 QJ_{131}	—	August 22, 2006	Palomar	NEAT	·	1.2 km	MPC · JPL
875878	2006 QC_{138}	—	August 16, 2006	Palomar	NEAT	·	990 m	MPC · JPL
875879	2006 QO_{154}	—	August 19, 2006	Kitt Peak	Spacewatch	·	1 km	MPC · JPL
875880	2006 QX_{160}	—	August 19, 2006	Kitt Peak	Spacewatch	THM	1.5 km	MPC · JPL
875881	2006 QJ_{175}	—	August 22, 2006	Cerro Tololo	Deep Ecliptic Survey	·	2.4 km	MPC · JPL
875882	2006 QU_{192}	—	August 28, 2006	Kitt Peak	Spacewatch	·	1.4 km	MPC · JPL
875883	2006 QG_{194}	—	August 25, 2006	Siding Spring	SSS	·	1.1 km	MPC · JPL
875884	2006 QP_{194}	—	November 2, 2015	Haleakala	Pan-STARRS 1	·	1.0 km	MPC · JPL
875885	2006 QC_{196}	—	August 19, 2006	Kitt Peak	Spacewatch	·	1.1 km	MPC · JPL
875886	2006 QV_{205}	—	August 21, 2006	Kitt Peak	Spacewatch	·	1.3 km	MPC · JPL
875887	2006 QN_{209}	—	August 21, 2006	Kitt Peak	Spacewatch	·	1.8 km	MPC · JPL
875888	2006 QT_{209}	—	August 30, 2006	Anderson Mesa	LONEOS	·	1.1 km	MPC · JPL
875889	2006 RM_{46}	—	September 14, 2006	Kitt Peak	Spacewatch	MAR	740 m	MPC · JPL
875890	2006 RU_{54}	—	September 14, 2006	Kitt Peak	Spacewatch	·	820 m	MPC · JPL
875891	2006 RS_{55}	—	September 14, 2006	Kitt Peak	Spacewatch	·	1.4 km	MPC · JPL
875892	2006 RY_{78}	—	September 15, 2006	Kitt Peak	Spacewatch	MAS	510 m	MPC · JPL
875893	2006 RV_{87}	—	September 15, 2006	Kitt Peak	Spacewatch	ERI	1.0 km	MPC · JPL
875894	2006 RJ_{107}	—	September 14, 2006	Mauna Kea	Masiero, J., R. Jedicke	HOF	1.7 km	MPC · JPL
875895	2006 RW_{111}	—	September 14, 2006	Mauna Kea	Masiero, J., R. Jedicke	AGN	910 m	MPC · JPL
875896	2006 RF_{112}	—	September 14, 2006	Mauna Kea	Masiero, J., R. Jedicke	KOR	880 m	MPC · JPL
875897	2006 RG_{113}	—	September 14, 2006	Mauna Kea	Masiero, J., R. Jedicke	·	1.1 km	MPC · JPL
875898	2006 RO_{115}	—	October 16, 2006	Mount Lemmon	Mount Lemmon Survey	MAS	510 m	MPC · JPL
875899	2006 RU_{115}	—	October 21, 2006	Mount Lemmon	Mount Lemmon Survey	·	1.5 km	MPC · JPL
875900	2006 RA_{117}	—	September 14, 2006	Mauna Kea	Masiero, J., R. Jedicke	·	1.4 km	MPC · JPL

== 875901–876000 ==
back to top

Designation			Discovery			Properties		Ref
Permanent	Provisional	Named after	Date	Site	Discoverer(s)	Category	Diam.	Ref
875901	2006 RQ_{124}	—	September 15, 2006	Kitt Peak	Spacewatch	·	1.2 km	MPC · JPL
875902	2006 SS_{1}	—	September 16, 2006	Kitt Peak	Spacewatch	·	460 m	MPC · JPL
875903	2006 SG_{25}	—	September 16, 2006	Kitt Peak	Spacewatch	·	1.4 km	MPC · JPL
875904	2006 SR_{78}	—	September 25, 2006	Kitt Peak	Spacewatch	APO	340 m	MPC · JPL
875905	2006 SZ_{80}	—	September 18, 2006	Kitt Peak	Spacewatch	·	370 m	MPC · JPL
875906	2006 SQ_{84}	—	September 18, 2006	Kitt Peak	Spacewatch	3:2	3.4 km	MPC · JPL
875907	2006 SJ_{87}	—	September 18, 2006	Kitt Peak	Spacewatch	·	910 m	MPC · JPL
875908	2006 SB_{90}	—	September 18, 2006	Kitt Peak	Spacewatch	·	710 m	MPC · JPL
875909	2006 SV_{102}	—	September 19, 2006	Kitt Peak	Spacewatch	MAS	470 m	MPC · JPL
875910	2006 SP_{105}	—	September 19, 2006	Kitt Peak	Spacewatch	·	1.2 km	MPC · JPL
875911	2006 SE_{107}	—	September 17, 2006	Kitt Peak	Spacewatch	GEF	880 m	MPC · JPL
875912	2006 SC_{110}	—	September 20, 2006	Eskridge	G. Hug, D. Tibbets	·	700 m	MPC · JPL
875913	2006 SA_{133}	—	September 16, 2006	Catalina	CSS	·	830 m	MPC · JPL
875914	2006 SL_{134}	—	September 27, 2006	Mount Lemmon	Mount Lemmon Survey	·	1.5 km	MPC · JPL
875915	2006 SN_{147}	—	September 19, 2006	Kitt Peak	Spacewatch	MAS	420 m	MPC · JPL
875916	2006 SH_{149}	—	September 19, 2006	Kitt Peak	Spacewatch	AGN	740 m	MPC · JPL
875917	2006 SW_{151}	—	September 19, 2006	Kitt Peak	Spacewatch	·	400 m	MPC · JPL
875918	2006 SX_{152}	—	August 21, 2006	Kitt Peak	Spacewatch	·	1.2 km	MPC · JPL
875919	2006 SR_{159}	—	September 23, 2006	Kitt Peak	Spacewatch	critical	840 m	MPC · JPL
875920	2006 SS_{164}	—	August 21, 2006	Kitt Peak	Spacewatch	DOR	1.6 km	MPC · JPL
875921	2006 SQ_{165}	—	September 25, 2006	Kitt Peak	Spacewatch	·	1.2 km	MPC · JPL
875922	2006 SX_{171}	—	September 17, 2006	Kitt Peak	Spacewatch	·	870 m	MPC · JPL
875923	2006 SH_{177}	—	September 25, 2006	Kitt Peak	Spacewatch	MAS	460 m	MPC · JPL
875924	2006 SL_{184}	—	September 17, 2006	Kitt Peak	Spacewatch	·	1.3 km	MPC · JPL
875925	2006 SG_{189}	—	September 18, 2006	Kitt Peak	Spacewatch	·	1.0 km	MPC · JPL
875926	2006 SQ_{194}	—	September 19, 2006	Kitt Peak	Spacewatch	·	2.4 km	MPC · JPL
875927	2006 SF_{195}	—	September 17, 2006	Kitt Peak	Spacewatch	·	820 m	MPC · JPL
875928	2006 SL_{200}	—	September 18, 2006	Kitt Peak	Spacewatch	MAS	450 m	MPC · JPL
875929	2006 SQ_{215}	—	September 14, 2006	Kitt Peak	Spacewatch	THM	1.8 km	MPC · JPL
875930	2006 SS_{219}	—	September 23, 2006	Kitt Peak	Spacewatch	·	740 m	MPC · JPL
875931	2006 SA_{223}	—	September 25, 2006	Mount Lemmon	Mount Lemmon Survey	·	700 m	MPC · JPL
875932	2006 SA_{230}	—	September 26, 2006	Kitt Peak	Spacewatch	·	1.3 km	MPC · JPL
875933	2006 SZ_{234}	—	September 18, 2006	Kitt Peak	Spacewatch	·	1.2 km	MPC · JPL
875934	2006 SP_{252}	—	September 19, 2006	Kitt Peak	Spacewatch	NYS · critical	570 m	MPC · JPL
875935	2006 ST_{270}	—	September 27, 2006	Kitt Peak	Spacewatch	·	1.9 km	MPC · JPL
875936	2006 SP_{278}	—	September 28, 2006	Mount Lemmon	Mount Lemmon Survey	DOR	1.8 km	MPC · JPL
875937	2006 SQ_{308}	—	September 27, 2006	Kitt Peak	Spacewatch	·	1.2 km	MPC · JPL
875938	2006 SK_{321}	—	September 27, 2006	Kitt Peak	Spacewatch	THB	2.0 km	MPC · JPL
875939	2006 SL_{322}	—	September 17, 2006	Kitt Peak	Spacewatch	·	1.5 km	MPC · JPL
875940	2006 SR_{340}	—	September 28, 2006	Kitt Peak	Spacewatch	·	830 m	MPC · JPL
875941	2006 SB_{353}	—	September 30, 2006	Catalina	CSS	·	960 m	MPC · JPL
875942	2006 SS_{357}	—	September 30, 2006	Mount Lemmon	Mount Lemmon Survey	PHO	650 m	MPC · JPL
875943	2006 SN_{376}	—	September 17, 2006	Apache Point	SDSS Collaboration	LIX	1.9 km	MPC · JPL
875944	2006 SU_{377}	—	September 17, 2006	Apache Point	SDSS Collaboration	·	1.1 km	MPC · JPL
875945	2006 SM_{395}	—	September 17, 2006	Mauna Kea	Masiero, J., R. Jedicke	·	700 m	MPC · JPL
875946	2006 SV_{403}	—	September 28, 2006	Kitt Peak	Spacewatch	·	1.2 km	MPC · JPL
875947	2006 SU_{411}	—	September 28, 2006	Catalina	CSS	·	2.0 km	MPC · JPL
875948	2006 ST_{423}	—	September 27, 2006	Mount Lemmon	Mount Lemmon Survey	PHO	740 m	MPC · JPL
875949	2006 SG_{429}	—	September 19, 2006	Kitt Peak	Spacewatch	·	690 m	MPC · JPL
875950	2006 SX_{431}	—	September 16, 2006	Kitt Peak	Spacewatch	NYS	780 m	MPC · JPL
875951	2006 SQ_{434}	—	September 17, 2006	Kitt Peak	Spacewatch	·	760 m	MPC · JPL
875952	2006 SL_{438}	—	November 8, 2015	Mount Lemmon	Mount Lemmon Survey	·	1.1 km	MPC · JPL
875953	2006 SK_{443}	—	September 19, 2006	Kitt Peak	Spacewatch	·	780 m	MPC · JPL
875954	2006 SR_{449}	—	September 19, 2006	Kitt Peak	Spacewatch	·	1.2 km	MPC · JPL
875955	2006 SO_{450}	—	September 17, 2006	Kitt Peak	Spacewatch	TIN	580 m	MPC · JPL
875956	2006 SE_{451}	—	September 19, 2006	Kitt Peak	Spacewatch	·	1.4 km	MPC · JPL
875957	2006 SN_{455}	—	September 17, 2006	Anderson Mesa	LONEOS	·	910 m	MPC · JPL
875958	2006 SC_{460}	—	September 30, 2006	Mount Lemmon	Mount Lemmon Survey	·	890 m	MPC · JPL
875959	2006 TR_{2}	—	October 2, 2006	Mount Lemmon	Mount Lemmon Survey	AGN	790 m	MPC · JPL
875960	2006 TN_{14}	—	October 10, 2006	Palomar	NEAT	·	590 m	MPC · JPL
875961	2006 TU_{14}	—	October 2, 2006	Kitt Peak	Spacewatch	·	1.1 km	MPC · JPL
875962	2006 TV_{22}	—	September 30, 2006	Mount Lemmon	Mount Lemmon Survey	·	2.1 km	MPC · JPL
875963	2006 TG_{41}	—	October 12, 2006	Kitt Peak	Spacewatch	·	820 m	MPC · JPL
875964	2006 TZ_{41}	—	October 12, 2006	Kitt Peak	Spacewatch	·	770 m	MPC · JPL
875965	2006 TY_{60}	—	September 30, 2006	Mount Lemmon	Mount Lemmon Survey	·	1.1 km	MPC · JPL
875966	2006 TQ_{100}	—	October 15, 2006	Kitt Peak	Spacewatch	·	2.1 km	MPC · JPL
875967	2006 TK_{114}	—	October 1, 2006	Apache Point	SDSS Collaboration	EOS	1.1 km	MPC · JPL
875968	2006 TJ_{122}	—	October 2, 2006	Mount Lemmon	Mount Lemmon Survey	(5)	760 m	MPC · JPL
875969	2006 TD_{124}	—	October 2, 2006	Mount Lemmon	Mount Lemmon Survey	·	2.0 km	MPC · JPL
875970	2006 TZ_{127}	—	October 13, 2006	Kitt Peak	Spacewatch	·	1.3 km	MPC · JPL
875971	2006 TQ_{131}	—	October 2, 2006	Mount Lemmon	Mount Lemmon Survey	NYS	770 m	MPC · JPL
875972	2006 TE_{133}	—	October 3, 2006	Mount Lemmon	Mount Lemmon Survey	GEF	840 m	MPC · JPL
875973	2006 TM_{133}	—	October 4, 2006	Mount Lemmon	Mount Lemmon Survey	H	370 m	MPC · JPL
875974	2006 TC_{138}	—	October 13, 2006	Kitt Peak	Spacewatch	·	660 m	MPC · JPL
875975	2006 UU_{24}	—	October 16, 2006	Kitt Peak	Spacewatch	AGN	820 m	MPC · JPL
875976	2006 UF_{26}	—	September 25, 2006	Mount Lemmon	Mount Lemmon Survey	·	940 m	MPC · JPL
875977	2006 UT_{29}	—	October 16, 2006	Kitt Peak	Spacewatch	·	1.2 km	MPC · JPL
875978	2006 UH_{34}	—	September 30, 2006	Mount Lemmon	Mount Lemmon Survey	DOR	1.7 km	MPC · JPL
875979	2006 UT_{54}	—	October 17, 2006	Catalina	CSS	·	470 m	MPC · JPL
875980	2006 UJ_{58}	—	September 17, 2006	Catalina	CSS	·	1.5 km	MPC · JPL
875981	2006 UD_{66}	—	September 17, 2006	Kitt Peak	Spacewatch	GEF	720 m	MPC · JPL
875982	2006 UH_{76}	—	October 17, 2006	Mount Lemmon	Mount Lemmon Survey	·	840 m	MPC · JPL
875983	2006 UL_{84}	—	September 25, 2006	Mount Lemmon	Mount Lemmon Survey	MAS	490 m	MPC · JPL
875984	2006 UE_{97}	—	October 18, 2006	Kitt Peak	Spacewatch	H	260 m	MPC · JPL
875985	2006 UX_{99}	—	October 18, 2006	Kitt Peak	Spacewatch	·	900 m	MPC · JPL
875986	2006 UY_{113}	—	October 19, 2006	Kitt Peak	Spacewatch	GEF	780 m	MPC · JPL
875987	2006 UO_{118}	—	September 24, 2006	Kitt Peak	Spacewatch	·	690 m	MPC · JPL
875988	2006 UD_{142}	—	October 19, 2006	Kitt Peak	Spacewatch	·	650 m	MPC · JPL
875989	2006 UY_{190}	—	September 28, 2006	Catalina	CSS	JUN	670 m	MPC · JPL
875990	2006 UC_{196}	—	October 20, 2006	Kitt Peak	Spacewatch	VER	1.9 km	MPC · JPL
875991	2006 UN_{196}	—	October 20, 2006	Kitt Peak	Spacewatch	MAS	450 m	MPC · JPL
875992	2006 UK_{217}	—	October 31, 2006	Socorro	LINEAR	APO	570 m	MPC · JPL
875993	2006 UA_{219}	—	September 25, 2006	Anderson Mesa	LONEOS	THB	2.2 km	MPC · JPL
875994	2006 US_{222}	—	September 19, 2006	Anderson Mesa	LONEOS	·	1.4 km	MPC · JPL
875995	2006 UN_{233}	—	October 22, 2006	Kitt Peak	Spacewatch	·	1.4 km	MPC · JPL
875996	2006 UV_{271}	—	October 13, 2006	Kitt Peak	Spacewatch	·	1.8 km	MPC · JPL
875997	2006 UQ_{280}	—	October 28, 2006	Mount Lemmon	Mount Lemmon Survey	·	1.2 km	MPC · JPL
875998	2006 UQ_{284}	—	October 20, 2006	Kitt Peak	Spacewatch	·	700 m	MPC · JPL
875999	2006 UL_{301}	—	October 2, 2006	Mount Lemmon	Mount Lemmon Survey	·	1.7 km	MPC · JPL
876000	2006 UN_{344}	—	November 11, 2006	Mount Lemmon	Mount Lemmon Survey	·	1.3 km	MPC · JPL

back to top

== Meaning of names ==
As minor planet discoveries are confirmed, they are given a permanent number by the IAU's Minor Planet Center (MPC), and the discoverers can then submit names for them, following the IAU's naming conventions. The list below concerns those minor planets in the specified number-range that have received names, and explains the meanings of those names.

Official naming citations of newly named small Solar System bodies are approved and published in a bulletin by IAU's Working Group for Small Bodies Nomenclature (WGSBN). Before May 2021, citations were published in MPC's Minor Planet Circulars for many decades. Recent citations can also be found on the JPL Small-Body Database (SBDB). Until his death in 2016, German astronomer Lutz D. Schmadel compiled these citations into the Dictionary of Minor Planet Names (DMP) and regularly updated the collection.

Based on Paul Herget's The Names of the Minor Planets, Schmadel also researched the unclear origin of numerous asteroids, most of which had been named prior to World War II. This article incorporates text from this source, which is in the public domain: SBDB New namings may only be added to this list below after official publication as the preannouncement of names is condemned. The WGSBN publishes a comprehensive guideline for the naming rules of non-cometary small Solar System bodies.

Named minor planet	Provisional	This minor planet was named for...	Ref · Catalog
875129 Abbeyridgeobs	2024 SM_{9}	Abbey Ridge Observatory (ARO), an observatory located in Stillwater Lake, Nova Scotia, Canada.	IAU · 875129
875150 Burkegaffneyobs	2025 KX_{5}	The Burke-Gaffney Observatory (BGO) is an observatory located in Halifax, Nova Scotia, Canada.	IAU · 875150
