= Comet Spacewatch =

Spacewatch may refer to any of the comets discovered by the Spacewatch survey of the Kitt Peak Observatory below:

== Periodic comets ==
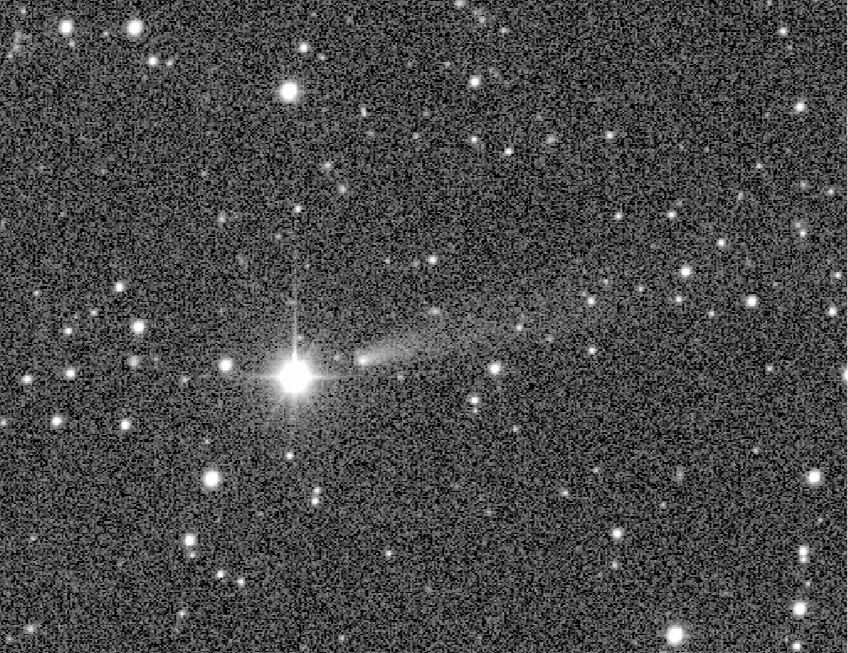
125P/Spacewatch

- 125P/Spacewatch
- 283P/Spacewatch
- 293P/Spacewatch
- 361P/Spacewatch
- 366P/Spacewatch
- 379P/Spacewatch
- P/2010 UH_{55} (Spacewatch)
- P/2013 YG_{46} (Spacewatch)

== Non-periodic comets ==
- C/1992 J1 (Spacewatch)
- C/1997 BA_{6} (Spacewatch)
- C/1997 P2 (Spacewatch)
- C/2000 OF_{8} (Spacewatch)
- C/2003 K1 (Spacewatch)
- C/2004 HV_{60} (Spacewatch)
- C/2006 GZ_{2} (Spacewatch)
- C/2006 M2 (Spacewatch)
- C/2006 U6 (Spacewatch)
- C/2007 D2 (Spacewatch)
- C/2007 VO_{53} (Spacewatch)
- C/2011 KP_{36} (Spacewatch)
- C/2013 TW_{5} (Spacewatch)

== Others ==
288P/2006 VW_{139}

Comet Spacewatch may also refer to a partial reference to comets co-discovered with the Spacewatch Telescope:

- Comet LINEAR–Spacewatch
  - 381P/LINEAR–Spacewatch
- Comet Spacewatch–Hill
  - 393P/Spacewatch–Hill
- Comet Spacewatch–LINEAR
  - 475P/Spacewatch–LINEAR
- Comet Spacewatch–PanSTARRS
  - 491P/Spacewatch–PanSTARRS
  - 497P/Spacewatch–PanSTARRS

Additionally, two near-Earth asteroids discovered by Spacewatch were discovered to have cometary activity in 2016 and 2025, respectively:

- (300163) 2006 VW139 – also known by its numerical designation 288P
- (875163) 1998 SH2
