= (875163) 1998 SH2 =

Active asteroid or comet

(875163) 1998 SH_{2}
Discovery
- Discovered by: Spacewatch
- Discovery site: Kitt Peak Observatory
- Discovery date: 17 September 1998

Designations
- Alternative designations: 1998 SH_{2} · 2016 EC_{156}
- Minor planet category: NEO · Apollo · PHA

Orbital characteristics
- Epoch 9 June 2026 (JD 2461200.5)
- Uncertainty parameter 0
- Observation arc: 27.10 years
- Aphelion: 4.701 AU
- Perihelion: 0.785 AU
- Semi-major axis: 2.743 AU
- Eccentricity: 0.71379
- Orbital period (sidereal): 4.543 years
- Mean anomaly: 70.005°
- Mean motion: 0° 13^{m} 1.115^{s} / day
- Inclination: 2.426°
- Longitude of ascending node: 6.074°
- Argument of perihelion: 268.72°
- Earth MOID: 0.019 AU
- Jupiter MOID: 0.499 AU

Physical characteristics
- Mean diameter: 0.383 ± 0.057 km (0.238 ± 0.035 mi)
- Geometric albedo: 0.058±0.024
- Absolute magnitude (H): 20.88

(875163) 1998 SH_{2} is an Apollo-type near-Earth asteroid with an estimated diameter of about 383 m (1,257 ft). It was discovered by the Spacewatch survey of the Kitt Peak National Observatory from Arizona, USA on 17 September 1998.

== Physical characteristics ==
Infrared observations from the NEOWISE spacecraft revealed that asteroid 1998 SH_{2} may have a diameter of about 383 m (1,257 ft) assuming a geometric albedo of about 0.058. Astrometric measurements up to 2025 revealed orbital perturbations consistent with weak outgassing, indicating that this object might be also a comet.

== Orbit ==
As of June 2026, 1998 SH_{2} currently has a perihelion of about 0.785 AU (117.4 million km) and aphelion of about 4.701 AU (703.3 million km) from the Sun, completing one revolution once every 4.54 years.

It made a close encounter with Earth at a distance of 0.0208 AU (3.11 million km) on 30 August 2025. By 2037, it will approach Jupiter at a distance of 0.98 AU (147 million km), followed by another Earth flyby at 0.0695 AU (10.40 million km) away on 8 September 2052. It is considered a potentially hazardous asteroid, however there is no significant impact risk with Earth in the foreseeable future.

== See also ==
- Comet Spacewatch
